= Vacuum (disambiguation) =

Vacuum is the absence of matter, or the very high, but imperfect, vacuum of the Solar System and interstellar space.

Vacuum may also refer to:

- Vacuum cleaner, a home appliance which uses suction to remove dirt
- Vacuum flask, an insulated storage vessel
- Vacuum packing, with a minimum of air
- Ultra-high vacuum
- Vacuum state, the quantum state with the lowest possible energy
- VACUUM, a data set clean-up process
- An SQL command for reclaiming and defragmentizing unused table space offered by SQLite and PostgreSQL

== As a proper noun ==
- Vacuum (journal), academic journal on vacuum science and technology
- Vacuum Oil Company, an 1866 US petroleum company, now part of ExxonMobil
- Vacuum (band), a musical group from Sweden
- The Vacuum, a free monthly newspaper published in Belfast, Northern Ireland
- Vacuum, a 2006 play by Deborah McAndrew
- Vacuum, a 2004 album by The Watch

== See also ==
- Void (disambiguation)
