= The Shame Game =

The Shame Game may refer to:

- "The Shame Game", an episode in the TV show Major Crimes
- The Shame Game, a 2020 book by journalist Mary O'Hara
- "The Shame Game" (song), a song by Daron Malankian and Scars on Broadway
