= Cathedral Quarter, Belfast =

Area of Belfast, Northern Ireland

Coordinates: 54.602°N 5.929°W

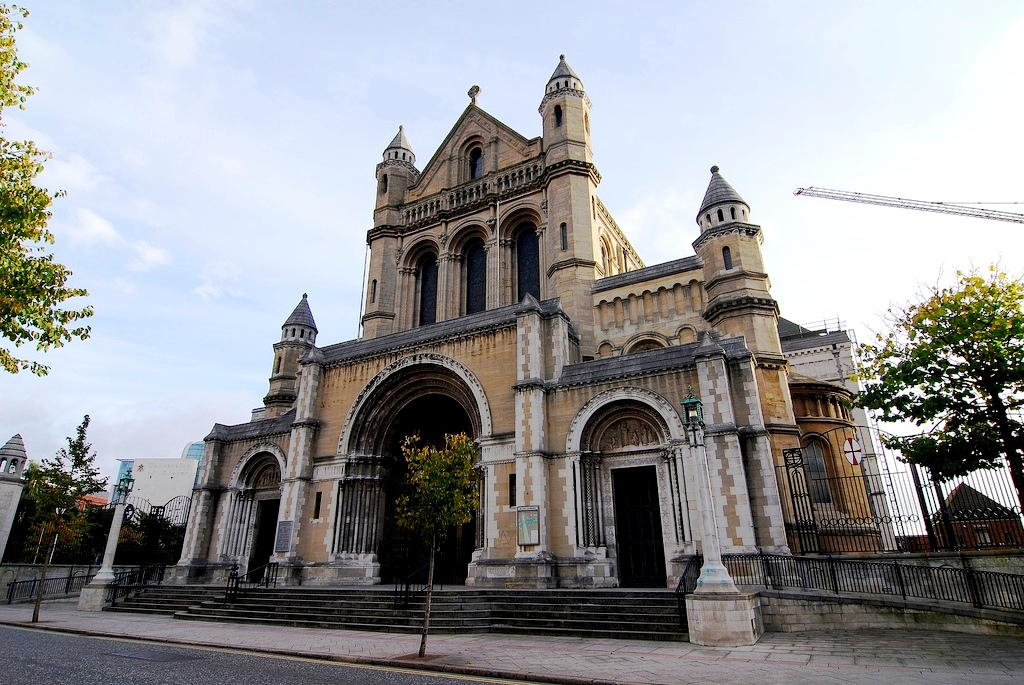
St Anne's Cathedral

The Cathedral Quarter in Belfast, Northern Ireland, is a developing area of the city, roughly situated between Royal Avenue near where the Belfast Central Library building is, and the Dunbar Link in the city centre. From one of its corners, the junction of Royal Avenue, Donegall Street and York Street, the Cathedral Quarter lies south and east. Part of the area, centred on Talbot Street behind the cathedral, was formerly called the Half Bap. The "Little Italy" area was on the opposite side of Great Patrick Street centred on Little Patrick Street and Nelson Street.

The Cathedral Quarter extends out to the edge of what can be referred as the old merchant quarter of the city. Past where the merchant area meets the Cathedral Quarter is still mostly merchant trade and services orientated and undeveloped for visitor services.

The Cathedral Quarter is so called because St Anne's Cathedral, a Church of Ireland cathedral, lies at its heart.

== History ==
Traditionally, the Cathedral Quarter was the centre of Belfast's trade and warehousing district, which sprung up directly from the prosperous linen and shipbuilding industries. The quarter still retains some of Belfast's oldest buildings and thoroughfares, including Waring Street and Hill Street.

The area fell into decline in the last century, but more recently it has re-emerged as a dedicated 'cultural quarter' of Belfast. Areas such as North Street are still in a state of dilapidation, but are likely to be redeveloped along with the rest of the quarter.

== Cultural quarter ==
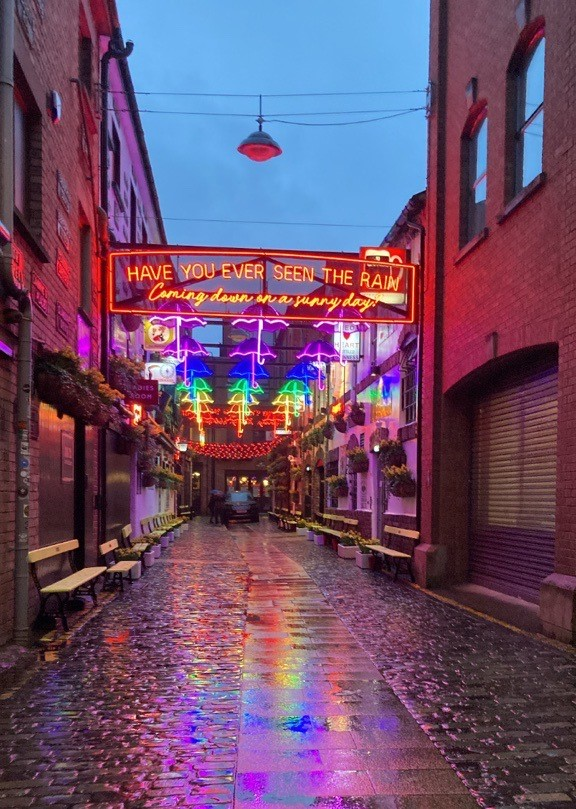
Commercial Court

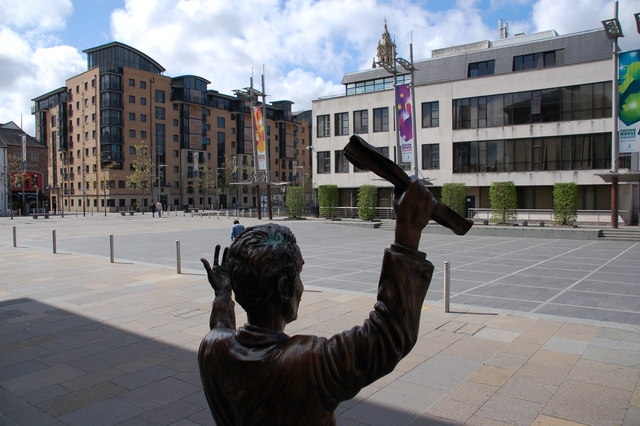
Custom House Square

The definition of the area as a cultural quarter mostly came about because of the recent significant growth in arts- and culture-based organisations that are located there. As is the case with London's Covent Garden and Dublin's Temple Bar in the years before they became as renowned as they are, low rent and a central city location attracted to the area a wide variety of tenants. Some examples include Northern Visions TV (a.k.a. Belfast Community Television), The Safehouse Arts Gallery (and its parent organisation Community Visual Images), Belfast Print Workshop and Belfast's small Zen Meditation community, which has its headquarters at Black Mountain Zen Centre (a.k.a. Belfast Meditation Centre) in rooms in Cathedral Buildings, opposite St. Anne's. Dilapidated infrastructure, however, prevented any sort of mass repopulation of the area until recently. Development and repopulation may further have been hindered from a time since the North Street Arcade, a listed building from the 1930s in the traditional Art Deco style, burned down in what many people believe were suspicious circumstances in 2004.

A rich literary heritage is evident in the area. The Northern Whig was a popular satirical newspaper in the 19th century (very much in the same vein as Punch), with its headquarters on the corner of Waring Street and Bridge Street, opposite the Assembly Rooms. Today, The Northern Whig building is a pub and restaurant, but the tradition of satirical writing still has a home in Cathedral Quarter through The Vacuum, which has its offices in the area. Cathedral Quarter is very close to both the Belfast Central Library building and the headquarters of local newspaper publication the Belfast Telegraph. The Sunday World has its Belfast offices in Commercial Court in the Cathedral Quarter. Another newspaper, the Belfast News Letter, formerly had its headquarters on Donegall Street. The Irish News, another well-known newspaper, still has its head office on Donegall Street.

Inspired by this literary flavour, a pub in the area is named after Belfast poet John Hewitt. The John Hewitt houses noteworthy and interesting artwork and photographs in changing exhibitions, often with the art being for sale. It also includes a small political display installation, and some cuttings about Hewitt.

Belfast's Custom House, situated on the very edge of Cathedral Quarter by the city's central Laganside bank, was a popular site for public speakers during the late 19th and early 20th centuries. In those times, in the vein of London's Speakers' Corner, the city's citizens often participated in the art of lively and spontaneous debate on any given subject. Today, in the site's reincarnation as Custom House Square, activities can be widely varied, from more pedestrian and family-orientated performances and activities to large-scale music concerts, D.J. performances and circus-style performance events for both adults and children. In autumn 2008, a showcase style afternoon with a succession of performers of roots, modern folk and country music from all over the world was hosted in tents. This is a characteristic type of occasion in Custom House Square which happens quite a number of times each year. This occasion was the closing day of the internationally highly acclaimed annual Open House Festival of the city. The festival takes place in many venues, including others within Cathedral Quarter, and its presence within marquees in Custom House Square in 2008 included an international festival of chilli peppers and chilli dishes.

The annual Cathedral Quarter Arts Festival in late Spring is one of the larger of the city's many cultural festivals. This festival has become internationally recognised and attracts a good number of international performers. Though the CQAF is a notably smaller affair than the Belfast Festival at Queen's which has been known at times as the second largest international European arts Festival (second in size to the Edinburgh Festival). An offshoot of this festival which is organised by the same Cathedral Quarter festival company is a smaller annual cultural festival, which however has a duration of most of the month: The Out to Lunch Arts Festival happens in The Cathedral Quarter in January.

Also central to the area is the Belfast campus of the Ulster University. Nearby North Street is home to many of Belfast's most notorious bars and venues, particularly renowned during the punk movement of the 1970s. These include The Front Page and Giro's (closed 2004). Derry rockers The Undertones were regular visitors to the University of Ulster's student union building, the Conor Hall, as well as The Assembly Rooms (a building which currently houses a Central Belfast gallery of The Emer Gallery, and has been known as The Northern Bank theatre). Local punk producer Terri Hooley ran a record store called Cathedral Records in the North Street Arcade before 2004's fire.

Other arts organisations active in the area include:

- Northern Visions/ N.V.TV. (A local T.V. station and arts and media project)
- Belfast Exposed
- Factotum publisher of The Vacuum newspaper (satirical publication)
- The Black Box
- The Oh Yeah Music Centre
- Belfast Community Circus School
- Cathedral Quarter Arts Festival
- Belfast Film Festival
- Craft Northern Ireland

The area hosts a good number of various kinds of artists' spaces, though these are generally not open to the public. There are meetings in and around the area of various cultural and community organisations which members of the public can attend; for example the Belfast Humanist Group meet a couple of times a month at the Community Arts Forum opposite the cathedral.

The cathedral itself remains a venue for cultural events, including evening and sometimes lunchtime music concerts. Concerts can be given by the musical performers associated with the cathedral and, more often, by independent musicians. The services of the cathedral frequently include sung services by the cathedral choir, and organ playing by the cathedral organist or sometimes a visiting organist. Evensong is also sung here. The Sunday sung service is at 11 am. There is also a youth choir of the cathedral which performs, of persons in their late teens and early twenties who are thought to be of a high standard of music making. Their aim is to perform and produce marketed recordings and radio recordings. Persons of any religion or none are welcome to attend services, musical or otherwise. Concerts given by independent musicians are given in a lovely venue and are not connected with the spiritual affairs of the Church of Ireland cathedral.

The Northern Ireland War Memorial is a quite recently established commemorative museum and exhibition space in Talbot Street (along one side of the cathedral). Prince Michael of Kent was Guest of Honour at a commemorative service in re-dedication of the War Memorial on 4 November 2008.

On the corner of Donegall Street and Waring Street, a former bank building had become known as the Northern Bank Theatre, having housed irregular dramatic performances, mostly limited to festival times. This fine city building had been known in a former incarnation as the Exchange and Assembly Rooms. In 2008's Cathedral Quarter Arts Festival, a monologue production about the Burmese opposition leader Aung San Suu Kyi, The Lady of Burma, was a popular play, it also proving a good use of this building. There has been much comment about the desire for this building to have a cultural use, given its excellent location and spatial quality. A future permanent function of the building is not known publicly.

Late in 2008, the former Northern Bank building has become a city centre location for The Emer Gallery, a Belfast gallery which is based near the northern edge of Belfast in the Cavehill vicinity. A large retrospective of the work of Armagh artist J. B. Vallely was programmed here until early 2009. This exhibition also demonstrated the suitability of the building as a gallery space. The Emer Gallery is named after a female Irish mythological character.

The Muddlers Club, a Michelin-starred restaurant, is located on Warehouse Lane.

Laganside Corporation sponsored initiatives that included a 'Managed Workspace' scheme, in which artists are invited to inhabit workshop space owned and refurbished by Laganside. The first such scheme was the refurbishment in 2002 of an old cotton warehouse, named Cotton Court. Other Managed Workspaces are at 23-25 Donegall Street and 9-13 Royal Avenue. It was at this time that Cathedral Quarter was given its name. Such was the popularity of the scheme that many other quarters have subsequently emerged in Belfast, both spontaneously and by design, such as the Gaeltacht Quarter, Titanic Quarter and Queen's Quarter.

In 2003, the council began a programme of street landscaping that began with laying new paving stones in Hill Street and Talbot Street, and which culminated in the opening in 2004 of Custom House Square, a council-managed public square in front of Belfast's old Custom House building.

== The architectural competition ==
In 2006, Belfast's Old Museum Arts Centre arts company and the Northern Ireland Arts Council announced plans to develop a dedicated arts venue for the city on the site of the Talbot Street car park. N.I.A.C. and Belfast City Council provided funds for a temporary arts venue on Hill Street, named 'The Black Box', until the Talbot Street development was finished. The Metropolitan Arts Centre building opened in 2012 following an architectural design competition managed by RIBA Competitions where Hackett Hall McKnight Architects were appointed. There was some high-profile publicizing of the anticipated arts centre, including an involvement with Hollywood actress, Meryl Streep. The MAC has since been awarded the Downes Medal, by the Architectural Association of Ireland for an individual project and received an RIBA National Award. The building was nominated for the European Union Prize for Contemporary Architecture – Mies van der Rohe Award and the Design Museum Designs of the Year.

== See also ==
- Belfast Quarters
- Linen Quarter, Belfast
