= North Street Arcade =

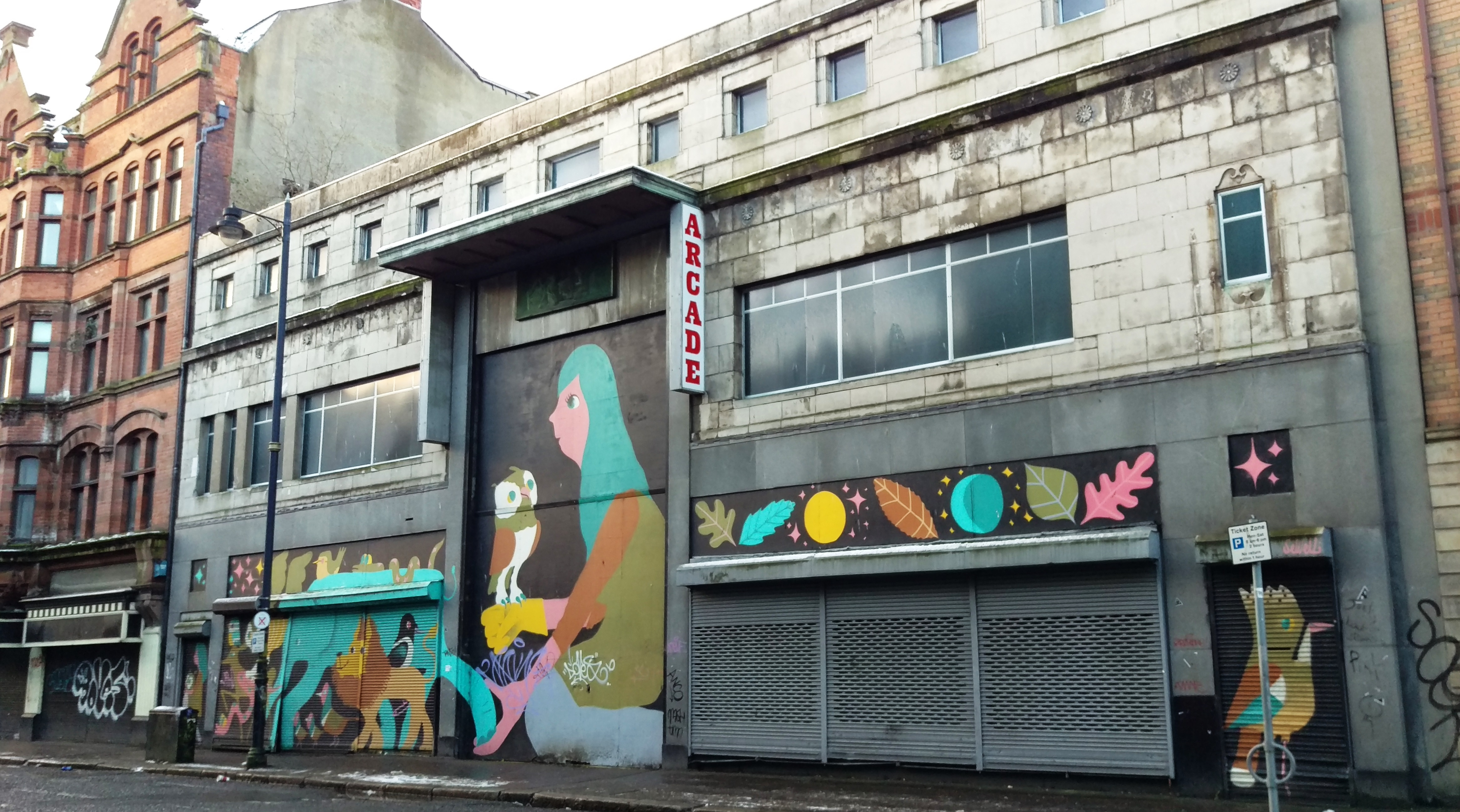
- Donegall Street façade in December 2017.

- Location within Greater Belfast

General information
- Status: Derelict
- Type: Shopping arcade
- Architectural style: Art Deco, Italianate
- Location: North Street, Cathedral Quarter, Belfast, Northern Ireland
- Coordinates: 54.60176°N 5.92938°W
- Completed: 1938

Technical details
- Floor count: 3

Design and construction
- Architecture firm: Cowser & Smyth
- Developer: F. B. McKee & Co.

Other information
- Number of units: 29

The North Street Arcade is a 1930s Art Deco shopping arcade in the Cathedral Quarter of Belfast, Northern Ireland. It is the only example of a shopping arcade from this decade in Northern Ireland, and is one of only a handful left in the whole of Ireland or the UK. A Grade B1 listed building, it has been derelict since a fire in 2004.

== History ==
The site on which the North Street Arcade was built, situated between North Street and Donegall Street, was originally occupied by a number of small premises, of which the most significant was the Brookfield Linen Company warehouse, built 1869–1881. According to architectural writer Marcus Patton (1993), in the mid-19th century, North Street mainly consisted of "small businesses, shoemakers and publicans, grocers and haberdashers, leather and iron merchants." The linen trade was also prominent in the area, particularly on Donegall Street (which was known as "Linnenhall Street" in the 18th century). The Brookfield Linen Company Ltd were flax spinners and power loom linen manufacturers and merchants who operated from their Donegall Street property from 1869. In 1936 the Brookfield Linen Company warehouse was demolished, along with the various less significant properties, to make way for the North Street Arcade. A handful of architectural details remain from the warehouse building.

Plan of North Street Arcade, linking North Street and Donegall Street.

The North Street Arcade was designed by architectural firm Cowser & Smyth. A Belfast-based architectural partnership between Benjamin Cowser (1897–1981) and Valentine Smyth (active 1930s–60s), Cowser & Smyth was formed in 1935, making this building one of the partnership's first major contracts. Construction was carried out by F. B. McKee & Co. between 1936 and 1938, in what was at the time a deprived area of the city.

The construction made use of high-end, luxurious materials, and according to Marie McHugh (1990), the arcade was not initially successful due to the high rent of shop units. After the Belfast Blitz and World War II, and the loss of retail spaces elsewhere in the city, the arcade began to fill with shop owners and the building became a commercial success. The building was first valued by the government on the Second General Revaluation of Northern Ireland (1956–1972), by the end of which, with at least 20 occupied shop units and one café, the total value of the property came to £5,321 10s.

During The Troubles, the building sustained damage from at least two bomb attacks including an IRA bomb on 13 January 1976 which also killed two civilians and the two bombers. The building subsequently fell into decay.

In May 1990 the building gained Grade B1 listed status. During the 1990s, in part due to low rent prices for shop units, a number of artists and creative organisations made their home in the arcade. By the early 2000s the building had developed into a creative hub, including a café, record shop, recording studio and the offices of the Cathedral Quarter Arts Festival, among others.

In 2004, the building was owned by William Ewart Properties, who had plans in the area for a new £120-million retail development.

=== 2004 fire ===
On 17 April 2004, the building was subject to an arson attack using incendiary devices, which destroyed all of the business units inside. 23 businesses were directly affected by the blaze. No people were injured as a result, however all the animals inside a pet shop were reportedly killed. According to BBC reports, members of the arts organisation Factotum were still present in the building up to an hour before the fire broke out.

The fire destroyed the floor and glass roof, but as of 2023 the basic structure of the units remained intact.

A number of suspects were questioned by police in relation to the incident, but no one has been prosecuted for the attack.

=== Redevelopment plans ===
Before the fire, new plans were already under development in the area, and the owners of the North Street Arcade had drawn up a proposal in 2003. These plans were reviewed by the Northern Ireland Department for Social Development (DSD) against their Regeneration Policy Statement (RPS) for Belfast city centre, published July 2003 and adopted April 2004, and found not to be meeting the required objectives of the document.

As a result, in 2005 the DSD published a masterplan for the area, developed in conjunction with Drivers Jonas and Benoy. This provided guidance for potential developers of the area, and two concept plans: one which retained only the façades of North Street Arcade (Option 1) and another which also retained the original alignment of the building (Option 2).

The subsequent development proposals for the "Royal Exchange", later renamed "North East Quarter" and then "Tribeca Belfast", produced initially by Ewart Properties and then by new owner Castlebrooke Investments, met with strong opposition from local artists and heritage organisations such as the Ulster Architectural Heritage Society as they included either partial or full demolition of the North Street Arcade, rather than the potential restoration put forward by Option 2 of the masterplan. In February 2017 the organisation "Save the Cathedral Quarter" was formed, aiming to hold the developers to account and to reach a development which paid respect to the established architectural and artistic heritage present in the area.

== Architecture ==
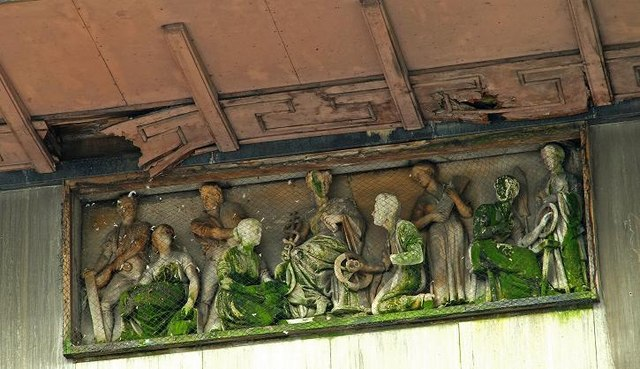
Stone sculpture over Donegall Street entrance, as retained from the Brookfield Linen Company warehouse.

The building has two entrances; one on each adjoining street. On Donegall Street, a 3-storey façade has been built in an Art Deco style from granite and reconstructed stone, while on North Street the 4-storey façade of the existing Victorian linen warehouse has been retained, in red brick and red sandstone, with the lower floors remodelled to suit the arcade. The pre-existing Brookfield Linen Company building was designed by William Henry Lynn and was described by Patton (1993) as "an imposing Italianate five-storey seven-bay building with pedimented and rusticated doorcases groined out of the heavily tooled basement plinth, swags over first floor windows, and giant order Corinthian pilasters supporting a heavy cornice and piers between attic windows."

On the North Street elevation of the North Street Arcade, Patton reported a "domed plastic porch over entrance replacing a former balcony and doorcase; but above that a dignified façade with outer bays set forward, terminating in pediments with flanking volutes". As of 2018 these upper features from the Victorian building can still be seen. The Donegall Street entrance also includes a feature of the original warehouse: a stone relief sculpture, depicting eight linen workers, which is displayed above the entrance.

Internally, the arcade is constructed on a distinctive curving alignment from Donegall Street, turning a right angle at a domed central rotunda, before proceeding straight towards North Street. Before the 2004 fire, the decor featured a tiled walkway and a glass roof, and the entrances and shop fronts were fully glazed and decorated with luxurious materials: plinths and pilasters of green marble and black granite, with windows framed by bronze trim.

== Gallery ==
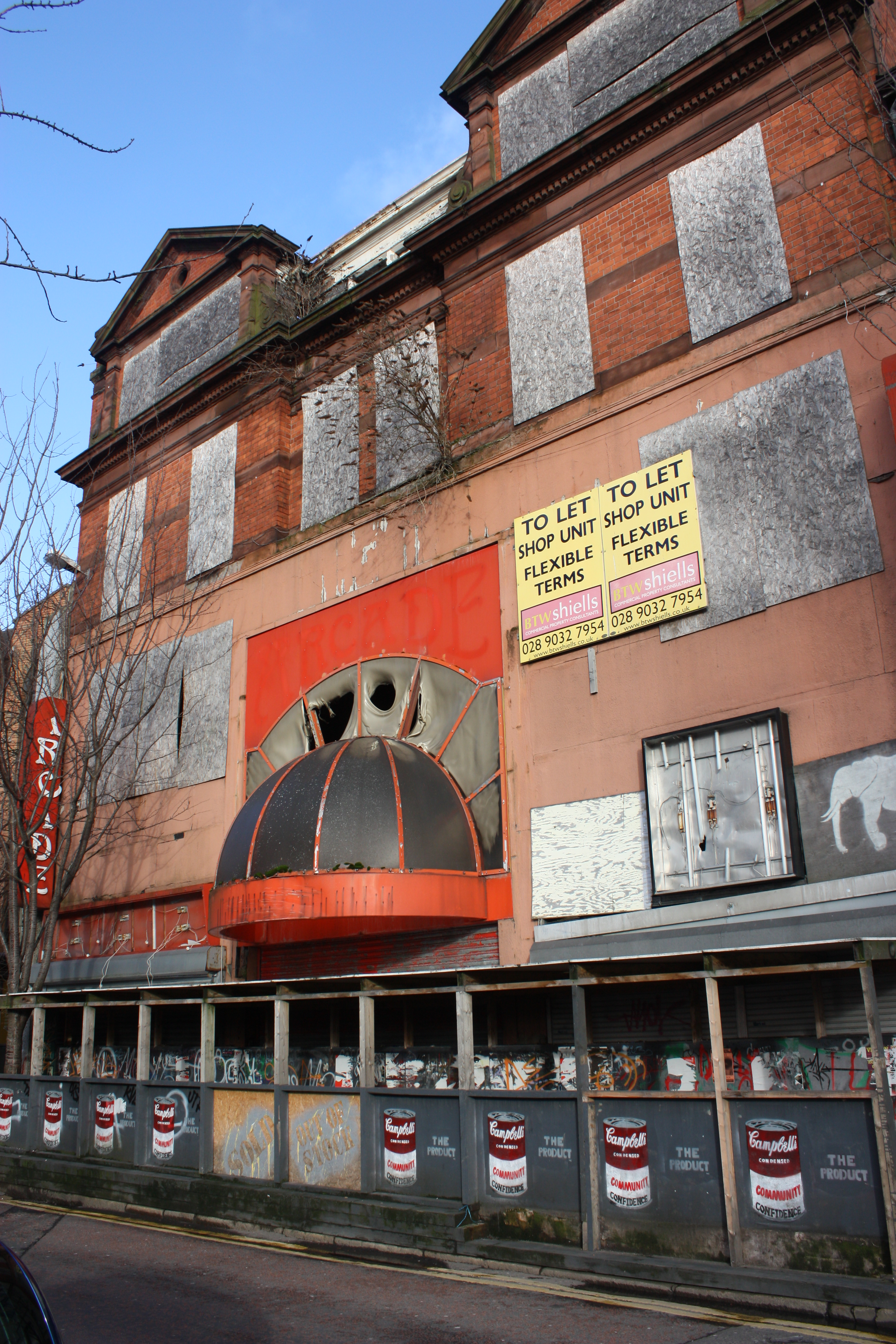
North Street façade in January 2011.

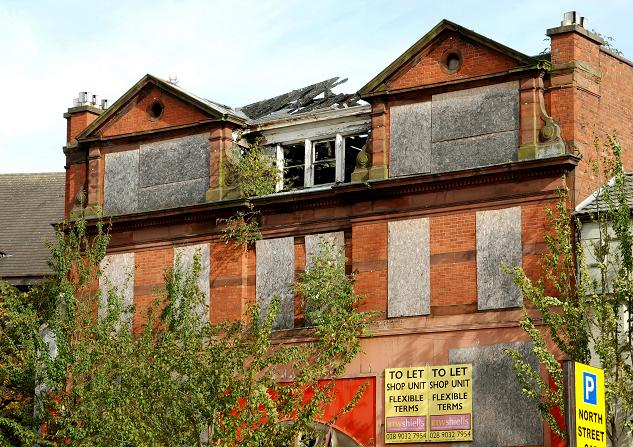
Original Victorian upper floors of the North Street entrance, September 2009.

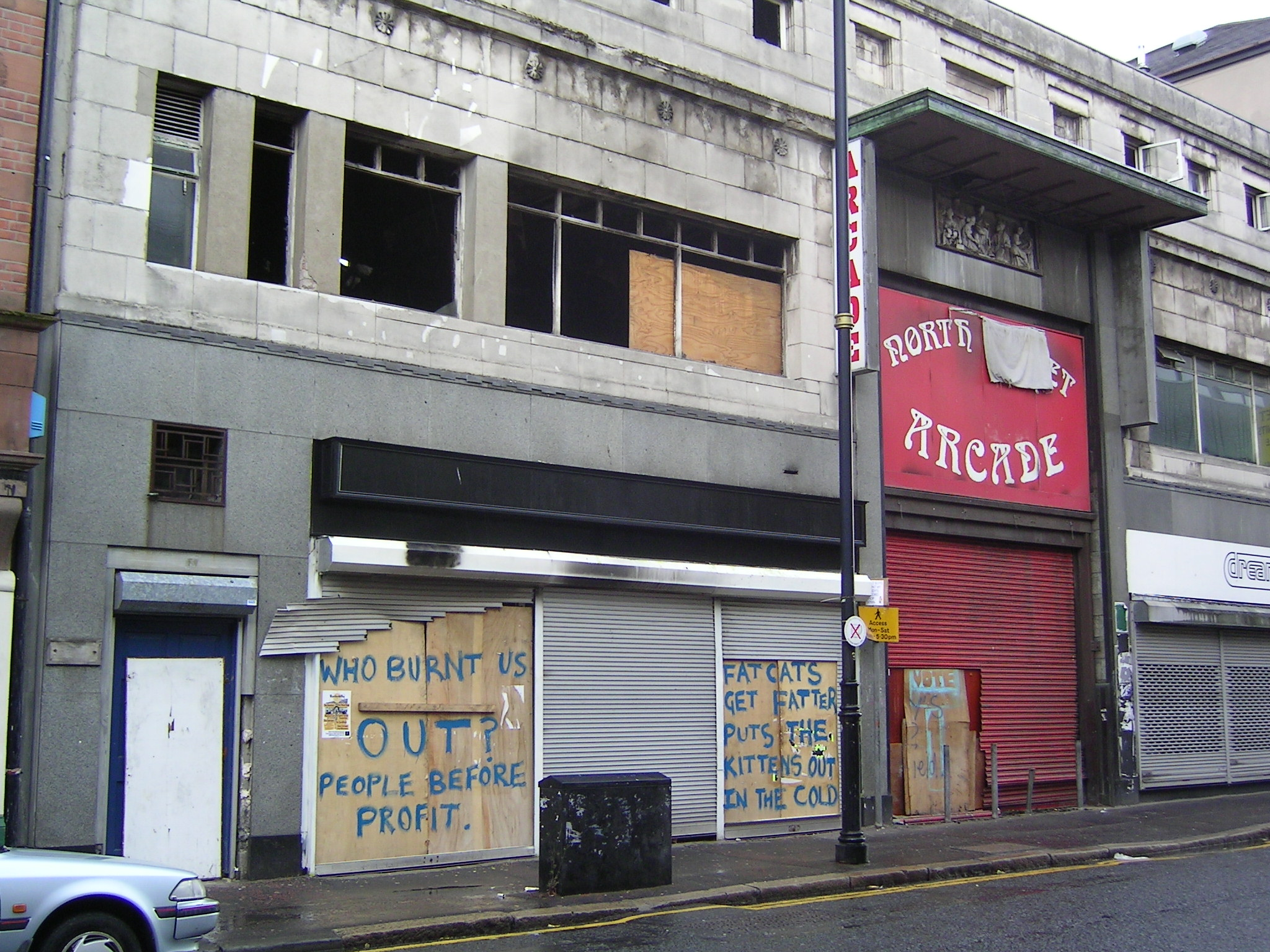
Donegall Street entrance in July 2004, with graffiti alleging that the fire was deliberate.

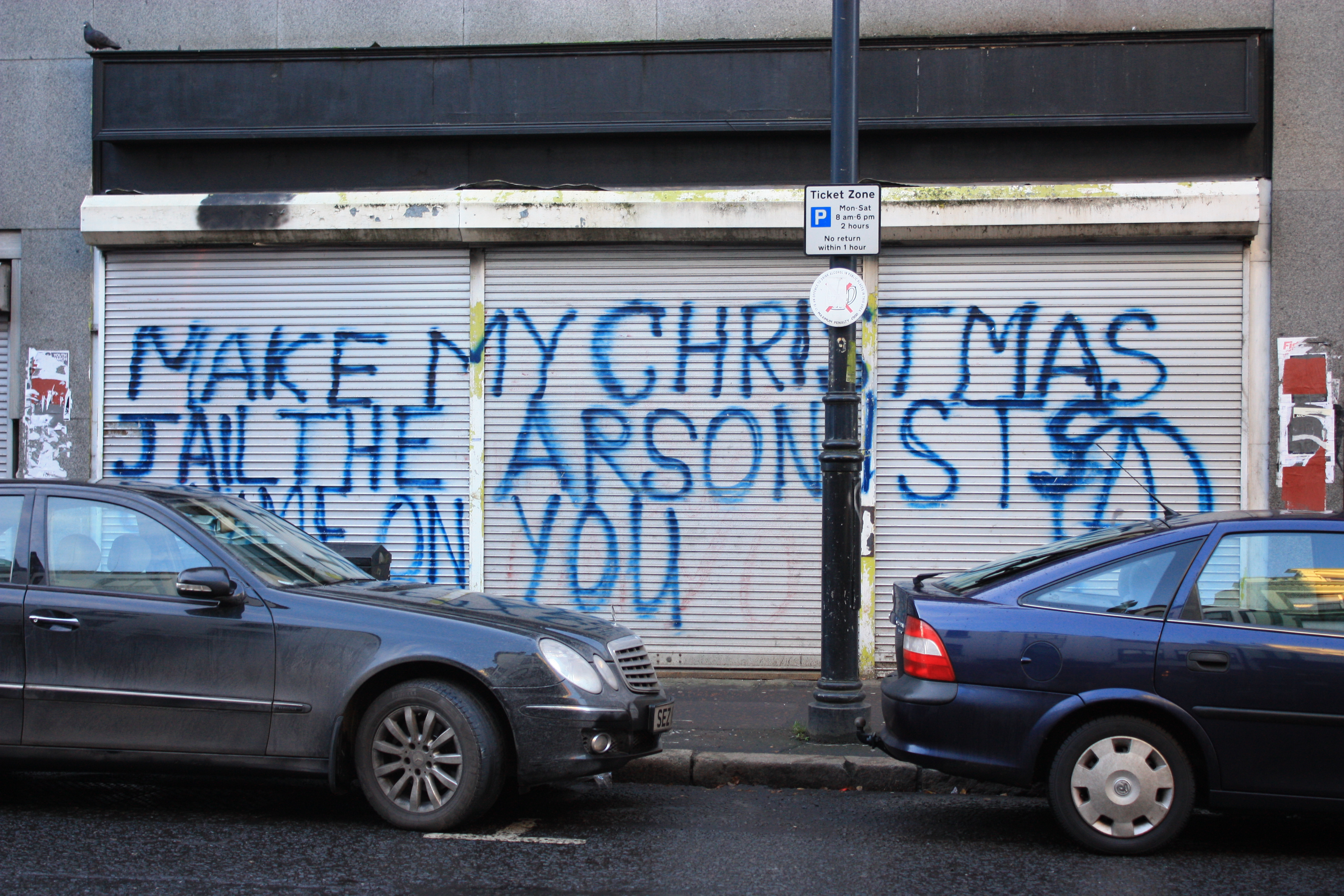
Graffiti in December 2009, appealing for the perpetrators to be jailed.

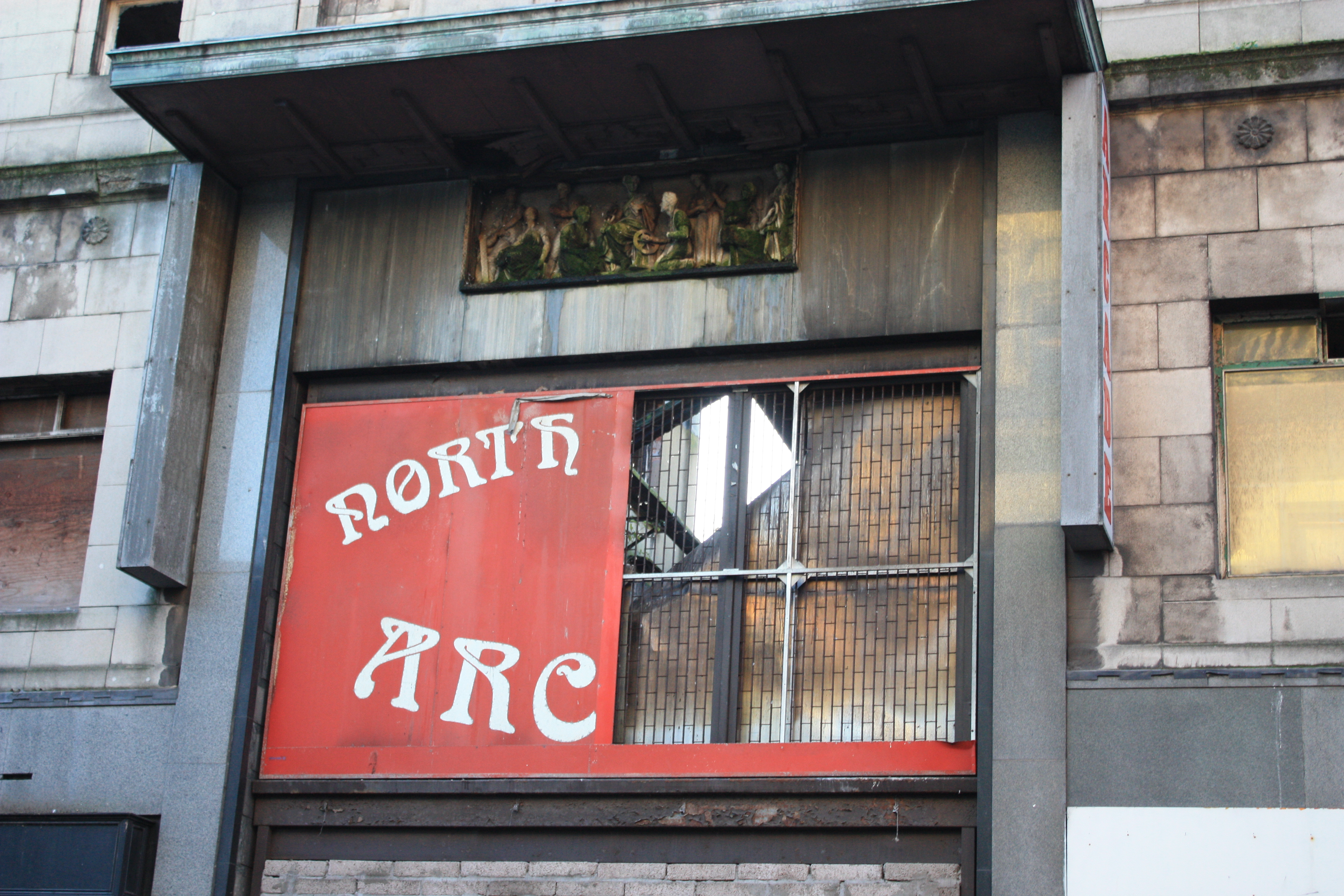
Damaged signage over Donegall Street Entrance in December 2009.

== Resources ==
=== See also ===
- Architecture of Belfast
- Queen's Arcade

=== References ===
- Holgate, Callum (2017). "North Street Arcade, 1936–1938". In Poppelreuter, Tanja (ed.). Glamour and Gloom: 1930s Architecture in Belfast. Ulster Architectural Heritage Society. pp. 136–145.

=== External links ===
- North Street Arcade, Belfast on YouTube, a video produced by Digital Key Limited (published 2 Dec 2014)
