= Pål Stenmark =

Swedish biochemist and structural biologist

- Born: 14 April 1976 (age 50)
- Scientific career
- Fields: Biochemistry; Structural biology Drug development
- Workplaces: Stockholm University; Lund University

Pål Stenmark (born 14 April 1976) is a Swedish biochemist and structural biologist. He was appointed professor of Structural Biochemistry at Lund University in 2019 and was appointed professor in neurochemistry at Stockholm University in 2021.

Stenmark's research focus on two areas:

1. The Botulinum and Tetanus Neurotoxins.
2. Enzymes in nucleotide metabolism and DNA repair.

Stenmark is among other things known for his discovery of several novel neurotoxins, including a neurotoxin that specifically kills Malaria mosquitos.

In 2025 he determined the first structure of the complete botulinum neurotoxin complex.

== Awards and honours ==
- The Lindbomska prize 2021 awarded by the Royal Swedish Academy of Sciences.
- The Sven and Ebba-Christina Hagberg prize, 2017.
- Ingvar Carlsson Award from the Swedish Foundation for Strategic Research, 2009.
- Selected for the Wenner-Gren Fellow program, 2007
