= AWB Vincent Literary Award =

The AWB Vincent Literary Award is a literary award presented annually by The Ireland Funds. It is named after Billy Vincent, the former director of the organisation, who established the award.

== Recipients ==
- 2022 – Joseph O'Connor
- 2018 – Anne Enright
- 2017 – Conor McPherson
- 2016 – Emma Donoghue
- 2015 – Fergal Keane
- 2014 – Leontia Flynn
- 2013 – Roddy Doyle
- 2012 – Seamus Heaney (Lifetime Achievement)
- 2011 – Colum McCann
- 2010 – Colm Toibin
- 2008 – David Park
- 2007 – Cathal Ó Searcaigh
- 2006 – Eugene McCabe
- 2005 – William Trevor
- 2004 – Paul Muldoon
- 2003 – Marina Carr
- 2002 – Dermot Healy
- 2001 – Tom MacIntyre
- 2000 – Edna O’Brien
- 1999 – Brendan Kennelly
- 1998 – Medbh McGuckian
- 1997 – Sebastian Barry
- 1996 – Michael Longley
- 1995 – John Montague
- 1994 – Evan Boland
- 1993 – Bryan McMahon
- 1992 – Frank McGuinness
- 1991 – Nuala Ni Dhomhnaill
- 1990 – Michael Hartnett
- 1989 – Seamus Deane
- 1988 – John B. Keane
- 1987 – Derek Mahon
- 1986 – Joint: Sean O’Faolain & Hubert Butler
- 1985 – John McGahern
- 1984 – Thomas McCarthy
- 1983 – Richard Murphy
- 1982 – Michael McLaverty
- 1981 – Brian Friel
- 1980 – Benedict Kiely
- 1979 – Mary Lavin
- 1978 – Paul Smith
- 1977 – Aidan Higgins
- 1976 – Dervla Murphy
- 1975 – John Banville
- 1974 – Thomas Kilroy
- 1973 – Seamus Heaney
- 1972 – Austin Clarke
