= Martin Lynch (writer) =

Irish playwright and theatre director

- Born: Martin Lynch; 1950 (age 75–76); Belfast, Northern Ireland
- Occupations: Playwright, theatre director
- Writing career
- Notable work: Dockers

Martin Lynch is a playwright and theatre director from Belfast.

== Life ==
Martin Lynch was born in the docks area of Belfast in 1950. He left school at 15 and became a cloth cutter, then a docker until 1973, when he became a full-time organiser for the Republican Clubs. In 1975, he organised a tour of community centres with John Arden’s Non-Stop Connolly Show. This inspired Lynch to write plays himself.

== Work ==
He co-founded the Turf Lodge Fellowship Community Theatre in 1976. Over the next five years, he wrote a series of plays including We Want Work, We Want Bread (1977), They’re Taking The Barricades Down, What About Your Ma is Your Da Still Workin’?, and A Roof Under Our Heads.

He then worked as a writer in residence with the Lyric Theatre (Belfast) (1980-82). For the Lyric he wrote: Dockers (1981), a recreation of working-class life in Belfast’s Sailortown district. This was followed by The Interrogation of Ambrose Fogarty (1982), Castles in the Air (1983), and Minstrel Boys (1985). Lynch's plays have been performed throughout Ireland and in the UK, Europe and the USA. In 1983, along with Marie Jones he wrote 'Lay Up Your Ends' for Charabanc Theatre Co., based on the Belfast Mills girls strike of 1911. From 1985–1988. he was Writer In Residence at the University Of Ulster, (Coleraine). In 1987 he wrote the screenplay for the Sam Goldwyn Hollywood movie 'A Prayer For The Dying' starring Mickey Rourke, Bob Hoskins and Liam Neeson (acting in his first feature film). In the 1990's Lynch wrote several plays for BBC Radio's 3 & 4, including 'The Clearance Of Audleystown', 'Needles and Pinsa' and 'Pictures Of Tomorrow' For the stage in this period he wrote, Northern Ireland's first large-scale Community Play, 'The Stone Chair', 'Rinty', Pictures Of Tomorrow and with Marie Jones & The Company 'The Wedding Community Play'.

From 1994 - 2000, Lynch was Director of the Northern Ireland Community Arts Forum. In 1994 Lynch drew up a paper proposing a cultural and arts quarter for the Donegall Street area of Belfast city centre north and presented it to the Department of Environment. He then brought together a representative committee and campaigned for three years to bring the quarter about. This eventually became the Cathedral Quarter, Belfast the most visited part of Belfast. In an NVTV interview, Lynch described Cathedral Quarter as perhaps his greatest achievement.

In 2002, Lynch founded the not-for-profit Green Shoot Productions to produce the work of working-class writers, writing about the working-class experience. Up to the present (2023), these have included: Chronicles Of Long Kesh,(Lynch), Fly Me To The Moon (Marie Jones), Brothers In Arms (Sam Millar), Paisley & Me (Ron Hutchinson), 1932 - The People Of Gallagher Street (Lynch & Gary Mitchell), Two Sore Legs (Brenda Murphy) and In The Name Of The Son (Lynch & Richard O'Rawe).

IN 2003, along with Conor Grimes and Alan McKee, Lynch wrote what the critically acclaimed The History Of The Troubles. This play has been performed at the Grand Opera House, Belfast nine times. It also played at the Tricycle Theatre, London and toured Ireland, clocking up audiences of over 120,000.

Since Lay Up Your Ends in 1983, Lynch's collaboration with fellow playwright, Marie Jones has continued to be very successful with collaborations such as the aforementioned The Wedding Community Play, Dancing Shoes - The George Best Story and The Miami Showband Story, both at the Grand Opera House and Irish and UK tours.

== Published plays ==
- The Interrogation of Ambrose Fogarty & Castles in the Air by Martin Lynch (Blackstaff Press)
- Lay Up Your Ends by Martin Lynch (Lagan Press)
- The History of the Troubles (accordin' to my Da) by Martin Lynch, Conor Grimes & Alan McKee (Lagan Press)
- Pictures of Tomorrow & Rinty by Martin Lynch (Lagan Press)
- Dockers & Welcome to Bladonmore Road by Martin Lynch Lagan Press)
- Chronicles of Long Kesh by Martin Lynch (Oberon Books)

== Awards ==
- 2020: Elected member of Aosdána
