= Royal Exchange =

Royal Exchange may refer to:

- North East Quarter, Belfast, a planned city centre development formerly known as Royal Exchange.
- Royal Exchange, Dublin, now City Hall, Dublin
- Royal Exchange, Edinburgh, now the Edinburgh City Chambers
- Royal Exchange, London, a centre of commerce in the City of London
- Royal Exchange, Manchester, a 19th-century classical building, home of the Royal Exchange Theatre
- Royal Exchange (New York), former market and meeting hall
- The Royal Exchange (film), 2017 Belgian-French film

== See also ==
- Royal Exchange Assurance Corporation, a London insurance company
- Royal Exchange Hotel, Brisbane, a popular pub
- Royal Exchange Square
