= Presumed Guilty (film) =

- Spanish: Presunto culpable
- Directed by: Roberto Hernández, Geoffrey Smith
- Produced by: Layda Negrete, Roberto Hernández, Martha Sosa, Yissel Ibarra
- Starring: Antonio Zúñiga; Eva Gutiérrez; Rafaél Ramirez Heredia
- Edited by: Felipe Gomez; Roberto Hernández
- Production companies: Lawyers with Camera; Instituto Mexicano de Cinematografía CONACULTA; Fondo para la producción cinematográfica (FOPROCINE)
- Distributed by: Cinépolis
- Release dates: 21 November 2008 (Amsterdam International Documentary Film Festival); 18 February 2011 (Mexico)
- Running time: 87 minutes
- Country: Mexico
- Language: Spanish

Presumed Guilty (Spanish: Presunto culpable) is a documentary following Antonio Zúñiga, who was falsely convicted of murder. It holds the box office record for documentary in Mexico, previously held by Michael Moore's Fahrenheit 911. According to The Economist, this is "by far the most successful documentary in Mexico's history." The plot of the film is the attempt by two young Mexican attorneys to exonerate a wrongly convicted man by making a documentary. The film was released theatrically at about the same time the Oscar nominated films such as Black Swan and The King's Speech were being shown on cinema screens in Mexico. It surpassed both of those films at the box office. The film was televised by Televisa on Channel 2 in the fall of 2011.

== Plot ==
Two lawyers struggle to free a man, Antonio Zúñiga, who has been wrongly convicted by the Mexican judicial system. Zúñiga was arrested on charges of murder and convicted largely on the testimony of one man. Zúñiga was told by authorities “You did it and that’s it”. Zúñiga was given the sentence of 20 years in prison for a crime that was impossible for him to have committed. Three witnesses explained that he was at his place of work during the time of which he was accused of murder. However, the man was a close relative of the victim who had no firm evidence against Zúñiga, while the accused produced several witnesses able to place him far from the scene of the crime at the time of the murder. Despite this, Zúñiga was found guilty, and when lawyers Roberto Hernández and Layda Negrete learned about his case, they agreed to help him. Hernández and Negrete cautiously advised Zúñiga, knowing that many case like his had failed before him and they were fearful of providing Zúñiga and his family with too much hope. Before leaving for graduate school in Berkeley, California, Hernández and Negrete advised the family to go public with this case - they felt it was their best shot at pressuring the Mexican judicial system to admit their error and free Zúñiga. After it was revealed that the lawyer appointed to represent Zúñiga did not have a valid license to practice law, authorities reluctantly agreed to a new trial, but with the same judge, Héctor Palomares Medina, presiding. This judge showed little interest in evidence that Zúñiga was falsely convicted. Battling an arrogant judge, uncooperative witnesses and a legal system riddled with corruption, Hernández and Negrete found that it was easy to prove Zúñiga's innocence, but hard to get the authorities to acknowledge this fact. The conviction was finally overturned in 2008 after the filmmakers persuaded appeal judges to watch their film. Presumed Guilty was a selection at the 2009 Toronto International Film Festival.

According to the film, in Mexico:

- 95% of verdicts are convictions
- 92% of those convictions are not based on physical evidence
- 78% of inmates are fed by their own families
- 93% of inmates are never shown arrest warrants
- 93% of defendants never see a judge

The story of Presumed Guilty was made into an episode of the TV series "P.O.V." that aired on 27 July 2010. It subsequently was nominated for three Emmy awards for "Best Research", "Best Documentary" and "Outstanding Investigative Journalism."

== Ban ==
In February 2011, Presumed Guilty was released to Mexican audiences and one month later, a judge moved to have the film banned. This action caused the movie to gain unprecedented popularity almost overnight. The distributor said they would continue to show the movie until the order had been formally submitted. The film also spread in the form of unlicensed DVDs. One vendor said he sold 70 copies on a single Saturday, adding that he had only sold that many of other box-office hits over a full week. The order to ban the film was revoked on March 9, 2011 by a higher court based on Article 6 of the Mexican Constitution which protects the right to free expression.

== Life for Zúñiga ==
At the end of the film, Zúñiga is shown embracing his wife and child in a joyful reunion. However, he was later said to live in fear of retribution for the film.

== Participants ==
- José Antonio Zúñiga Rodríguez, the wrongly convicted man
- Eva Gutiérrez (wife of Antonio Zúñiga)
- Rafaél Ramirez Heredia (Zuñiga's defense lawyer)
- Roberto Hernández (filmmaker/lawyer)
- Layda Negrete (filmmaker/lawyer)
- Hector Palomares Medina (the judge)
- Maricela Guzman (the prosecutor)
- Victor Daniel Reyes (witness for the prosecution)
- Jose Manuel Ortega Saavedra (Detective)

== Production ==
The film was produced chiefly by Roberto Hernández and Layda Negrete. Hernández and Negrete (LL.M. 1996, M.P.P. 1998) are candidates for PhDs in Public Policy at the Goldman School of Public Policy at the University of California, Berkeley. They are married and have two daughters.

== Accolades ==
Presumed Guilty has received numerous awards and honors, including the following:

- Emmy 2010-Outstanding Investigative Journalism
- One World Media (London, 2010) - Best Feature Documentary
- Documenta Madrid (2010) - Best Documentary Award and Audience Award
- East End Film Festival (London, 2010) - Best Feature Documentary
- Los Angeles Film Festival (2010) - Audience Award and Best International Feature
- Human Rights Watch Film Festival (New York, 2010) - Closing Night Film
- Human Rights Watch Film Festival (Toronto, 2010) - Closing Night Film
- San Francisco International Film Festival (2010) - Golden Gate Best Bay Area Documentary
- Guadalajara International Film Festival (2010) - Best Documentary
- Copenhagen International Documentary Film Festival (2009) - Amnesty International Award
- Morelia International Film Festival] (2010) - Best Documentary
- Belfast Film Festival (2009) - Maysles Brothers Documentary Award
- News & Documentary Emmy Awards (2011) - Emmy for Outstanding Investigative Journalism – Long Form

== See also ==
- Law of Mexico
- Presumption of innocence
- Law enforcement in Mexico
- Mexico City law enforcement
- Crime in Mexico -- corruption
- Federal District Police—the police of Mexico City
- Attorney General of Mexico
