= Queen's Arcade, Belfast =

- Queen's Arcade Belfast in November 2026.

- Location within Greater Belfast

General information
- Status: Completed
- Type: Shopping arcade
- Location: Royal Avenue, Belfast, Northern Ireland
- Coordinates: 54.5982°N 5.9304°W
- Completed: 1880
- Owner: John H Lunn (Jewellers) Ltd

Technical details
- Floor count: 4

Design and construction
- Architect: James McKinnon
- Developer: George Fisher

Website
- www.queensarcadebelfast.com

Queen's Arcade is a Grade B1 listed Victorian shopping arcade in the centre of Belfast, Northern Ireland. Extending between Donegall Place and Fountain Street, it is the last remaining Victorian shopping arcade in the city. The arcade is home to a mix of luxury and independent retailers and is recognised as one of Belfast's best preserved nineteenth century commercial landmarks.

== History ==
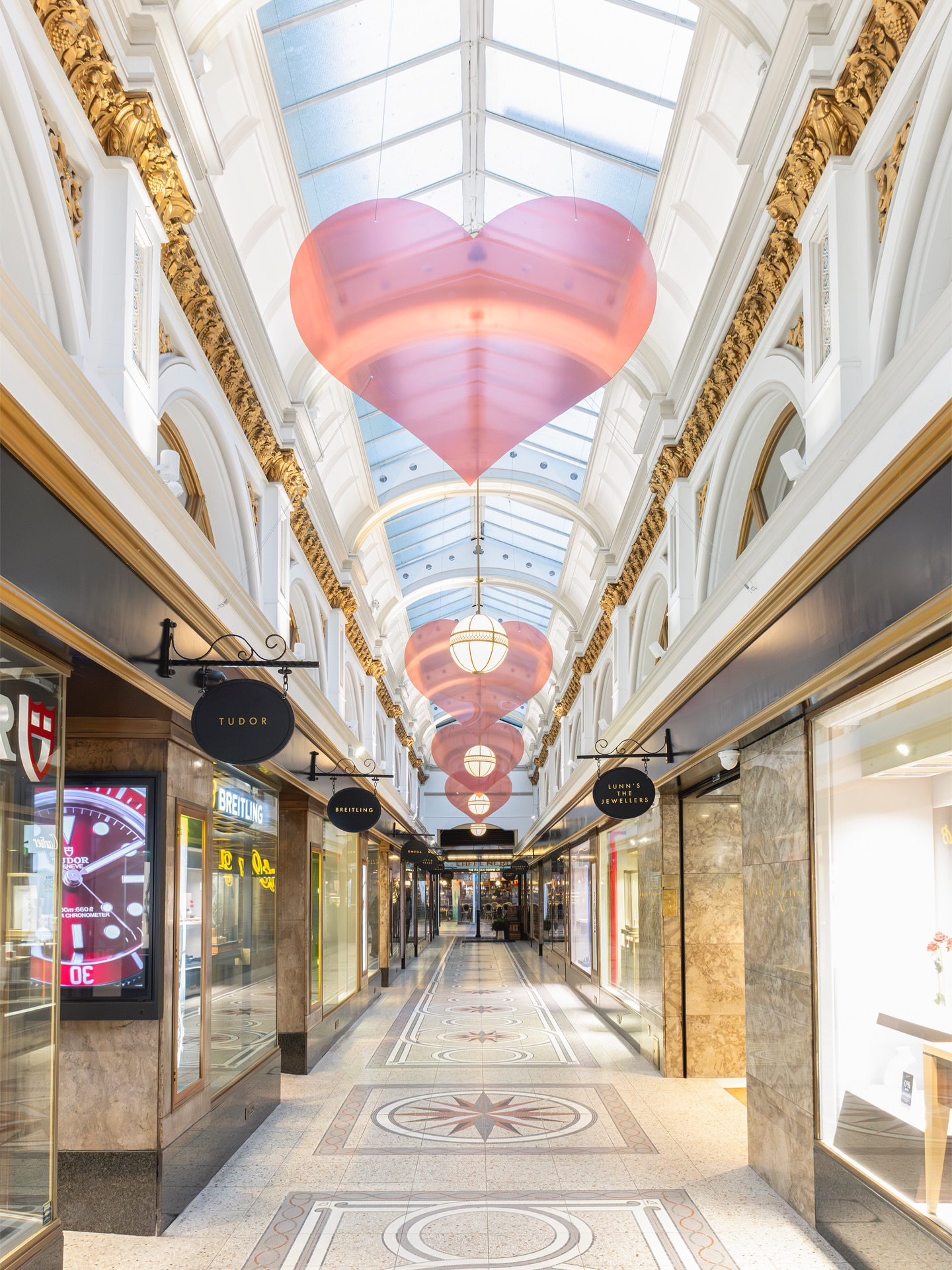
Interior view of Queen's Arcade, Belfast, showing the shopping galleries and storefronts in February 2026.

The arcade and the building above it were designed by James McKinnon in 1880, for developer George Fisher.

In 1919 it was acquired by Frederick W. Henry, who operated the adjacent Carlton Cafe & Restaurant at 25-27 Donegall Place.

In the 1930s, Hobart & Heron Architects carried out alterations for then resident Austin Reed Ltd. The monogram "AR", in reference to the company, is still visible today on the third floor of the Donegall Place façade. The same architects carried out further works in 1937, following fire damage. The architectural firm still exists today as Hobart Heron.

During the 1980s and 1990s, the arcade was owned by Prudential Portfolio Managers Ltd. In 1987 they refurbished the building façades and installed canopies over the Donegall Place and Fountain Street entrances. They carried out further refurbishment works during 1994.

The building gained Grade B1 listed status in June 1993.

In August 2002, John H. Lunn (Jewellers) Ltd, trading as Lunn's Jewellers acquired Queen's Arcade and the adjacent building at 25-27 Donegall Place. The company had been started in the arcade nearly 50 years beforehand.

In September 2024, Lunn's announced that they would be expanding into the building that formerly housed Carlton Cafe and most recently Oasis.

== Gallery ==
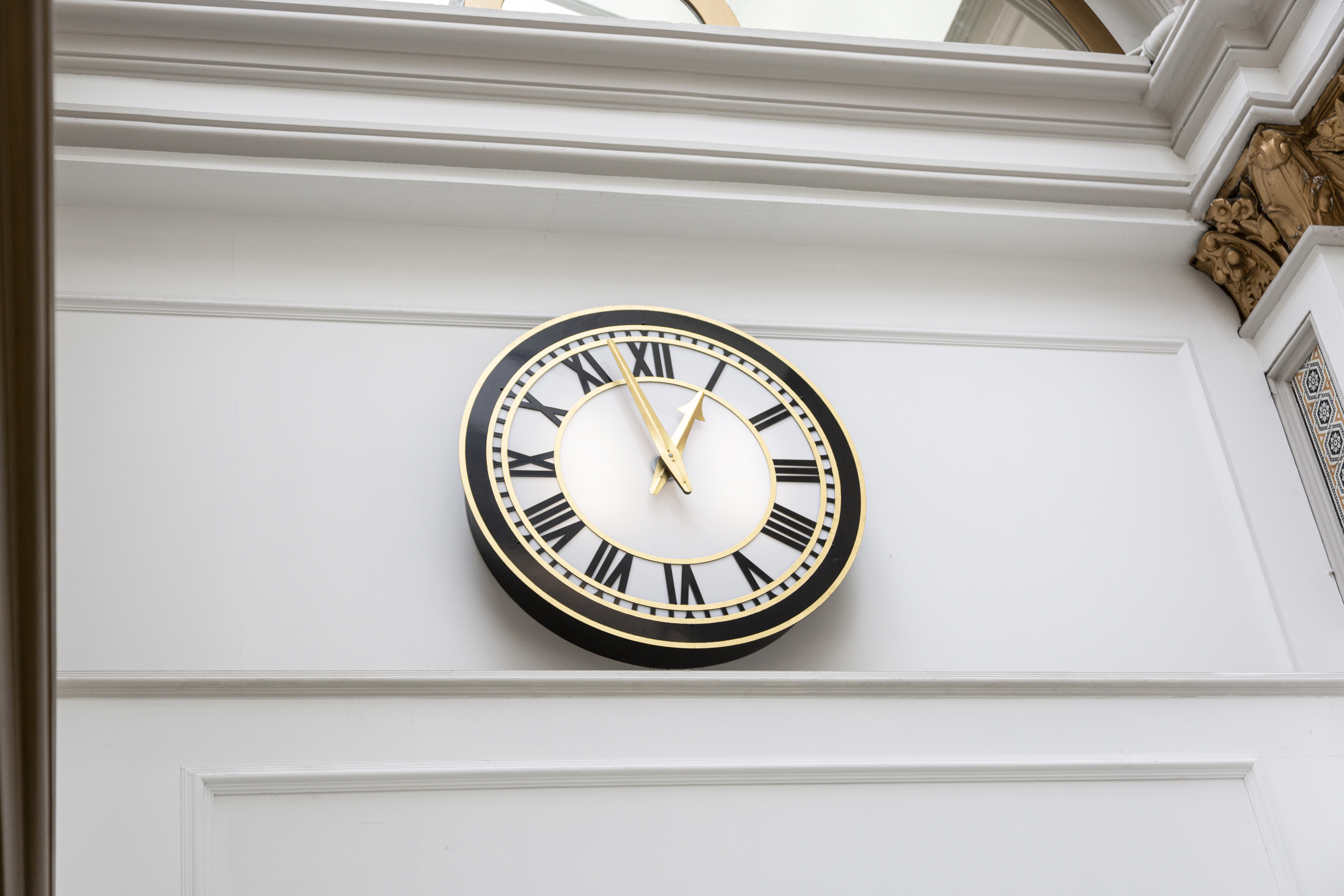
Queen's Arcade Belast Clock. Queen’s Arcade has undergone two restorations, one in the 1935 carried out by Hobart & Heron Architects, and another in 2019.

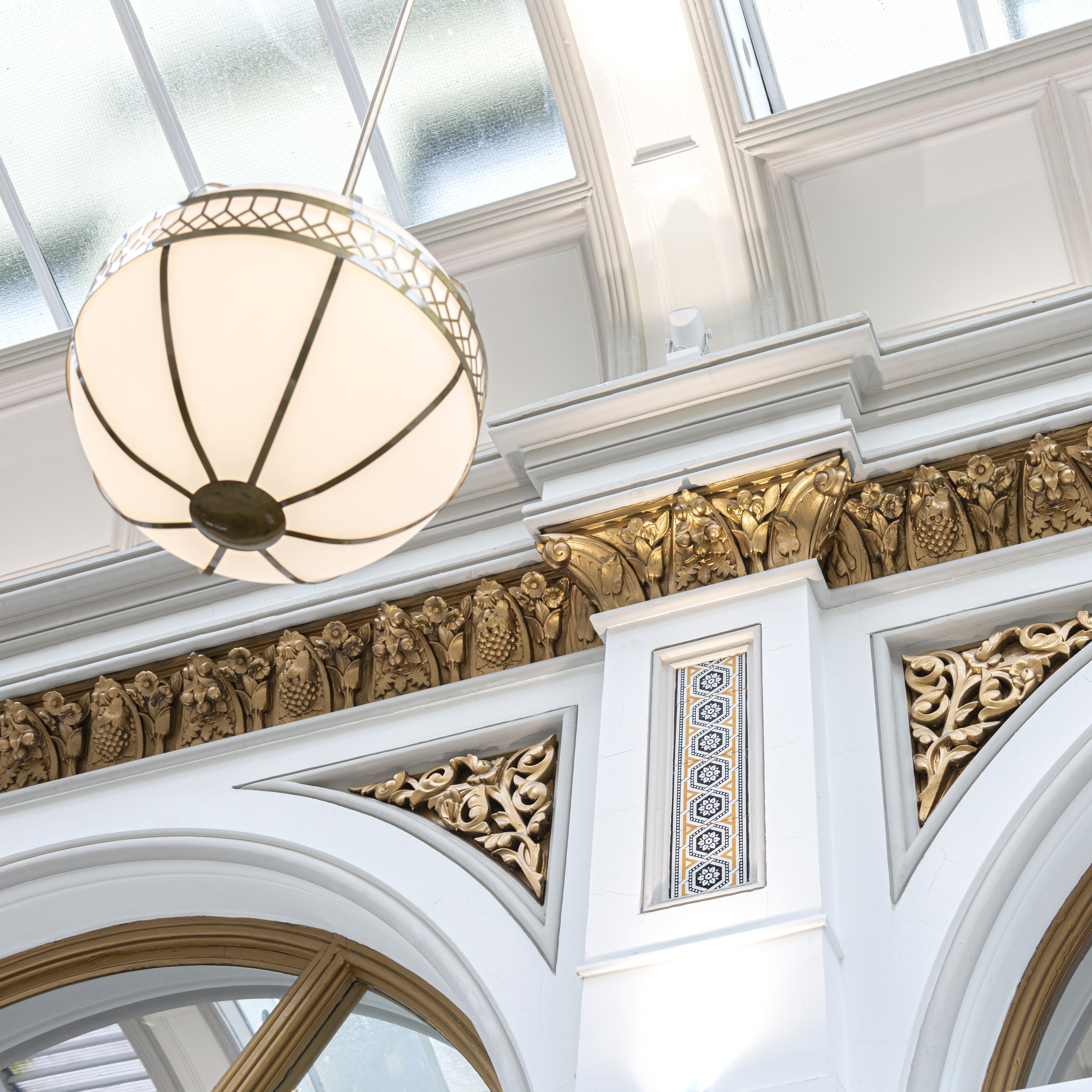
Designed by the architect James McKinnon and brought to life in 1880, Queen's Arcade has since undergone restoration to bring it back to its 19th century former glory.

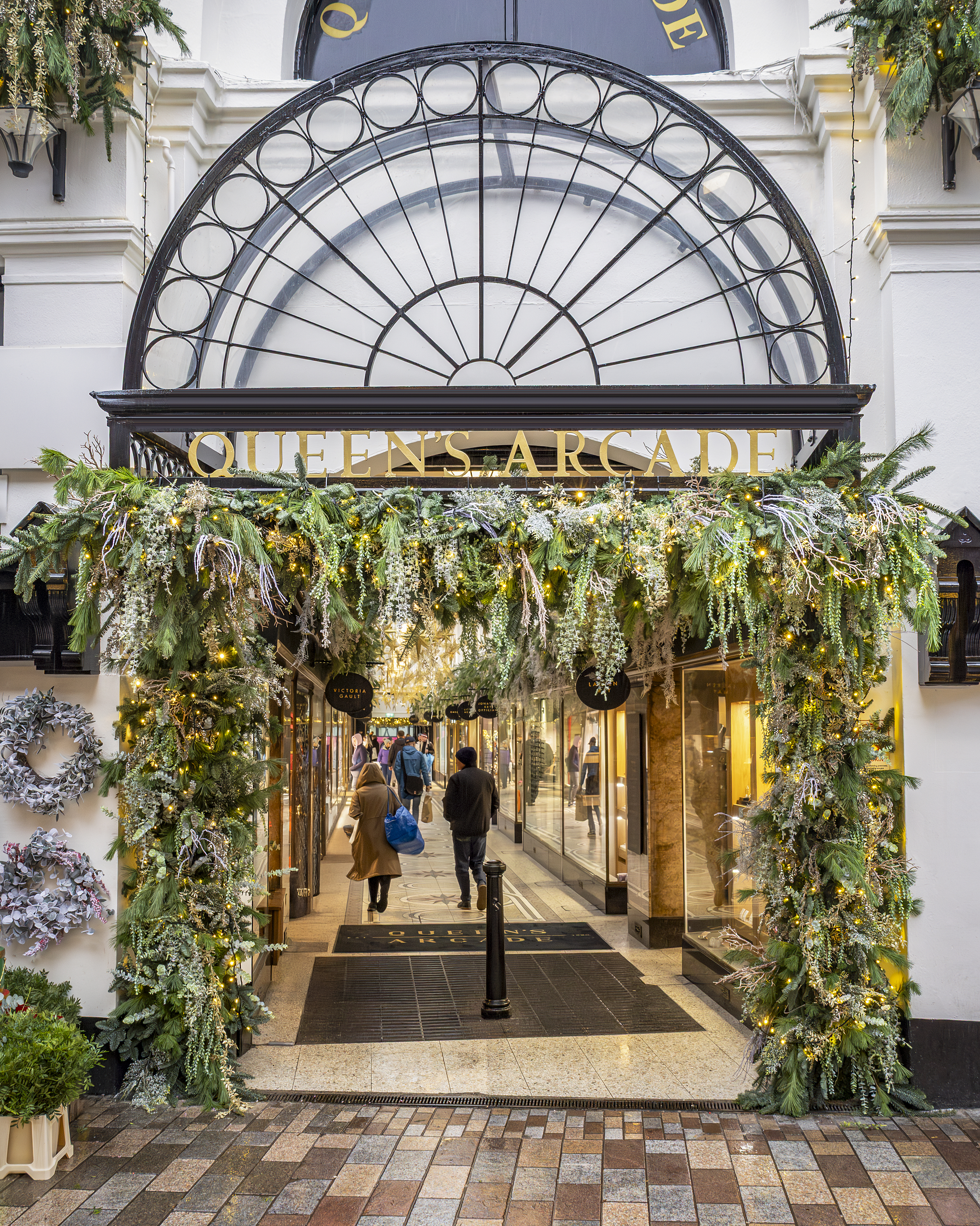
Fountain Street entrance. 120 years since it was born, Queen’s Arcade remains one of Belfast’s signature landmarks.

== See also ==
- Architecture of Belfast
- North Street Arcade
