= Vacuum (journal) =

Scientific journal of vacuum science

- Discipline: Vacuum engineering, materials science, surface science
- Language: English
- Edited by: Lars Hultman

Publication details
- History: 1951–present
- Publisher: Elsevier
- Frequency: Quarterly
- Impact factor: 4.3 (2025)

Standard abbreviations
- ISO 4: Vacuum

Indexing
- ISSN: 0042-207X (print); 1879-2715 (web)
- LCCN: 54017378
- OCLC no.: 612360611

Links
- Journal homepage; Online access; Online archive

Vacuum is a quarterly peer-reviewed scientific journal published by the Elsevier. Founded in 1951, the journal covers the fundamental research and technical advances in vacuum engineering, materials science and surface science. Its editor-in-chief is Lars Hultman (Linköping University).

== Abstracting and indexing ==
The journal is abstracted and indexed in:

- Chemical Abstracts Service
- Current Contents/Engineering, Computing & Technology
- Current Contents/Physical, Chemical & Earth Sciences
- EBSCO databases
- Ei Compendex
- Inspec
- ProQuest databases
- Science Citation Index Expanded
- Scopus

According to the Journal Citation Reports, the journal has a 2025 impact factor of 4.3.
