= The Vacuum =

The cover of the 'Bloody Foreigners' issue of The Vacuum, 2003, illustration by Duncan Ross.

The Vacuum is a free newspaper published in Belfast, Northern Ireland by the arts organisation Factotum.

Each issue is themed and contains critical commentary about the city and broader cultural issues. The paper is distributed in bars, cafés and other public spaces. It was first published in January 2003.

== A topical newspaper ==
Each issue of The Vacuum is centred on a topical theme, around which writers and artists are commissioned to produce articles and illustrations. These themes can be open-ended – such as in the 'Fantasy' issue when contributors were simply asked to describe one of their fantasies – or more specific such as the 'Nostalgia' issue which contained articles on 'Troubles Nostalgia' and 'Marketing Nostalgia'. Most issues contain a range of writing from social commentary, through satire to farce, focused on one area of discussion. Rarely does The Vacuum avoid controversy, no matter what its chosen issue. Some of the past topics have included:

The Cover of the 'God' issue of the Vacuum which, along with the 'Satan' issue caused protests in Belfast City Council.

- 'Food and Drink'
- 'Danger'
- 'Prison'
- 'Education'
- 'The End' (in the month it was threatened with closure, see below)
- 'Waste'
- 'Security'

Contributors to The Vacuum have included writers such as Glenn Patterson, Colin Graham, Leontia Flynn, Stephen Mullan, Daniel Jewesbury, John Morrow, Richard Kirkland, Newton Emerson, Roy Foster and the artists Duncan Ross and David Haughey.

== 2004 controversy ==
The Cover of the 'Sorry' issue of The Vacuum, part of a response to Belfast City Council's demand for an apology.

In June 2004 the two issues themed 'God' and 'Satan' were published simultaneously. Based on one complaint from a member of the public, some Belfast City councillors (Belfast City Council funded Factotum) denounced the publication as "filth" that was "encouraging devil worship" at their monthly Council meeting. The Council then withheld an agreed funding allocation of £3,300 until the newspaper apologised to the citizens of Belfast for any offence caused. The Vacuum responded by publishing a special 'Sorry' issue and holding a tongue-in-cheek, citywide 'Sorry Day' in December 2004.

Following this protest Richard West, one of the paper's editors (along with Stephen Hackett), challenged the Council's demand for an apology in the High Court as a breach of articles 9 and 10 of the European Convention on Human Rights. In May 2006 the case was lost. The case then went to the Court of Appeal and, as of May 2009, a judgement on this appeal is still awaited.

== The Vacuum post controversy ==
The Vacuum has continued to publish but now comes out intermittently. At least two recent issues (on the 'English' and 'Spin') have coincided with exhibitions organised by the publishers in the photography gallery Belfast Exposed. Both this gallery and the offices of The Vacuum are in the Cathedral Quarter, Belfast. There is a historical precedent for literary satire in the area; in the 19th century, the area was home to a Punch-style satirical magazine, The Northern Whig.
