= Emma Jordan =

Irish actress and theatre director

- Born: Mary Emma Jordan; Belfast, Northern Ireland
- Education: Queens university
- Alma mater: St Louise's Comprehensive College, Belfast
- Occupations: Actress, theatre director
- Writing career
- Notable works: street car named desire, border games

Emma Jordan is a Northern Irish actress and theatre director.

== Life ==
Emma Jordan was born in west Belfast where she attended St Louise's Comprehensive College. It was here that she started to study drama and got involved with the Marillac Theatre Company, based in the college.

== Work ==
Jordan worked for over a decade as an actor appearing in stage plays and on television.

Jordan then began working as a stage director, and she worked first as the artistic director of Prime Cut, the theatre company initially named Mad Cow. The aim of the company was to present internationally successful plays in Northern Ireland. These included Death and the Maiden, Endgame, American Buffalo, Shopping and F**king, A Place with the Pigs, and Oleanna. Prime Cut has premiered over 32 plays from countries such as France, Canada, Chile, South Africa and the United States, as well as work from the United Kingdom and Ireland. She has collaborated with the Bosnian theatre director Haris Pašovič in the production of The Conquest of Happiness for Derry~Londonderry UK City of Culture 2013. This production went on to tour to Belfast, Ljubljana, Sarajevo, and Mostar in co-production with Pašovič’s East West Theatre Company.

== Awards ==
- 2014 – Paul Hamlyn Foundation Breakthrough Award, worth £295,000 and enabled Prime Cut to perform outside Northern Ireland.
- 2018 – Best Director, Irish Theatre Award for production of One Good Turn
