= St Louise's Comprehensive College =

Coordinates: 54°35′9″N 5°58′8″W

St. Louise's Comprehensive College, Belfast Coláiste Naoimh Labhaoise, Béal Feirste
- 468 Falls Road, Belfast, BT12 6EN; Belfast; Northern Ireland

Information
- Type: Comprehensive School
- Religious affiliation: Roman Catholic
- Established: 1958
- Local authority: Education Authority (Belfast)
- Principal: Mary McHenry, BA(Hons), PGCE, MSc, PQH
- Age: 11 to 18
- Enrolment: 1500 (approx.)
- Colour
- Website: St. Louise's Comprehensive College

St. Louise's Comprehensive College (Irish: Colaiste Naoimh Labhaoise) is a comprehensive high school located in the Upper Falls Road, Belfast.

== History ==
St. Louise's was established in 1958. The religious order the Daughters of Charity of St Vincent de Paul was asked by the Catholic Church to take responsibility for this school. The college is named after St. Louise de Marrilac who co-founded the Daughters of Charity with St. Vincent de Paul.

Sister Genevieve (Mary) O'Farrell was appointed one of the first Principals. She held the position for 25 years during which period the school grew in size from 1,000 to 2,400 students becoming the largest single-sex school in Europe. In 2019/20 school year it has begun to accept boys as well as girls.

== Academics ==
St. Louise's offers instruction in a wide range of subjects. It offers technical and vocational courses alongside a large suite of academic subjects.

In 2006 it was recognised as one of the first Specialist Colleges in Northern Ireland with particular expertise in Performing Arts and Media.

In 2013 it was ranked the top, non-selective school in Northern Ireland at 5A* - C and has been the highest performing Belfast school for several years in a row.

At ‘A’Level, its value added scores have placed it in the top ten percent of schools across Britain for several years in succession. In 2026, 87% of its students who sat the A-level exams were awarded three A*-C grades. It is one of the few schools in Northern Ireland which has City and Guilds affiliation.

== Principals ==
- 1958-1963 - Sister Ita
- 1963-1988 - Sister Genevieve O'Farrell
- 1988-2005 - Sister Rosaleen
- 2005-2014 - Carmel McCartan
- 2014- Mary McHenry

== Notable alumni ==
- Brenda Murphy (b. 1954) - playwright
- Bronagh Taggart (b. 1961) - actor and writer
- Geraldine Hughes (b. 1970) - actor
- Clair Dobbin KC - lawyer
- Emma Jordan - actor and theatre director
- Mary O'Hara - journalist and writer
- Anthony Boyle (b. 1994) - actor
- Kristina O'Hara (born 1996) - boxer

== See also ==
- List of secondary schools in Belfast
