= Belfast Community Circus School =

School in Belfast, Northern Ireland

Coordinates: 54.602°N 5.926°W

Information
- Established: 1985; 41 years ago
- Website: https://circusful.org/

Belfast Community Circus School teaches young people from Belfast and its surrounding areas a variety of circus skills. The school's most recent director was Will Chamberlain, who died of cancer on 19 October 2017, after holding the position since 2000.

== Performances ==
The Belfast Community Circus School produces a number of shows featuring young people each year. Performances take place in the Circus School and on the streets, including annual shows in the Festival of Fools. The Circus School also programmes a season of street theatre running each Sunday over the summer months in Cotton Court in the heart of Belfast's Cathedral Quarter. Acts featured are a combination of artists based in Belfast and visiting artists from Europe, USA and Australia. In addition, the Belfast Community Circus School has established a social economy trading wing called Premiere Circus. This operates as an agency securing work for artists based in Belfast who work across Ireland.

== History ==
BCCS was set up in 1985 (41 years ago) by Jim Webster, Donal McKendry and Mike Moloney (1953–2013) to promote personal and community development through the teaching of circus skills. Throughout the height of the Troubles, BCCS was able to stage successful cross community projects across Northern Ireland. For more than a decade, BCCS operated workshops and created shows in a variety of venues ranging from church halls to community centres and the Crescent Arts Centre. In 1999 the Circus School took a massive step forward when it moved into Ireland's first dedicated circus building in the heart of Belfast's Cathedral Quarter - an area of the city centre promoting arts and culture. Since moving into the Gordon Street premises, BCCS has seen a massive growth in all aspects of its work including youth circus, professional development for artists, performances and outreach work. BCCS is widely known as a leading circus organisation in Northern Ireland.

Festival of Fools, an outdoor street performance and circus festival takes place in Belfast each May bank holiday weekend and is closely affiliated with BCCS and was founded by Will Chamberlain. In 2024 a documentary is being produced by Mark Cousins celebrating BCCS and will be presented by the Belfast Film Festival, encapsulating the idea of circus from Roman times to present day. It will be presented in 2025, marking the 40th anniversary of BCCS.

== Outreach ==
BCCS has many outreach programmes which involves travelling to youth and community centres to take workshops. They have programmes throughout Belfast and further afield. One programme they started in Lisburn has now become its own Circus School and functions separately from BCCS (Community Circus Lisburn). Due to lack of funding in 2020, Community Circus Lisburn closed its doors. Some members of CCL now attend BCCS and Streetwise Community Circus in Belfast.

== Links abroad ==
BCCS has links with many overseas circus schools, and often organises trips to visit them. One of the most notable links is with Tumble Circus. Two trips have been organised in recent years to train at the National Institute of Circus Arts in Melbourne, and other destinations have included Lima, Peru. Also, members of Circus Oz have visited Belfast and trained members of BCCS.
