= Craft Northern Ireland =

Regional development agency for crafts

Craft NI
- Website type: Cultural
- Creator: Collaborative
- Website: www.craftni.org
- Launched: 2004
- Current status: active

Craft Northern Ireland is the regional development agency for craft in Northern Ireland. In 2000, the Arts Council of Northern Ireland took formal steps to establish "an organisation to help shape and define the craft sector in Northern Ireland". Craft NI was set up in 2004 and is located in Cotton Court, Cathedral Quarter, Belfast.

Craft NI produces information and publicity about the craft sector. It represents Northern Ireland on national and international bodies including the UK National Advisory Panel for Craft, World Crafts Council, NI Employers Panel for Creative and Cultural Sector Skills Council. It develops partnerships with other agencies for strategic investment in the sector including the Arts Council of Northern Ireland and Invest NI.

In 2007, Craft NI hosted its first exhibition of contemporary craft from Northern Ireland. The work represented gave the first multi-disciplinary overview of craft in the region in the period from the 1980s to the first few years after 2000. In May 2007, the exhibition travelled to the S Dillon Ripley Centre, Smithsonian Institution as part of the Smithsonian Folklife Festival and Department of Culture, Arts and Leisure's Rediscover Northern Ireland programme.

August Craft Month is Northern Ireland's annual celebration of craft - a coordinated programme of events and activities that showcase the work of craft makers in Northern Ireland and from across the UK, Ireland and Europe.

Craft NI also runs a 2-year business incubation programme for designer-makers entitled 'making it'.
