= Sister Genevieve O'Farrell =

Irish educator (1923–2001)

Sister Genevieve O'Farrell (born Mary O'Farrell; 22 March 1923 – 29 December 2001) was an Irish educator and member of the Daughters of Charity of Saint Vincent de Paul. She served as the principal of St. Louise's Comprehensive College in Belfast, Northern Ireland from 1963 to 1988. She is most remembered for making St. Louise's an effective comprehensive school and for leading the school during The Troubles.

== Early life ==
Mary O'Farrell was born on 22 March 1923 in Tullamore in County Offaly, Ireland to William and Catherine (née McNeill). She was the youngest of five children and the only daughter. Her family went to mass every day, and Mary attended the school run by the Sisters of Mercy. She noted later in life that in her youth, she did not like nuns, writing that "their whole secretive way of life revolted" her. She was reluctant to enter religious life, but felt she had been called following an experience in school.

== Daughters of Charity of St. Vincent de Paul ==
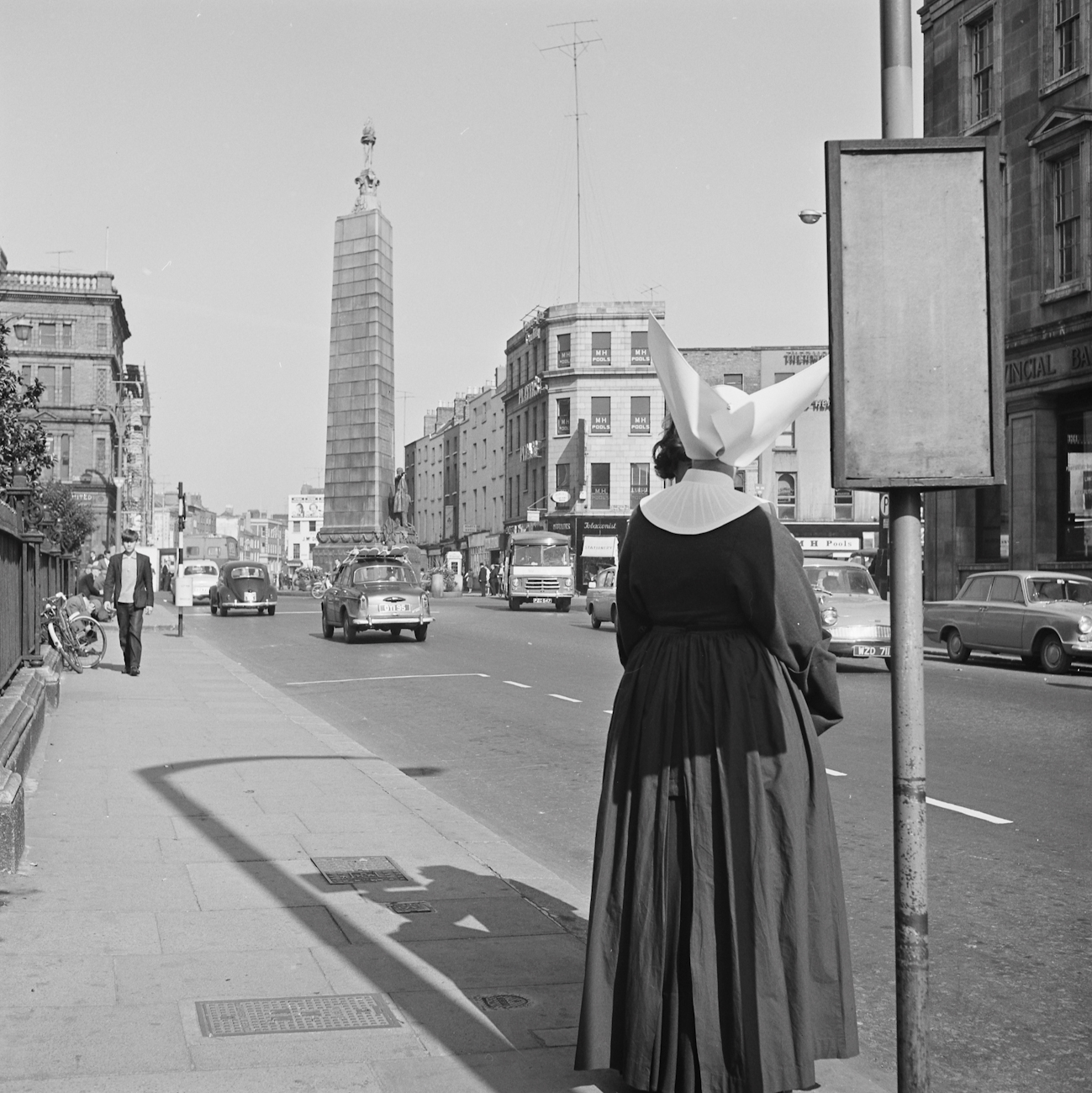
A Daughter of Charity depicted with their unique habit in Dublin, 1964. Sister Genevieve would have worn this until the habit was changed in September, 1964.

in 1941, at eighteen years old, she joined the Daughters of Charity of Saint Vincent de Paul, believing their mission to live in the world and serve the poor aligned most with her abilities and desire to make a difference. She began her training in Dublin, entering St. Catherine's Seminary at Blackrock in February 1942.

Mary was not interested in teaching, but she was sent to St. Joseph's Technical School for Girls in Manchester, England in 1943. She was given the name Sister Joseph and enrolled in a course at Victoria University, though she failed her final exams. She was then sent to Sedgley Park College of Education to obtain a teaching certification. She received her first official placement as a sister at an orphanage school for boys in Mill Hill where she was given the name Sister Genevieve. In 1950, she was sent to Lanark, Scotland to an orphanage, as well as to teach at St. Mary's Catholic Primary School, where she spent 6 years.

=== St. Vincent's Primary School ===
In 1956, Sister Genevieve was sent to St. Vincent's Primary School on Dunlewey Street, Belfast. At this time, Catholic West Belfast was one of the poorest districts in Western Europe. The school had been opened in 1900 to serve girls who worked in the linen mills, educating them on the days they did not work. The superior was Sister Vincent Wallace, who would become one of Sister Genevieve's greatest inspirations. Sister Vincent was deeply involved in the local community and knew the families of all of her students, a pattern Sister Genevieve would follow in her educational career.

== St. Louise's Comprehensive College ==
St. Louise's opened on 8 January 1958 with 850 students. It was located near the Falls Road in Belfast and mostly served students from poor backgrounds who could not attend St. Dominic's Grammar School due to their 11-plus results. Sister Genevieve served as the vice principal under Sister Ita Polley, one of her close friends. Following Sister Ita's illness, which limited her participation in the school, Sister Genevieve stepped in as principal in 1963 while Sister Ita became vice principal. Sister Genevieve stressed the importance of professional and academic qualifications and encouraged every student to leave with at least one qualification or certification, such as typing, bookkeeping, or Ordinary Levels. She eventually held mock interviews for students so they would be more likely to find employment after leaving school, as unemployment in the area was at times as high as 80%.

Sister Genevieve oversaw the development of the school's sixth form and effectively convinced many students to stay on after their required years of schooling to pursue A-levels. She also dedicated much of her time as principal to making St. Louise's an effective comprehensive school, one where students of differing academic abilities could be successful in the same school, rather than dividing the students based on ability and sending the best-performing students to a grammar school. St. Louise's catered to students of all ability levels, and some of her best students would go on to top universities, such as journalist Mary O'Hara who studied at Cambridge after finishing at St. Louise's.

When parents warned they would need to remove their daughter from school so she could work to support the family, Sister Genevieve used funds from the Daughters of Charity to pay the girls' wages and keep them in school. She encouraged the teaching of Irish despite its political implications, arguing that it was the national language and would keep the girls connected to their heritage. Sister Genevieve is remembered for having a strong-willed, determined personality, but also for caring very deeply about her students. She was a divisive figure for school administrators, but most students were fiercely loyal to her. During her time as principal, Sister Genevieve expanded the school from 1000 to 2400 students, making it the largest single-sex school in both Britain and Western Europe.

=== The Troubles ===
The Troubles was a time of political and nationalistic conflict in Northern Ireland that lasted from the 1960s to the late 1990s. Most of the conflict surrounded the political status of Northern Ireland: Unionists wanted Northern Ireland to remain part of the UK, while Irish Nationalists or Republicans wanted Northern Ireland to be unified with the Republic of Ireland. As violence broke out in the 1960s, the British Army was deployed and clashed with local paramilitary groups, like the IRA. St. Louise's was close to Milltown Cemetery, where the IRA buried their dead, and to British Army bases at Andersonstown Police Station and Macrory Park. Girls who attended the school came from Republican stronghold areas and some had family members who were directly involved in paramilitary activity. At least 20 girls' fathers were murdered during the Troubles, and many more were imprisoned.

Sister Genevieve worked to make the school a haven from the violence on the streets and stresses at home. When Catholic homes were burned on 14 August 1969, Sister Genevieve ferried families away in her car and opened the school as a temporary center for refugees. She insisted that education should be the girls' top priority and expected to see them in school regardless of events on the streets, only closing the school on the day of Bobby Sands' funeral. Many girls felt that the school was the only stable and safe place they had during the Troubles, and most appreciated Sister Genevieve's efforts to create a sense of normalcy.

Sister Genevieve condemned the violence of the Troubles and opposed the IRA. She trained girls in school to avoid being recruited by paramilitary groups, and visited her students that were imprisoned for their involvement.

In 1978, she received an OBE for her efforts at the school.

== Later years and legacy ==
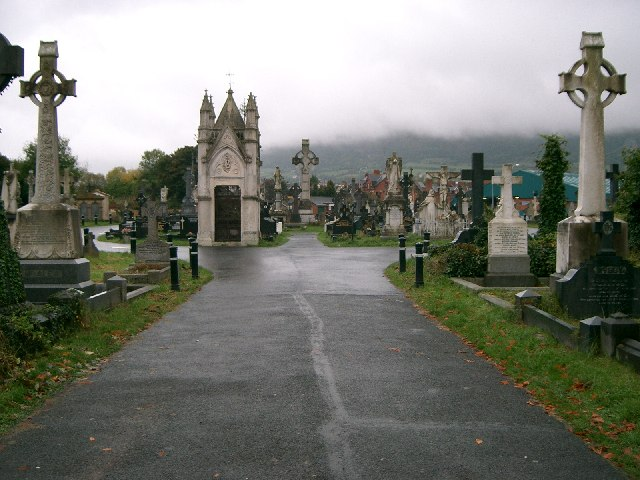
Milltown Cemetery, where Sister Genevieve is buried.

Sister Genevieve left St. Louise's in 1988. She had served as its principal for 25 years and had been at the school since its creation. She spent the rest of her life devoted to visiting long-term prisoners in the Long Kesh and Maghaberry prisons and helped many of them get degrees. She visited both Catholic and Protestant prisoners, including Robert Bates who had led the notorious Shankill Butchers. She served as a member on numerous councils, including the Queen's University senate, the Northern Ireland curriculum council, and the Northern Ireland commission on human rights. She received honorary degrees from Queen's University Belfast and the University of Ulster.

In 1994, Sister Genevieve suffered a stroke that took most of her ability to speak and left her in a wheelchair. She died at home in South Belfast on 29 December 2001. Her funeral was held at St. Peter's Cathedral on New Year's Day, 2002, and she was buried in Milltown Cemetery, near her mentor, Sister Vincent, and her friend and colleague, Sister Ita.

== Bibliography ==
- McCann, Joseph. "Sister Gen: A Case Study of Vincentian Leadership." Vincentian Heritage Journal 26, no. 1 (Fall 2005): 179–199.
- Rae, John. Sister Genevieve: A Courageous Woman’s Triumph in Northern Ireland. New York: Warner Books, 2003. OCLC 49795823.
