= Factotum (arts organisation) =

Artist collective founded in 2001

- The Factotum logo, derived from the definition of 'factotum' as 'a dogsbody'.
- Formation: 2001; 25 years ago
- Founder: Stephen Hackett and Richard West
- Headquarters: Belfast

Factotum is both an arts organisation and artists' project that was formed in 2001 by Stephen Hackett and Richard West. They publish The Vacuum newspaper, put on exhibitions, publish books and make films. In the past they have also run a choir, staged contemporary dance events and organised talks. In 2005 Factotum won a Paul Hamlyn Award for the Visual Arts and participated in Northern Ireland's first showing in the Venice Biennale. In 2007 they were selected for the Irish Curated Visual Arts Award by the artist Mike Nelson. Factotum's work often involves collaborating with a wide range of other arts organisations, artists and writers.

== Cultural history ==
Factotum are based in Belfast and their work is often about the city and its history. In 2003 they produced a book and CD called Belfast Songs in which a number of writers, including Glenn Patterson, Paul Muldoon and Leontia Flynn, each wrote about famous songs representing the city. Factotum's work is sometimes documentary or archival in nature, as in their 2005 photographic exhibition 'The English', which was largely made up of previously unseen photographs from the Imperial War Museum's archive of the British army in Northern Ireland in the 1970s and 80s. Their treatment of this historical material can involve an implied cultural criticism in the way it is recontextualised. The Factotum Choir, for example, sang a repertoire made up of songs in praise of Stalin (such as Ewan MacColl's "Ballad of Stalin"), corporate songs ("Fokker on the Wing") and national anthems for countries that no longer exist (such as Rhodesia). Factotum's exhibitions and publications can also be explicit in criticising attempts to rebrand and redevelop Belfast and the role of marketing and Public Relations in general, as in their 2008 show 'A Century of Spin' about PR photography.

== Parody and satire ==
As well as presenting historical material, Factotum's work also frequently involves elements of satire and parody. A special 'Cobbled Quarter' supplement to The Vacuum closely resembled the corporate freesheet 'Laganlines' published by the Laganside quango to promote their newly branded 'Cathedral Quarter'. It included such events as 'Hermitfest' and the 'Festival of Pathetic Maritime Disasters' much like the facepainting and Titanic themed events in the quango's publicity material. Sometimes it is not easy to distinguish between documentary and spoof elements of Factotum projects. In 2006 they put on an exhibition about the Factotum Choir in the Project Arts Centre in Dublin (subsequently toured to other venues). This exhibition contained film clips, artefacts (like record covers and a desiccated cat) and an extensive history of the Choir from the 1950s to 2000. Reviewers of the exhibition have been divided as to whether the material in the exhibition is genuine or fabricated. In 2009 Factotum organised an exhibition called 'Northern Ireland Unseen Offscreen' as part of the Belfast Film Festival. The exhibition was of posters for films made in Northern Ireland that were never completed or have subsequently been forgotten and included such titles as 'Cannibal Begorrah' (a horror film set in Fermanagh), 'An Ulster American Folk Park in London' (An 80s small town/ big city corporate drama), 'Dafty Wains Go Buck Mental' (An Ulster Scots gross-out comedy) and 'King Billy's Pink Adventure' (a 70s art house film). Reviewers of this exhibition have expressed scepticism as to how much, if any, of this material is genuine.

The building once used had the "headless dog" image on the brickwork outside. The scions of Hilden Brewery family set up College Green Brewery (though, in fact, a restaurant and not a brewery - ales are supplied by Hilden Brewery) and used the image as the logo for their "Headless Dog" ale.

== Ditching ==
In 2009 Factotum released the feature film Ditching, a story about two people going on a journey across Northern Ireland in a desolate post-apocalyptic future.
