= Cathedral Quarter Arts Festival =

The Cathedral Quarter Arts Festival is an annual festival of music, comedy, theatre, art and literature that takes place in Belfast, Northern Ireland. The first festival took place in May 2000. It has since primarily taken place in the first weeks of May in an area of Belfast known as the Cathedral Quarter, so-called because of its proximity to St Anne's Cathedral. The festival claims to offer a socially inclusive agenda and eclectic programming blend of "big names", emerging acts and fringe performances. The 2002 festival featured Zadie Smith, Nick Hornby and Irvine Welsh, and the debut of Martin Lynch's runaway hit History of the Troubles According to my Da. The festival will celebrate its 25th year in 2025.

== History ==
The Cathedral Quarter Arts Festival company was established in late 1999 by former teacher Sean Kelly and Martin Lynch, and the first festival took place in May 2000. It has since primarily taken place over eleven days in the first weeks of May in an area of Belfast known as the Cathedral Quarter, so-called because of its proximity to St Anne's Cathedral. It is an annual festival, and covers music, comedy, theatre, art and literature.

The festival claims to offer a socially inclusive agenda and eclectic programming blend of "big names", emerging acts and fringe performances, and one early reviewer of the festival's drama output in 2002 referred to it "as reaching parts of Belfast no other festival can reach", not least because the work of contemporary, Belfast-born writers featured in the programme. In the same year the books or literary strand of the Festival featured Zadie Smith, Nick Hornby and Irvine Welsh. The same year saw the debut of Martin Lynch (writer)'s runaway hit "History of the Troubles According to my Da" which soon transferred to the Grand Opera House, Belfast. Other years have included Bell X1, Alison Spittle, and Kevin McGahern.

Although funding cuts have reduced aspects of the programming, the festival is credited for platforming a more diverse range of performers and issues than had heretofore been seen in the socially conservative arts world of Northern Ireland - gay rights, trade unions, interfaith marriages, immigration, all represented elements of Kelly's "consciously international" programming. The festival will celebrate its twenty-fifth year in 2025. The 2020 festival was cancelled due to restrictions from the COVID-19 pandemic, but the festival returned in 2021.

== See also ==
- Belfast Festival at Queen's
- Belfast Film Festival
- Cathedral Quarter, Belfast
- Féile an Phobail
