= Lars Hultman =

Swedish physicist

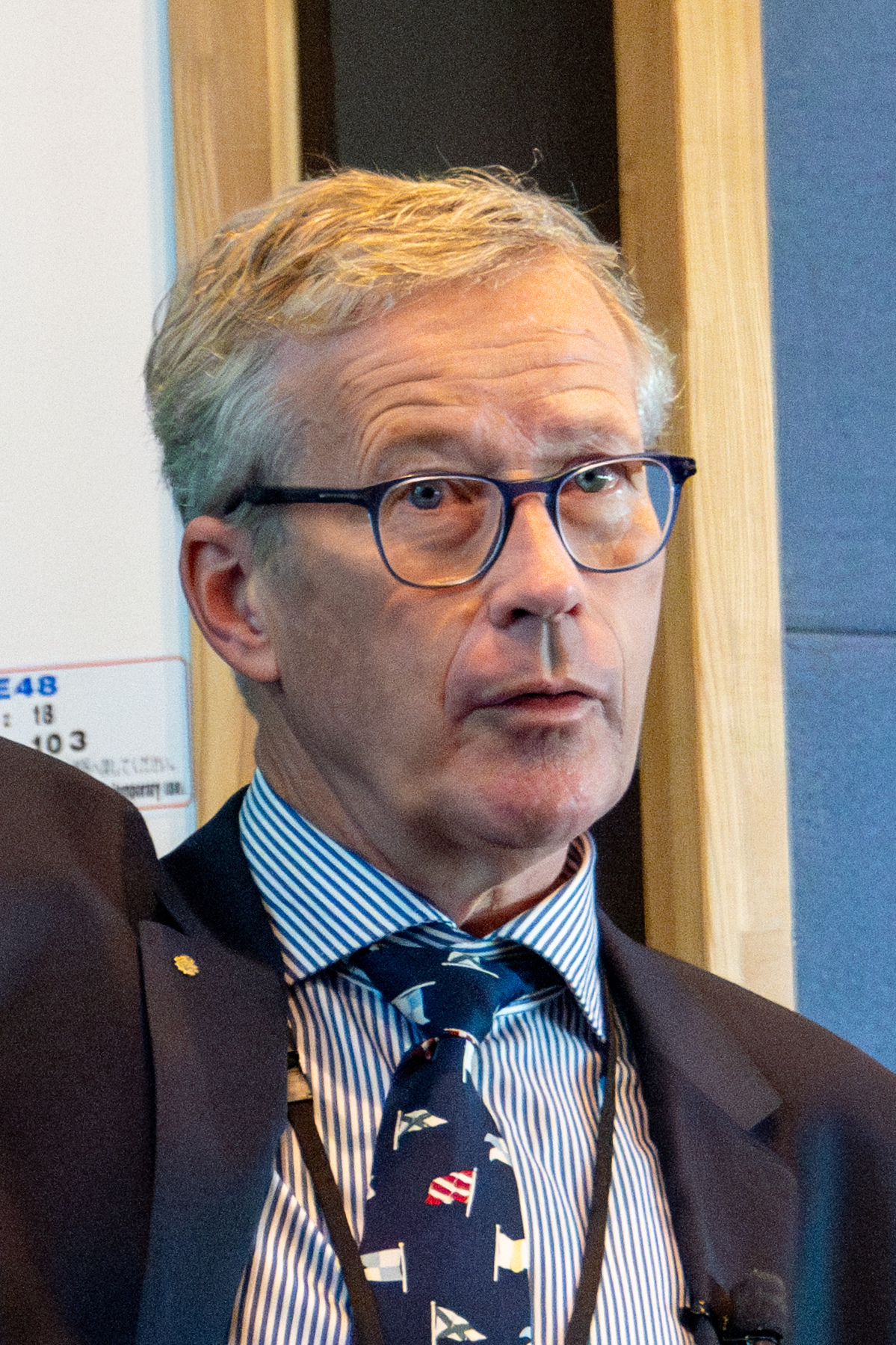
Lars Hultman at the Okinawa Institute of Science and Technology in 2024

Lars Hultman (born 1960) is a professor of materials science and head of the Division of Thin Film Physics at Linköping University.

Since June 2013 Hultman is the CEO of The Swedish Foundation for Strategic Research (SSF). He received his Ph.D. degree in Materials Science from Linköping University in 1988. He also did postdoctoral work at Northwestern University in 1989-1990 and was a visiting professor at University of Illinois at Urbana-Champaign in 2004-2006. In 1994 he became the editor for the journal Vacuum.

His research interests are in the materials science and nanotechnology of thin films by vapor phase deposition, in particular ion-surface interactions, microstructure evolution, and properties of advanced functional materials.

== Awards ==
- Akzo Nobel Sweden Science Award, 2013
- European Research Council, Advanced Grant.
- Member of the Royal Swedish Academy of Sciences, 2009.
- Member of the Royal Swedish Academy of Engineering Sciences, 2008.
- Fellow of the Forschungszentrum Dresden-Rossendorf, 2007.
- Fellow of the American Vacuum Society, 2006.
- Jacob Wallenberg Foundation Award for Materials Science, 2000.
