= Leontia Flynn =

Poet and writer from Northern Ireland

- Born: 1974 (age 51–52); Downpatrick
- Occupations: Professor; poet

Academic background
- Education: Queen's University Belfast
- Thesis: Reading Medbh McGuckian. (2004)

Academic work
- Discipline: Literature
- Sub-discipline: Poetry
- Institutions: Queen's University Belfast

Leontia Flynn is a poet and writer from Northern Ireland.

== Life and work ==
Leontia Flynn was born in Downpatrick, Co Down and grew up between Dundrum and Newcastle, Co Down. She attended Assumption Grammar School, Ballynahinch and afterwards began an English degree at Trinity College Dublin before dropping out. She completed a degree and later a PhD in English at Queen's University Belfast, and an MSc in writing and cultural politics at Edinburgh University. She is a professor at Seamus Heaney Centre at Queen's University where she has worked since 2005.

== Themes and influences ==
Flynn has written about family and psychological inheritance, as well as about her father's Alzheimer's disease. Her poems also sometimes address technology. She has described the sonnets in Drives as ‘wikipedia poems’.

== Critical reception ==
Flynn's work has been favourably reviewed by writers and critics. Tom Paulin wrote "smart as a whip, lyrical, always on point, Leontia Flynn's poems are the real, right thing." In The Irish Times, Philip Coleman posited that Flynn's place as one of the strongest and most skilful poetic voices of her generation.

In The Observer, where The Radio was Book of the Month, Kate Kellaway wrote: "Anybody with an interest in poetry should be reading Leontia Flynn. Those with no interest should be reading her too: she has what it takes to overcome resistance… I kept returning to poems for the sheer pleasure of them – no slog involved."

== Prizes ==
These Days won an Eric Gregory Award in manuscript in 2001, the Forward Prize for Best first collection in 2004 and was shortlisted for the Costa Prize.

In the same year Flynn was named one of twenty ‘Next Generation poets’ by the Poetry Book Society. Flynn received The Rooney Prize for Irish Literature, in 2008. Profit and Loss was Poetry Book Society's choice for Autumn 2013 and shortlisted for the T. S. Eliot Prize. Flynn won the Lawrence O’Shaughnessy Prize for Irish Literature in 2011, and the prestigious Ireland Fund's AWB Vincent Literary Award in 2014. The Radio was shortlisted for the T. S. Eliot Prize and won the Irish Times's Poetry Now award. Flynn was also shortlisted for the Michael Marks Award For Poetry Pamphlets for her 2021 pamphlet "Nina Simone is Singing".

In 2022 she was elected a Fellow of the Royal Society of Literature.

In 2024, she won the Cholmondeley Award for Taking Liberties.

== Books ==
=== Poetry ===
- Taking Liberties Jonathan Cape 2023; ISBN 1-787-33411-2
- The Radio Jonathan Cape 2017; ISBN 1-787-33008-7
- Profit and Loss Jonathan Cape 2011; ISBN 0-224-09343-6
- Drives Jonathan Cape 2008; ISBN 0-224-08517-4
- These Days Jonathan Cape 2004; ISBN 0-224-07197-1

=== Pamphlets ===
- Nina Simone is Singing Mariscat, 2021
- Slim New Book Lifeboat Press, 2020

=== Criticism ===
- Reading Medbh McGuckian Irish Academic Press, 2012

== See also ==
- Factotum (arts organisation)
