= Swedish Foundation for Strategic Research =

Swedish research foundation

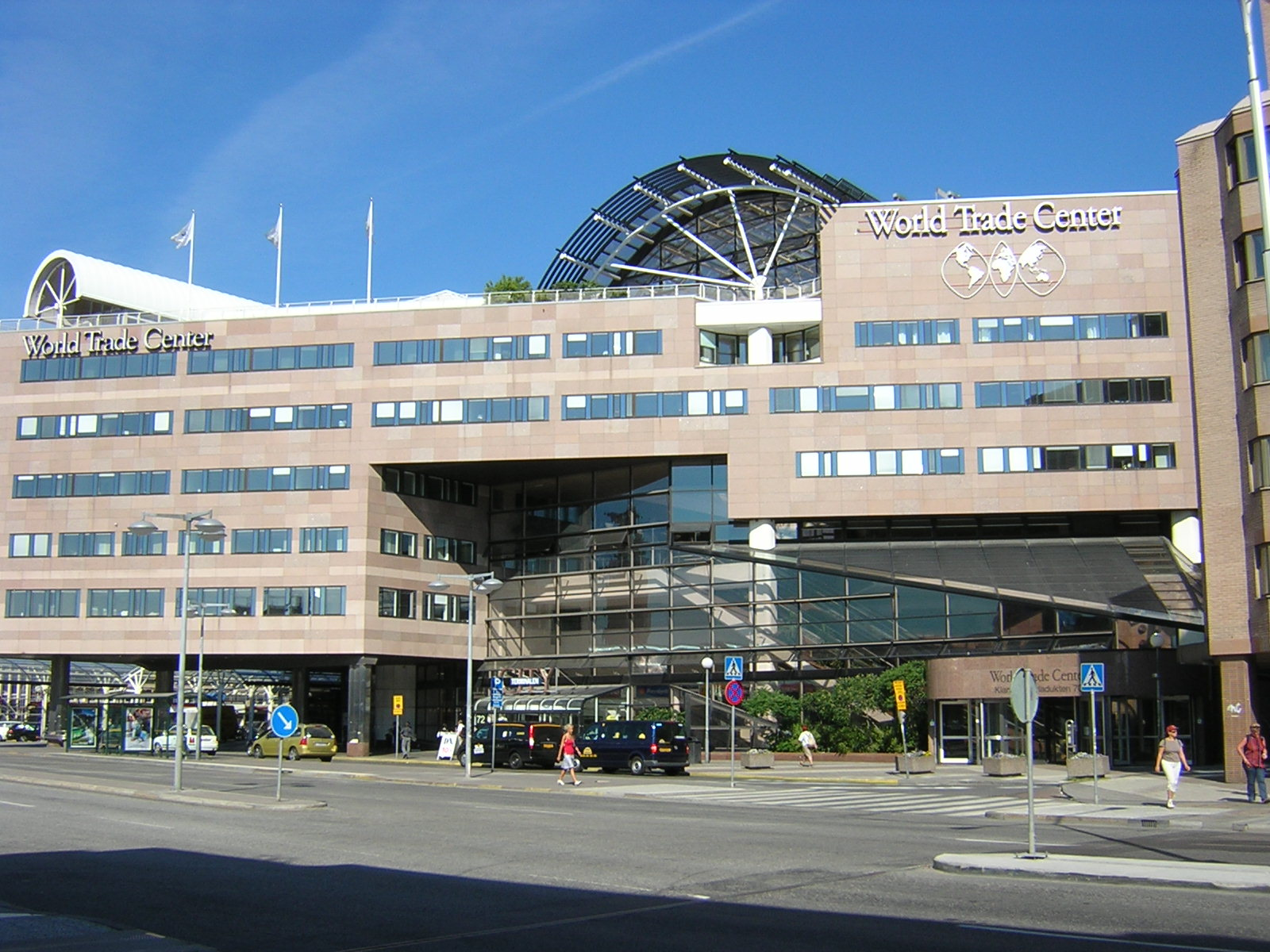
- World Trade Center in Stockholm
- Founded: 1994
- Location: Stockholm, Sweden
- Coordinates: 59°19′52″N 18°3′24″E
- Key people: Lars Hultman (CEO)
- Employees: 16 (2011)
- Website: www.stratresearch.se/en/

The Swedish Foundation for Strategic Research (Swedish: Stiftelsen för strategisk forskning, SSF) is a Swedish independent research-funding foundation. Its objective is to "support research in natural science, engineering and medicine that strengthens Sweden’s competitiveness". It is located in the World Trade Center in Stockholm, Sweden.

SSF was founded in 1994 by the Swedish government when the employee funds was discontinued under the Bildt Cabinet. When the Foundation was established in 1994 the government decided on a budget allocation of 6 billion. Almost 12 billion is distributed since then and in April 2014, the Foundation, thanks to good asset management and stock market growth, had a capital of about 11 billion. The funding of various projects by SSF in 2015 amounted to SEK 600,000,000.

== Research programs ==
SSF awards research grant of approximately SEK 600 million per year. SSF has funded graduate schools, a form of graduate programs that were important for the advent of the state-funded graduate schools.

Synergy Grant, former framework grants, supports a number of scientists from one large team of researchers or from a few independent research teams, co-located or at different colleges or institutes, which work together to solve an important research problem. SSF also supports strategic research centra. SSF also supports young scientists through programs as "future research leaders" and "Ingvar Carlsson Award". In an application form, mobility between universities and industry in both directions is stimulated.

== Executive directors ==
- 1994–1998: Ingvar Lindgren
- 1999–2005: Staffan Normark
- 2005–2012: Lars Rask
- 2012-2013: Torbjörn Fagerström
- 2013–present: Lars Hultman

== Reports and media ==
In August 2012, it was revealed by the Swedish newspaper Dagens Nyheter that the foundation had spent large sums of its money on a party and pr rather than research grants. Between 2009 and 2012, a total of SEK 9,300,000 was paid out to the party organizer and pr-consultant Micael Bindefeld.

Together with the economist Stefan Fölster the Foundation published the report "Every other job be automated within 20 years" in 2014, which had a great impact in society and in the media., The report is about the ongoing digitalization and what the consequences are for the Swedish labor market. The calculations are based on a previous study at Oxford University about the US labor market, and converted into the Swedish labor market. During the Almedalen 2014 the Foundation held a seminar entitled "Busy Doing Nothing" with the same theme and with Andrew Mcafee, author of the book "The Second Machine Age", as the main speaker, which also received great attention in the media.

The following year, in 2015, SSF published the follow-up of the new jobs that can be created due to digitization, "The new jobs in the automation era".

In Almedalen in 2016 the Foundation arranged the seminar "Villain, sick or family - who will have your DNA?" and issued a report with the same name, also received media attention.,
