= Mary O'Hara (journalist) =

Journalist and writer

- Born: Mary O'Hara; Belfast, Northern Ireland
- Education: University of Cambridge
- Occupations: Journalist, writer

Mary O'Hara is a journalist, writer and anti-poverty activist.

== Life ==
Mary O'Hara was born in west Belfast where she attended St Louise's Comprehensive College before proceeding to the University of Cambridge. She read Social and Political Science at Magdalene College where she was awarded a college scholarship.

== Work ==
After leaving university she worked for a year at Capital Radio in London. She then worked for ten years as a journalist at The Guardian and The Observer. She was awarded an Alistair Cooke Fulbright Scholarship which enabled her to spend one year at the University of California Berkeley where she conducted research on press coverage of mental illness. On return to the UK, she has worked free-lance having material published in The Guardian, the New Statesman, and Salon.

She has published a series of books and book chapters on austerity and poverty.

She has been actively involved in various anti-poverty campaigns. She founded Project Twist-It, a multi-platform anti-poverty initiative challenging negative stereotypes surrounding poverty. She has also been a producer on Getting Curious, a weekly podcast with Jonathan Van Ness.

== Productions ==
=== Books ===
- Austerity Bites: A journey to the sharp end of the cuts in the UK (Policy Press, 2014)
- The Shame Game: Overturning the toxic poverty narrative (Policy Press, 2020)

=== Films ===
- Beyond the Railings

== Honorary positions and Awards ==
- Chair, David Nobbs Memorial Trust
- Trustee, Arts Emergency
- Fellow, Royal Society of Arts
- International Columnist of the Year in 2017 and 2018 by the Los Angeles Press Club Southern California Journalism Awards for her Guardian column, Lesson From America
- Mind Journalist of the Year
