= Tribeca Belfast =

- Location within Greater Belfast

General information
- Location: Belfast, Northern Ireland
- Coordinates: 54.601°N 5.929°W

The Tribeca Belfast development, formerly known as North East Quarter and previously Royal Exchange, is a planned £500 million development based in the north east of Belfast City Centre. It is a major mixed-use regeneration scheme, with a total area of 1.5 million sq ft (0.14 million m^{2}) as of 2018. The development has generated controversy since its inception in 2003. Over the years, opposition has been levelled against its lack of care towards existing important built heritage, lack of integration with local small businesses and arts organisations and even its brand name, and much of its existence so far has been in the context of an arson attack on one of the existing buildings in 2004, while under the ownership of the developers.

== Concept and scope ==
The development area covers a number of streets in the north-east of Belfast city centre.

The Northern Ireland Department for Social Development (DSD) first coined the name "North East Quarter" in their masterplan for the area published in 2005. During the project's life it has been proposed and redesigned a number of times, while under the ownership of different companies. In 2006 Royal Exchange (Ltd), a consortium made up of Leaside Investments Ltd (itself a partnership of Ewart Properties and Snoddon Ltd) and Dutch firm ING Real Estate, were initially chosen by the DSD as preferred developer for the site.

=== Ewart Properties ===
Under Ewart Properties, the Royal Exchange development was announced as a £360 million retail-led mixed use regeneration scheme, which was to include premium brand shopping, living and complementary amenities. The concept was based on the development of a new department store alongside two further major stores, complementary high quality retail, restaurants, bars, cafes, apartments and offices (at upper levels). A hotel was to be located between Lower North Street and Church Street, with frontages onto Lower North Street, Church Street and Writers' Square. It was proposed that a 700-space, two-level basement car park would be located between Lower North Street and Donegall Street, also providing a service area for the hotel and department store. The car park was to be accessed and exited from Lower North Street. Cultural accommodation was proposed within the former Northern Bank building, which was identified for a small theatre, studios, community art gallery with a small amount of speciality retail. The total floor area of the scheme was in the region of 800,000 sq ft (74,000 m^{2}) which included approximately 420,000 sq ft (39,000 m^{2}) of retail.

The development later grew to a total size of 1.2 million sq ft (0.11 million m^{2}).

=== Castlebrooke Investments ===
Under Castlebrooke Investments, the project grew further, to a total of 1.4, and later 1.5 million sq ft (0.14 million m^{2}). The scope of the project was now to focus more on residential and office space than the retail-led proposals previously submitted, while adding a second hotel to the plan.

As of May 2018, two proposals are currently in effect:

- Phase 1b comprises office (97,000 sq ft [9,000 m^{2}]), retail (29,000 sq ft [2,700 m^{2}]), cafe/restaurant (17,000 sq ft [1,600 m^{2}]), residential (6 units) and community use (11,000 sq ft [1,000 m^{2}]) and associated public realm and landscaping. The proposed location covers lands bounded by Royal Avenue, Rosemary Street, North Street and Lower Garfield Street.
- An overall planning application named the Former Royal Exchange, covering lands bounded by Royal Avenue – York Street and Church Street to the north, Royal Avenue to the west, Rosemary Street and High Street to the south and Donegall Street to the east. A triangle of land bounded by Royal Avenue, Lower Garfield Street and North Street lies outside the application site boundary. The application calls for demolition and redevelopment of a large number of structures in the area.

== Development history ==
=== Ewart Properties, 1999–2015 ===
In 1999, Ewart Properties and John Laing/MECP proposed the "Gateway Project" which would combine land owned by Ewart in the North East Quarter of Belfast City Centre with John Laing/MEPC's proposed extension of CastleCourt into Smithfield. The joint project was dropped when the DSD chose Victoria Square as its preferred comprehensive regeneration project.

In July 2003 the DSD published its Belfast City Centre Regeneration Policy Statement, which was adopted by the DSD in April 2004.

In April 2004, a major segment of the existing buildings in the area, the North Street Arcade, was subjected to an arson attack which destroyed the businesses and decor inside the building, while leaving the structure and its two façades intact. A number of suspects were questioned by police in relation to the incident, but no one was prosecuted.

In June 2004 the DSD reviewed developer proposals for the North East Quarter and performed an appraisal against the newly adopted RPS. It found that none of the proposals fulfilled the objectives of the RPS, however having reviewed a proposal by Leaside Investments Ltd and ING Real Estate, in autumn 2004 the DSD gave the consortium first refusal for development of the area. In August 2005 the DSD published a masterplan for the North East Quarter.

In September 2005 the DSD reviewed projects submitted to it for the Royal Exchange and redevelopment of nearby CastleCourt shopping centre. On 28 March 2006 the Royal Exchange development was chosen as the preferred development, and Royal Exchange Ltd (a consortium of Leaside Investments Ltd and ING Real Estate) was chosen by the DSD as preferred developer for the site. The scheme was announced by the government on 28 March 2006 and was expected to be completed by 2011. In February 2008 the DSD announced that it had agreed heads of terms with the developers. In November 2008 Belfast City Council gave William Ewart properties and Snoddons Construction nine months to bring forward plans. The council said that it had yet to hear any proposals.

In December 2009 a development agreement was signed to develop the North East Quarter as a mixed-use project called Royal Exchange. Leaside Investments commented on the agreement, to say that "the company has been acquiring properties in the area for almost 20 years and to date has invested £40m to get to this stage". Leaside Investments submitted the Royal Exchange planning application to the Department of the Environment's Planning Service in October 2010. In September 2012 the scheme was approved by Environment Minister Alex Attwood. ING Real Estate had withdrawn from the Royal Exchange Ltd consortium some time beforehand. In an announcement regarding the approval being granted, the minister stopped short of providing a timescale for the project, due to the economic climate at the time. Under this approval, redevelopment of properties on Garfield Street began.

=== Cerberus Capital Management, 2015–2016 ===
In May 2015 a portfolio of property loans, including loans associated with Royal Exchange, were purchased from RBS Capital Resolution (Ulster Bank) by an entity affiliated with Cerberus Capital Management. The development agreement between the DSD and Leaside Investments Ltd was terminated in November 2015. The Department for Social Development admitted that the project had been abandoned, and that in the meantime it had commissioned a study to "examine the relationship between retail, leisure and commercial office investment in the continuing regeneration of Belfast".

=== Castlebrooke Investments, 2016–present ===
In January 2016, the scheme and all associated properties were bought from Cerberus Capital Management by London-based Castlebrooke Investments, which appointed architects Chapman Taylor to draw up new plans for the development. In October 2016, two companies associated with Castlebrooke Investments, PG Ltd and Savills, submitted a planning application to vary the conditions of the originally granted Royal Exchange planning permission. Permission was granted by the Department for Infrastructure in January 2017.

In February and June 2017, Castlebrooke Investments held public consultation events on a proposed scheme bound by Royal Avenue, Donegall Street, North Street, Lower Garfield Street and High Street. In September 2017 PG Ltd and Savills submitted a planning application proposing redevelopment of the area known as Phase 1b (lands bound by Royal Avenue, Rosemary Street, North Street and Lower Garfield Street). In October 2017 a further application was submitted encompassing the full area as far as Donegall Street to the west, Rosemary Street and High Street to the south and Royal Avenue – York Street and Church Lane to the north. On 17 March 2018, Belfast City Council approved the Phase 1b development almost in its entirety. The only application not approved at the time was for partial demolition of the boundary wall to the First Presbyterian Church on Rosemary Street.

==== Tribeca Belfast re-launch ====
In November 2018, Castlebrooke Investments announced that it was re-branding the development "Tribeca Belfast", mirroring developments of the same name in New York and Liverpool, and based on an acronym of a description of the area; the "triangle beside the cathedral". The announcement was met with widespread criticism, including from the then Lord Mayor of Belfast, Deirdre Hargey, and from Amnesty International NI, that it was not representative of the heritage of the city, nor its people. The director of Castlebrooke Investments, Estelle Hunt, defended the name, saying that a project of this scale in Belfast in an important location will "always attract a lot of debate". She said, "we believe (Tribeca Belfast) reflects the aspirations of the city and feel this will place Belfast in the strongest position for a sustainable and successful future."

On re-launching the scheme, Hunt stated that "we have refocused... and increased the office and residential offering, placing the emphasis on Belfast as one of the most desirable places in the world to live and work... In due course we will be engaging with the people of Belfast to discuss our detailed proposals for the site."

In January 2019 an official motion against the name was passed by Belfast City Council as it was felt that it was "not suitable for Belfast". The motion was supported by cross-party representatives including the DUP and Sinn Féin.

== Opposition to the project ==
Although efforts to revitalise the area have been welcomed, the plans lodged by William Ewart in 2003 were widely criticised by arts groups and residents, who feared it would do little to regenerate the area. Highlighted concerns included the substantial loss of listed heritage buildings and the demolition of buildings within the Cathedral Conservation Area and City Centre Conservation Area.

=== North Street Arcade ===
As of 2017 the scheme includes the demolition of the listed 1936 North Street Arcade by Cowser and Smyth (with retention only of its façades). This building, with a distinctive curved plan form, is the only example of a 1930s shopping arcade in Northern Ireland, and is one of only a handful left in the whole of the UK. The North Street Arcade was badly damaged as a result of an arson attack in April 2004, while under the ownership of the developers at the time when it housed 23 arts organisations and independent traders; and the Cathedral Quarter area was seen as the traditional home of arts organisations in the city. Criticism has also been placed on the planned retail scheme because of its supposed conflict with public policy in terms of traffic in the city centre, urban living, conservation of buildings and public consultation.

=== Save the Cathedral Quarter ===
A new organisation named "Save the Cathedral Quarter" was created in opposition to the proposed plans. The Cathedral Quarter Steering Group also raised opposition, as did the Ulster Architectural Heritage Society (UAHS), which has been prominent in pushing for better restoration-based approaches and in particular the retention of the North Street Arcade. In 2005 the UAHS placed the arcade on its first Buildings At Risk Register for Northern Ireland (BARNI), where it remains as of 2018.

Despite numerous versions of plans and applications being produced since 2003, and changes in hands of the owners and developers, the views of the campaign groups have not been fully addressed, and Save the Cathedral Quarter continues to fight against the proposals. In 2017 after new plans were drawn up by Chapman Taylor for current owners Castlebrooke Investments, traders raised fears of being pushed out of the area, and Belfast playwright Martin Lynch also added his voice to the campaign.

When Castlebrooke Investments' plans were approved in March 2018, the campaign groups vowed to continue to fight against the development. In November 2018, when the project was re-launched as "Tribeca Belfast", Save the Cathedral Quarter added their criticism to widespread derision of the new name, stating that it was "nothing more than a superficial branding exercise". Rebekah McCabe, chair of the organisation, stated that despite the rebrand, the content of the proposed redevelopment plans hadn't changed, including plans to demolish a "series of non-listed heritage buildings" as well as its concerns over the "displacement of a thriving community of local artists and traders" and therefore the organisation maintained the objections it had been raising since its formation.

== See also ==
- North Street Arcade
- Victoria Square
