= Brenda Murphy (playwright) =

Irish writer, playwright and screenwriter

- Born: Brenda Murphy; 1954 (age 71–72); Belfast, Northern Ireland
- Education: St Louise's Comprehensive College, Belfast
- Occupation: Playwright

Brenda Murphy is an Irish playwright.

== Life ==
Brenda Murphy was born in west Belfast in 1954. She was the eldest of 10 siblings but never knew her father. He was married to another woman who lived nearby with his own family. As a teenager she joined the Provisional Irish Republican Army, was convicted of having guns and spent several years in jail. She gave birth to her first child while in prison.

== Work ==
She has written a series of plays often set in working class Belfast which deal with contemporary issues such as the Troubles. She has often worked in collaboration with the Brassneck Theatre Company. Her plays have been performed at the Edinburgh Festival.

=== Plays ===
- Binlids: the Story of West Belfast Resistance
- Forced Upon Us
- Working-class Heroes
- Two Sore Legs
- A Night With George
- Baby it's cold outside
- ˜Crazy

== See also ==
- List of Irish writers
