= Paul Smith (Irish writer) =

- Born: 4 October 1920; Dublin, Ireland
- Died: 11 January 1997 (aged 76); Dublin, Ireland
- Writing career
- Language: Playwright

Paul Smith (4 October 1920, Dublin, Ireland – 11 January 1997, Dublin) was an Irish writer and playwright.

== Biography ==
Smith was born near Charlemont Street in Dublin, the son of a wheelwright. He left school when he was 8 to work his first job driving a Donkey and Coal cart. He became involved with the Gate Theatre at 16 years of age. In Ireland, he worked as a costume maker and designer in the Abbey Theatre and Gate Theatre, both in Dublin. He went to London in the 50s and then on to Sweden, where he started writing. He then moved to America and soon after to Australia, where he settled in Melbourne for some years. While there, he wrote The Countrywoman (1962), The Stubborn Season (1962), and 'Stravanga (1963). He returned to Dublin in 1972 where he remained until he died on 11 January 1997.

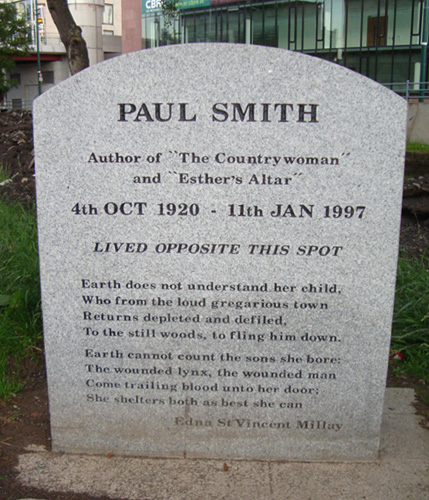
Memorial to Paul Smith, near the Grand Canal, Dublin

He was awarded the American Irish Foundation Literary Award in 1978 and was a member of Aosdána, an Irish association of artists.

== Works ==
- Esther's Altar (NY: Abelard-Schuman 1959), later reprinted as Come Trailing Blood (London: Quartet Books 1977)
- The Stubborn Season (London: Heinemann 1961)
- The Countrywoman (London: Heinemann 1962)
- ’Stravanga (London: Heinemann 1963)
- Summer Sang in Me
- Annie (NY: The Dial Press 1972 later London: Pan Books Ltd. 1987)
- Esther's Altar, performed in Los Angeles (1978)
