= Belfast Film Festival =

Irish film festival

- Opening film: 29 October 2026 Lost City - Dir. Séan Murray
- Closing film: 7 November 2026 I See Buildings Fall Like Lightning - Dir. Clio Barnard
- Location: Belfast, County Antrim, Northern Ireland
- Founded: 1995
- Language: English, Irish, mixed
- Website: http://www.belfastfilmfestival.org

The Belfast Film Festival (BFF) is an annual film festival in Northern Ireland with an attendance over 25,000. BFF includes the Docs Ireland international documentary festival, as well as the 'Sparks' Equality Diversity and Inclusion programme. The festival hosts year-round film screenings around Belfast.

== History and description ==
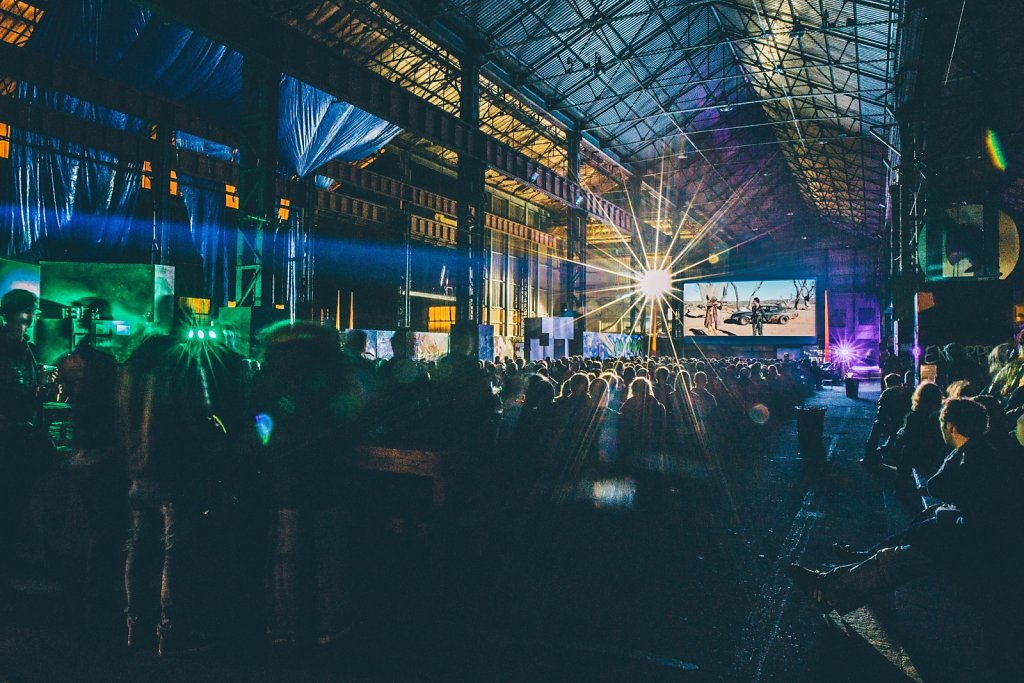
Belfast Film Festival's screening of Mad Max at T13

Co-founded in 1995 by Michele Devlin and writer Laurence McKeown, the festival began as a part of Féile an Phobail, and operated as the West Belfast Film Festival (WBFF) from 1995 to 2000. In its third and fourth years, WBFF ran as an independent event and included venues throughout the city. In the year 2000 it became the Belfast Film Festival and expanded into a citywide event. In 2003, the line-up grew to 70 films.

On 17 April 2004, the North Street Arcade suffered a huge fire that completely the internal part of the building. Despite losing their base and all their records, the festival recovered, relocated to Donegall St, and staged the event again the following year. The 2005 festival was launched by award-winning actor Stephen Rea. By 2016, the festival expanded to a total of 133 films from 30 countries.

BFF's patrons are: Terry George, David Holmes, Pat Murphy, William Crawley, and Stephen Rea.

Belfast Film Festival is sponsored by NI Department for Communities, Arts Council NI, Film Hub NI, Yellow Moon, British Council, Belfast City Council, Northern Ireland Screen and the British Film Institute.

== Sections and events ==
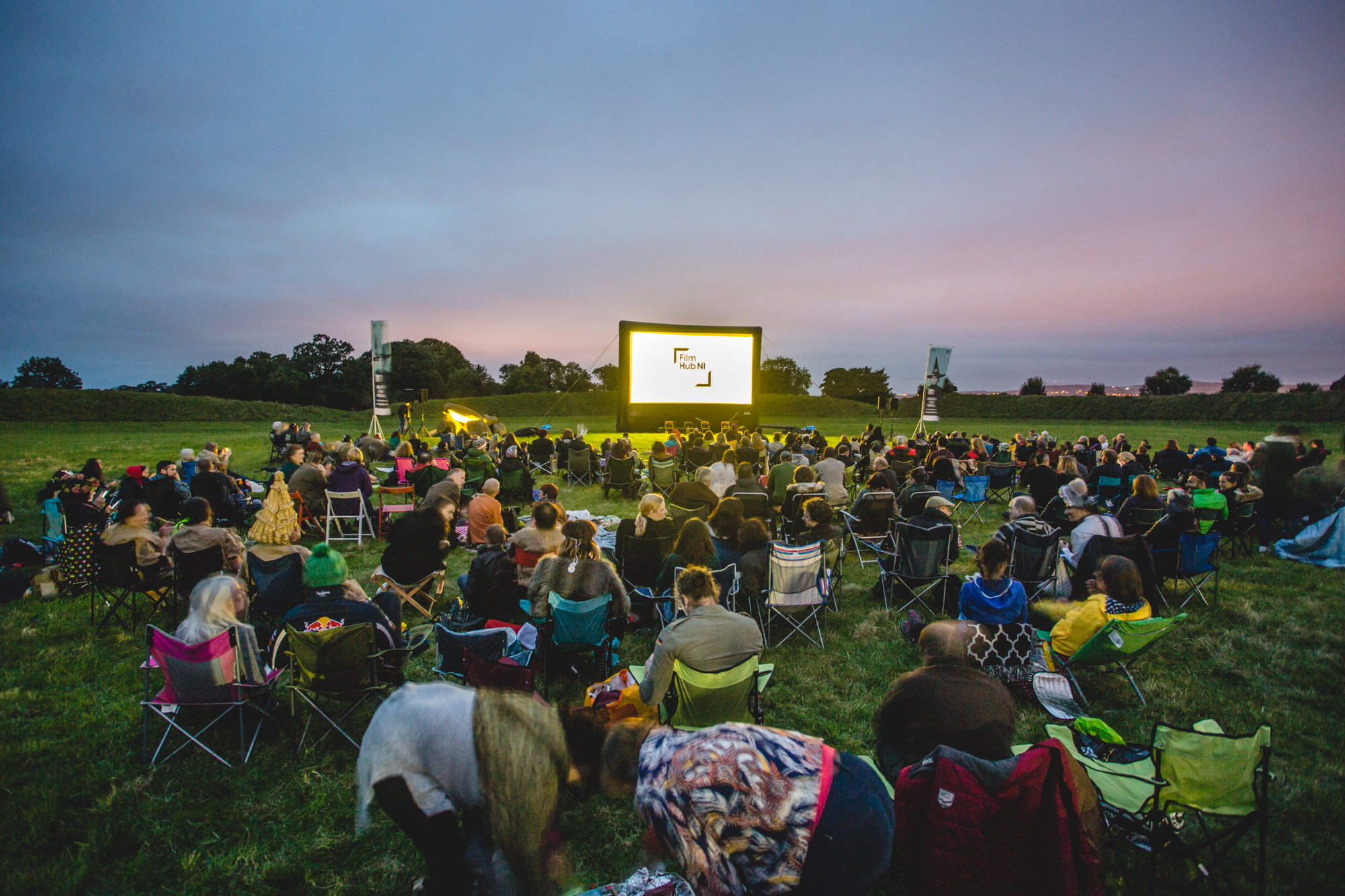
Belfast Film Festival's screening of The Wicker Man at the Giant's Ring

Site-specific screenings are a signature part of the festival. Through the years, the management team strived to include people and the fabric of the city in the program. They have screened films in used and disused swimming pools, on a boat in the River Lagan, with live piano accompaniment in St Anne's Cathedral (16mm original version of The Hunchback of Notre Dame). Carol Reed's Odd Man Out beside the Albert Clock, which featured heavily in the film. BFF hosted screenings at unique architectural sites, including the US political drama The West Wing at Parliament Buildings, Stormont, Oh, Mr Porter! at the Ulster Folk and Transport Museum, Cultra, The Warriors in a dystopian landscape beneath a city center motorway flyover, and Stanley Kubrick's cult sci-fi epic 2001: A Space Odyssey in the historic dry dock in the city's old shipyards where the RMS Titanic last sat on dry ground. The 2017 screenings of The Exorcist and The Omen were made in the former Holy Rosary Church on the Ormeau Road in south Belfast, which was deconsecrated for almost 40 years. Still, some criticized the choice of the location as insensitive and disrespectful. In 2026 Little Shop of Horrors 40th Anniversary outdoor screening in Botanic Gardens by the Tropical Plant House.

In partnership with Belfast One, BFF hosts Belfast Summer Cinema, a 2-day event hosted in the City Hall. In 2018, it piloted Pull Focus, a two-day summer festival of Irish documentary, this expanded to become Docs Ireland, international documentary festival .

Music has also featured strongly in BFF's programming; some highlights include the collaborations with local talents such as Duke Special and David Holmes on audiovisual performances, hosting the Italian progressive rock band Simonetti's Goblin to perform a live score to Dawn of the Dead; and many more.

Additionally, every year the festival hosts various special events. Belfast Film Festival also sponsors year-round film screenings around Belfast.

In 2019, the documentary section was separated into an independent festival, Docs Ireland. It is operated by the same team, but has its own program, industry section, etc. The festival's industry section, the marketplace, spans for two days and offers filmmakers the possibility to pitch their projects, meet sponsors, distributors and exhibitors. Other sections are: Pull Focus Irish Documentary Competition, Irish Shorts Programmes, New International Documentary, and Back to the Archive.

== BFF Award Winners ==
=== Short Film Competition ===
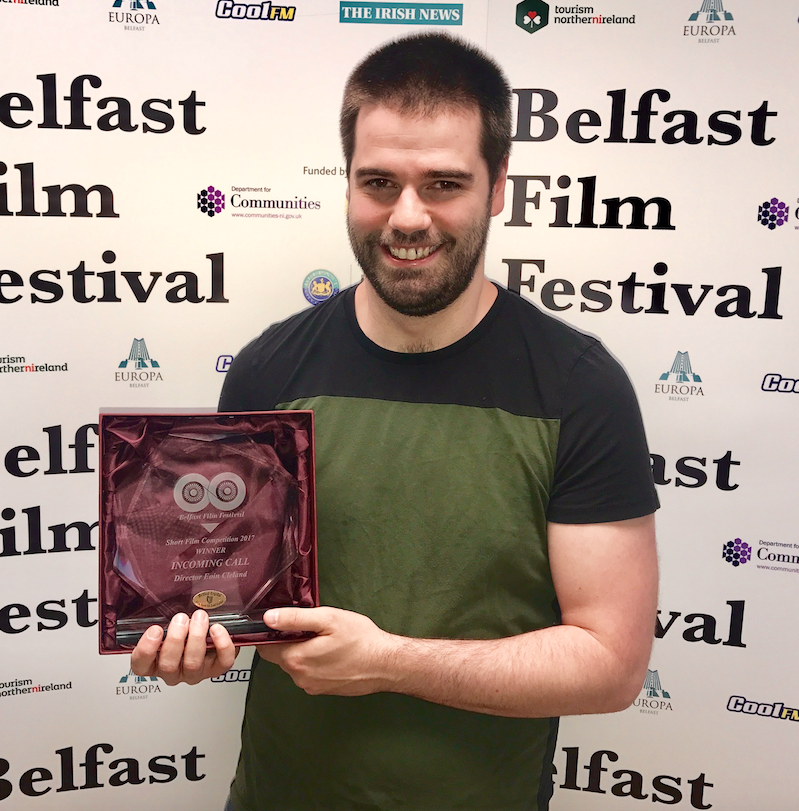
Eoin with his award for Best Short Film at the 17th Belfast Film Festival

Year	Film title	Director(s)	Country
2022	Sour Milk	Mark Keane	
2022	Still Up There	Joe Loftus	
2021	Dear Eibhlin	Laura Conlon	🇮🇪
2020	Ciúnas (Silence) (joint winner)	Tristan Heanue	🇮🇪
2020	The Shift (joint winner)	Evan Barry	🇮🇪
2019	Hold the Line	Laura O'Shea and Karen Killeen	🇮🇪
2018	Good Girls	Niamh McKeown	🇮🇪
2017	Incoming Call	Eoin Cleland	🇮🇪
2016	Introducing Brian	Nicolas Keogh	🇬🇧
2015	A Flash	Niall Cutler	🇮🇪
2014	Rúbaí	Louise Ní Fhiannachta	🇮🇪
2013	Toy Soldiers	Mike Hayes	🇮🇪
2012	Exhale	Mal Campbell	🇬🇧
2011	Even Gods	Phil Harrison	🇬🇧
2010	Chronoscope	Andrew Legge	🇮🇪
2009	Of Best Intentions	Brian Durnin	🇮🇪
2008	The Sound of People	Simon Fitzmaurice	🇮🇪
2007	The White Dress	Vanessa Gildea	🇮🇪
2006	Testing Time, Teddy Boy	Kevin McCann	🇮🇪
2005	Fluent Dysphasia	Daniel O'Hara	🇮🇪
2004	Full Circle	Simon Fitzmaurice	🇮🇪
2003	Suffering	Gary Mitchell	🇬🇧

=== Maysles Brothers Documentary Competition (part of Docs Ireland international documentary festival since 2019) ===
Year	Film title	Director(s)	Country
2022	The Balcony Movie	Pawel Łoziński	🇵🇱
2021	Writing with Fire	Sushmit Ghosh & Rintu Thomas	🇮🇳
2020	Cancelled due to pandemic		
2019	Island	Steven Eastwood	🇬🇧
2018	Still Tomorrow	Jian Fan	🇨🇳
2017	Hidden Photos	Davide Grotta	🇮🇹 🇰🇭
2016	Tchindas	Marc Serena & Pablo García Pérez de Lara	🇪🇸 🇨🇻
2015	Approaching the Elephant	Amanda Wilder	🇺🇸
2014	Sepideh - Reaching for the Stars	Berit Madsen	🇮🇷 🇩🇰 🇩🇪 🇳🇴 🇸🇪
2013	Bad Boy High Security Cell	Janusz Mrozowski	🇵🇱 🇫🇷
2012	The Tiniest Place (El lugar más pequeño)	Tatiana Huezo Sánchez	🇲🇽
2011	Marwencol	Jeff Malmberg	🇺🇸
2010	October Country	Michael Palmieri & Donal Mosher	🇺🇸
2009	Presumed Guilty	Roberto Hernández	🇲🇽
2008	End of the Rainbow	Robert Nugent	🇫🇷 🇦🇺
2007	Nömadak Tx	Raúl de la Fuente	🇪🇸

=== Audience Award ===
Year	Film title	Director(s)	Country
2019	Heavy Trip	Jukka Vidgren and Juuso Laatio	🇫🇮
2018	The Divine Order	Petra Biondina Volpe	🇨🇭
2017	A Man Called Ove (En man som heter Ove)	Hannes Holm	🇸🇪
2016	Traders	Rachael Moriarty & Peter Murphy	🇮🇪
2015	Timbuktu	Abderrahmane Sissako	🇲🇷 🇫🇷
2014	The Lunchbox (Dabba)	Ritesh Batra	🇮🇳 🇫🇷 🇩🇪 🇺🇸 🇨🇦
2013	Much Ado About Nothing	Joss Whedon	🇺🇸
2012	Good Vibrations	Lisa Barros D'Sa & Glenn Leyburn	🇬🇧 🇮🇪
2011	Simple Simon (I rymden finns inga känslor)	Andrea Ohman	🇸🇪
2010	Cup Cake	Colin McIvor	🇬🇧
2009	Cherrybomb	Lisa Barros D'Sa & Glenn Leyburn	🇬🇧

=== Short Documentary Competition (part of Docs Ireland international documentary festival since 2019) ===
Year	Film title	Director(s)	Country
2022	Ireland's Last Matchmaker (joint winner)	Sam Howard	
2022	Mam's Old Chair (joint winner)	Sheena Walsh	
2021	How to Fall in Love in a Pandemic	Michael-David McKernan	
2020	Hydebank	Ross McClean	🇮🇪
2019	Strong at the Broken Places	Anna Rodgers	🇮🇪
2017	Raymond	David Stephenson	🇮🇪
2017	Martin	Donal Moloney	🇮🇪

=== Réalta Award for Outstanding Contribution to Cinema ===
Year	Name	Role(s)
2025	Lucy Liu	Actress
2023	John Sayles & Maggie Renzi	Director/Producer
2021	Bríd Brennan	Actress
2019	Robert Carlyle	Actor
2018	Ken Loach	Director
2017	John Cusack	Actor
2016	Terence Davies	Writer/Director
2010	Ciarán Hinds	Actor

=== Lifetime Achievement Award ===
Year	Name	Role(s)
2021	Roy and Noel Spence	Filmmakers
2014	James Ellis	Actor
2010	Haskell Wexler	Cinematographer

== See also ==
- Féile an Phobail
- Cathedral Quarter Arts Festival
- Queen's Film Theatre
- Belfast Festival at Queen's
