= Architecture of Belfast =

The architecture of Belfast comprises architectural styles ranging from Georgian through to modernist buildings such as the Waterfront Hall and Titanic Belfast. The city's Victorian and Edwardian buildings are notable for their display of a large number of sculptures. Many of Belfast's Victorian era landmarks, including the main Lanyon Building at Queens University, were designed by Sir Charles Lanyon.

== Chronology and styles ==
Belfast became a substantial settlement in the 17th century, after being established as a town by Sir Arthur Chichester. None of the buildings from Belfast's first century as a market town on the river Farset survive today. The only significant structures in those early years from 1613 would have been a castle established by Sir Arthur Chichester, and the parish church at the foot of High Street, where a 'chapel of the ford' had been erected by 1306, and where St George's church now stands.

=== Georgian ===
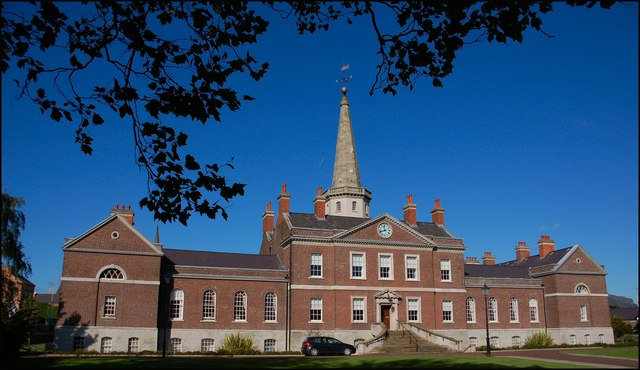
Clifton House
(1771–1774; Grade A)

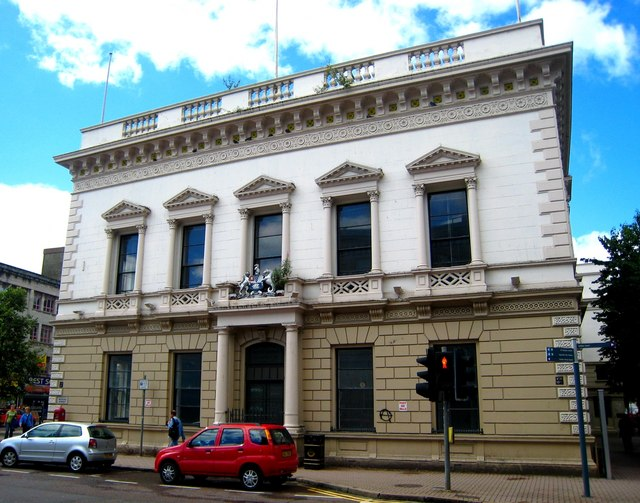
The Exchange and Assembly Rooms
(1769)
Remodeled in 1845

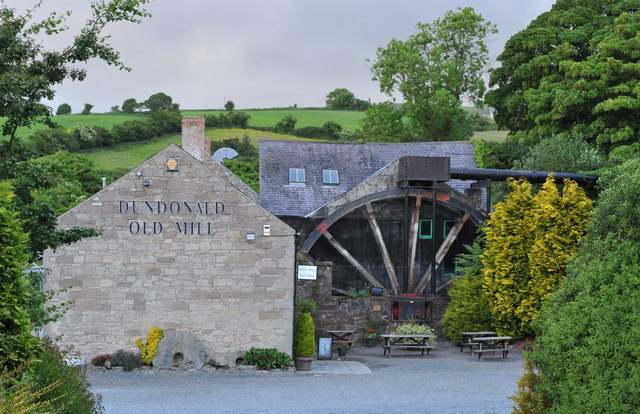
Dundonald Old Mill (1752; Grade B1)

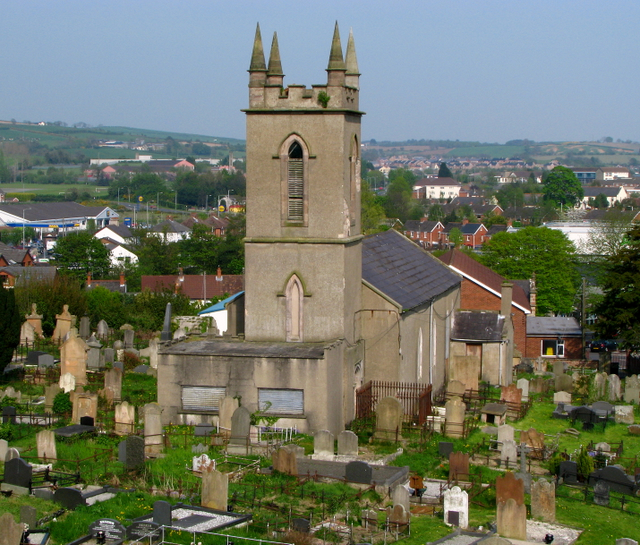
St Elizabeth's Old Church (1771; incorporates 1624 tower; Grade B+)

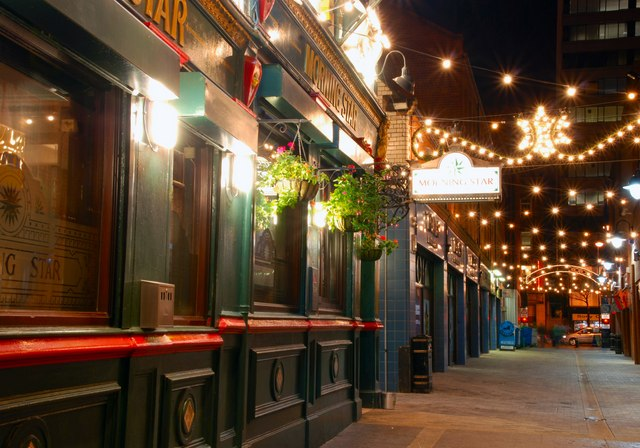
The Morning Star (1810; Grade B1)

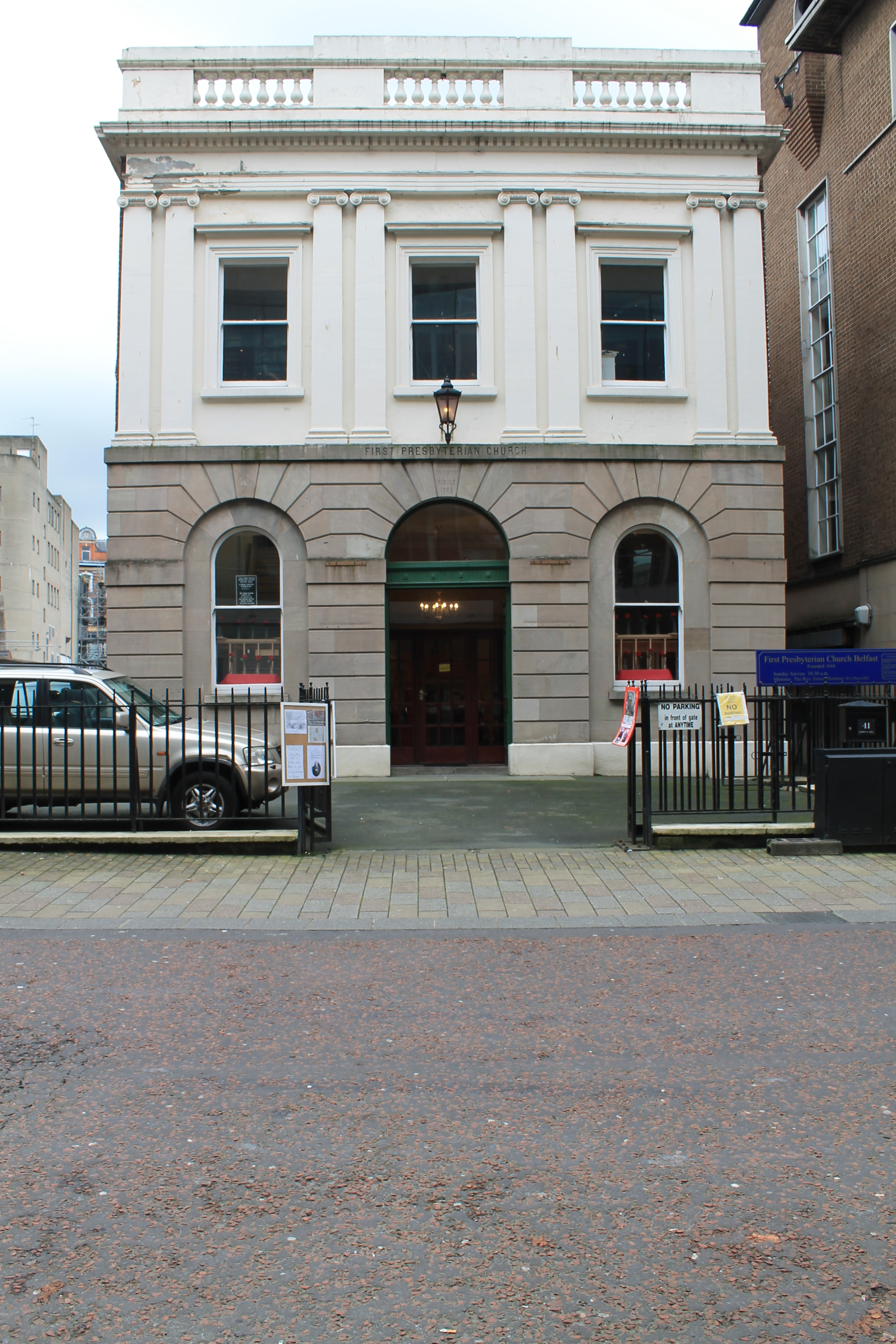
First Presbyterian Church (1781–1783; Grade A)

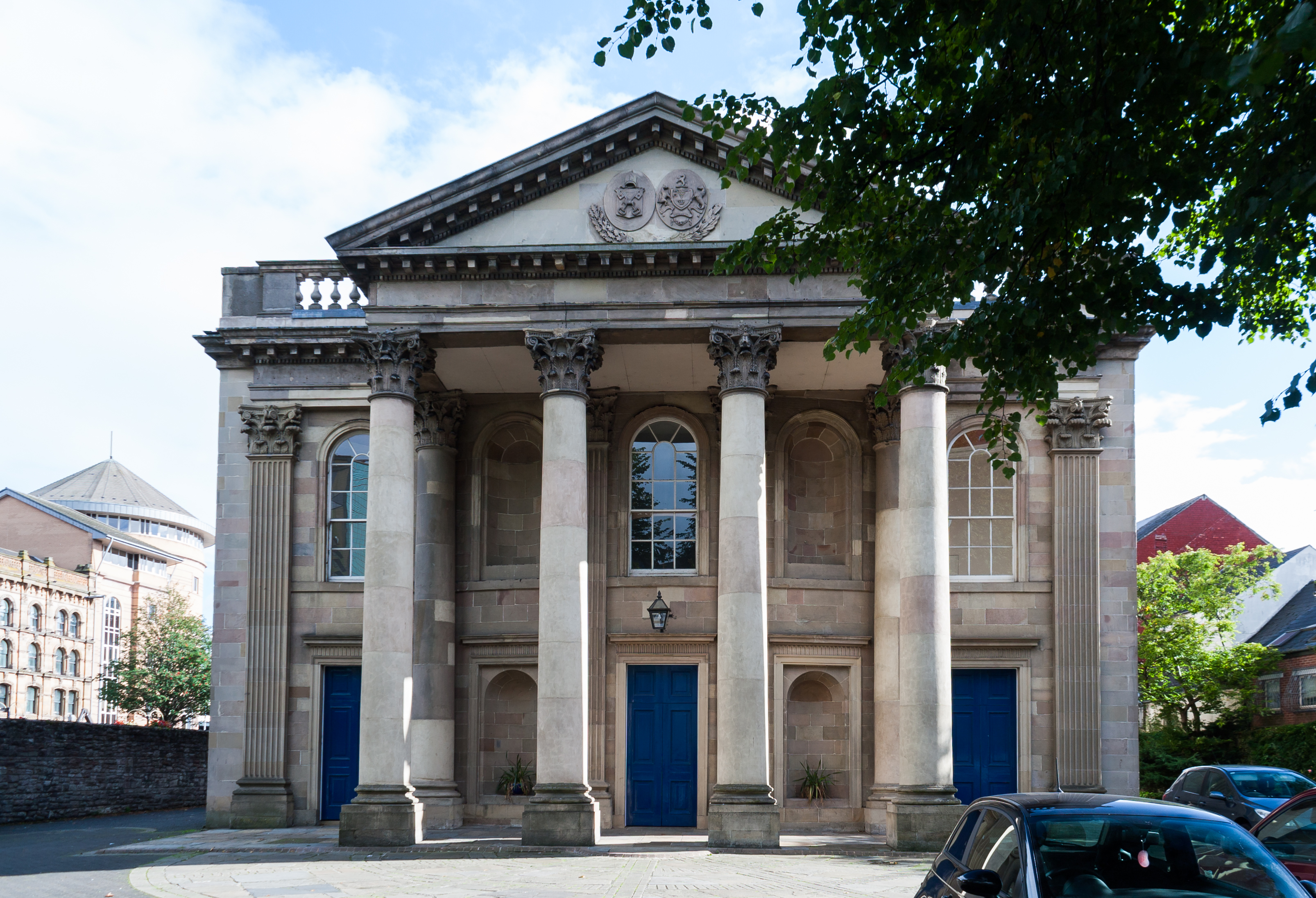
St. George’s Church (1811–1816; Grade A)

=== Victorian ===
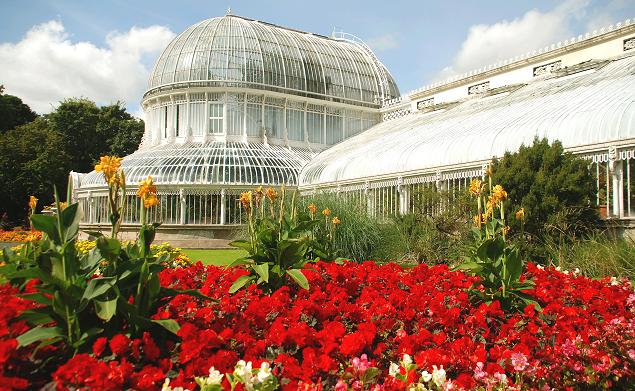
Botanic Gardens Palm House
(1839–1840)

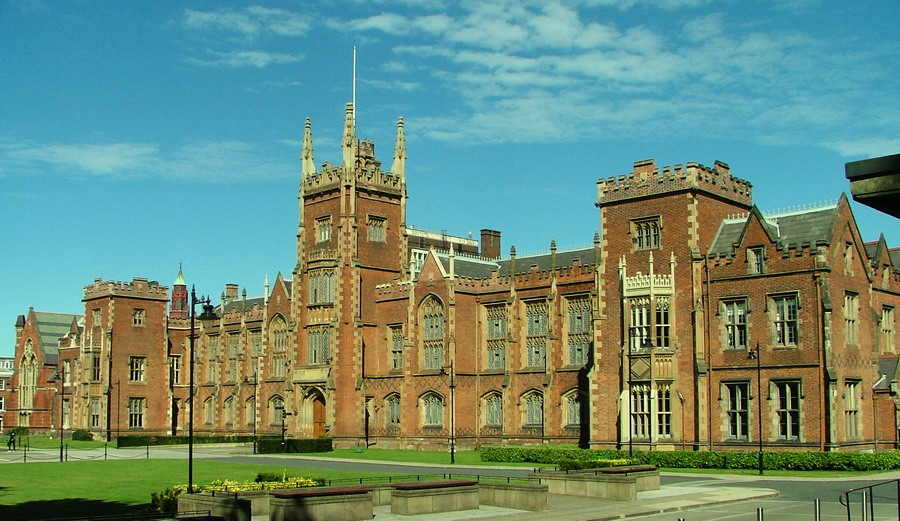
Lanyon Building
(1849)

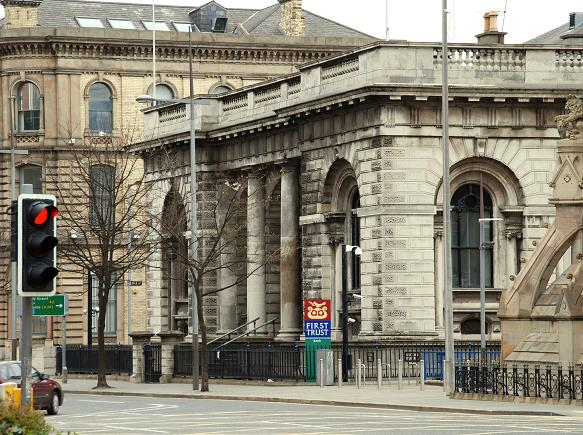
16 Victoria Street
(1852; Grade B)

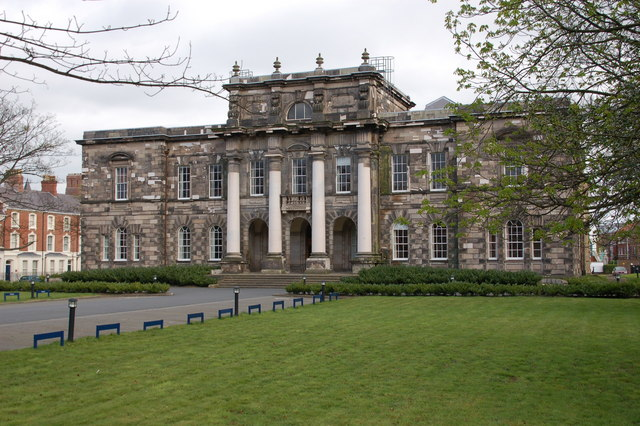
Union Theological College
(1853; Grade A)

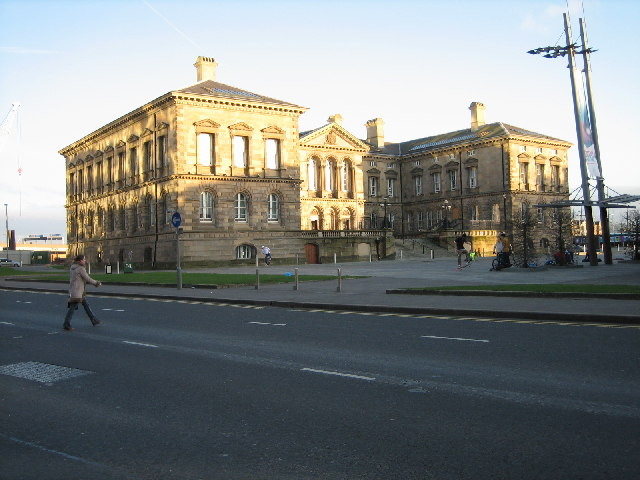
The Custom House
(1856)

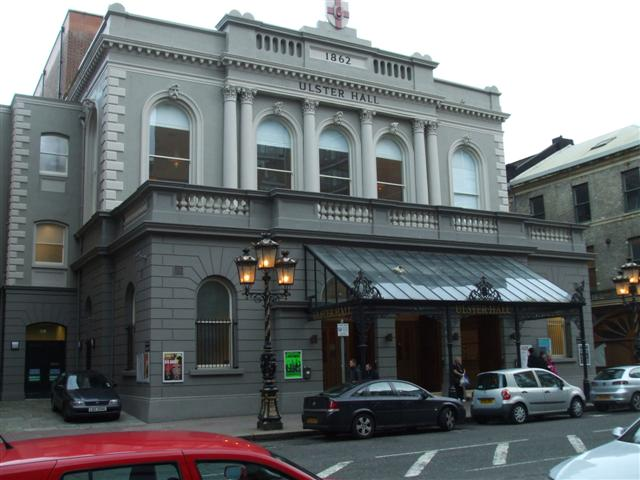
Ulster Hall
(1859–1862; Grade B1)
Renovated 2009

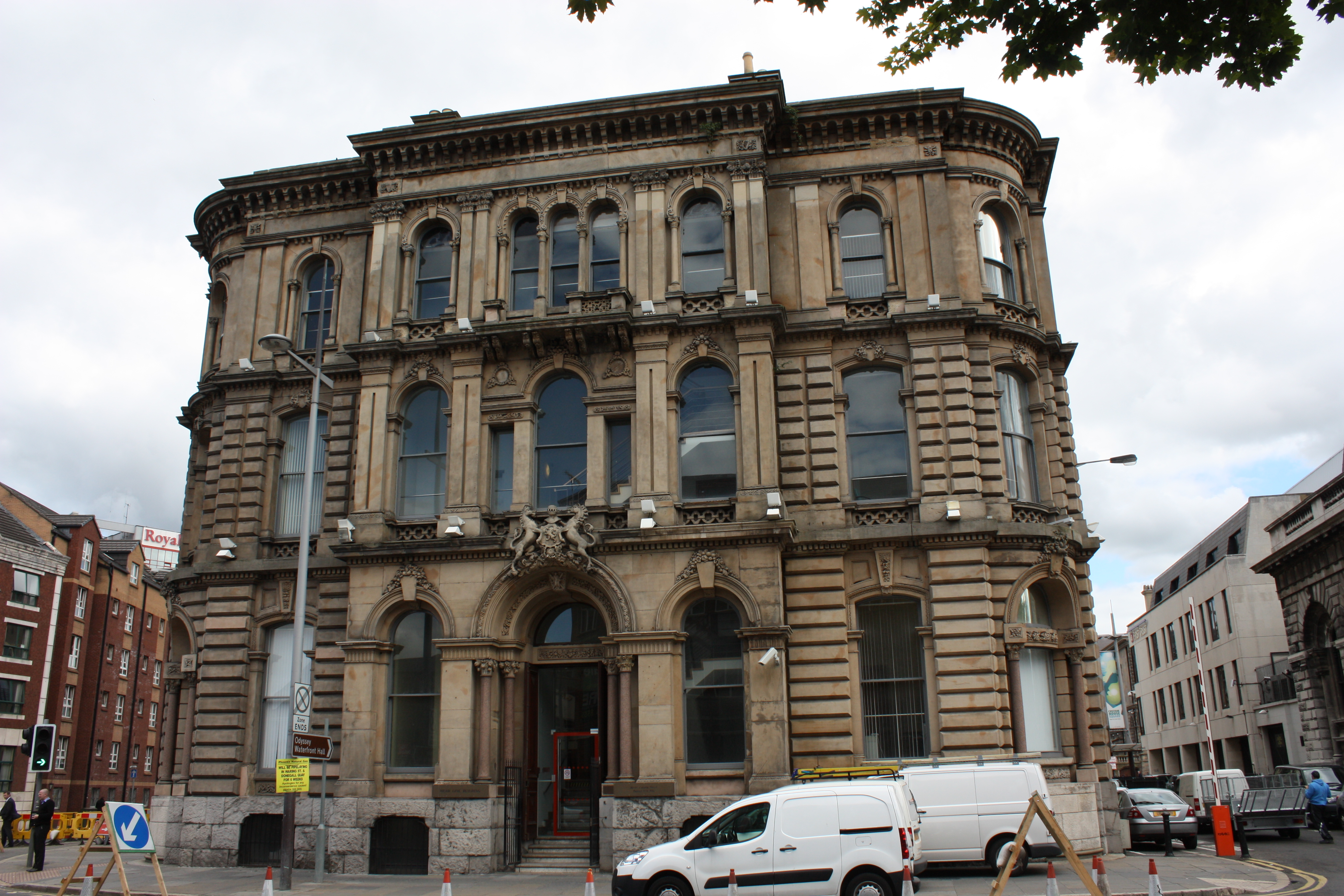
The Headline Building
(1863)

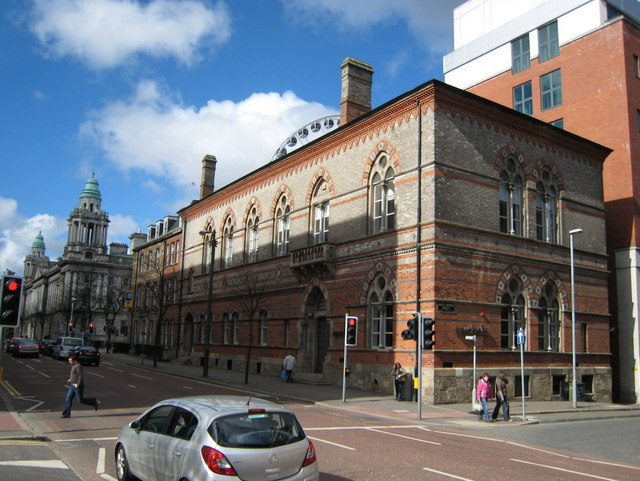
Clarence House
(1867)

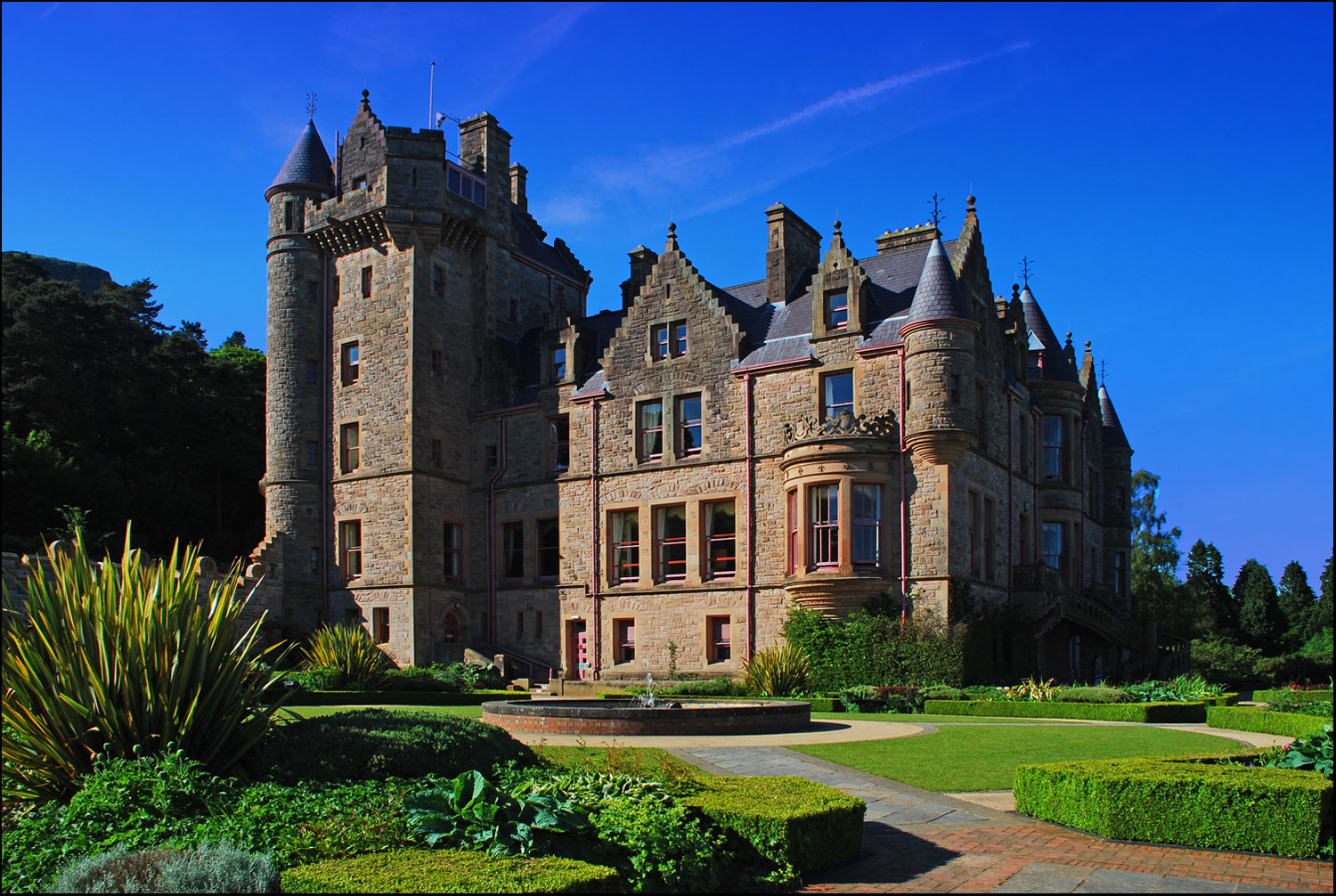
Belfast Castle
(1811–1870; Grade B+)

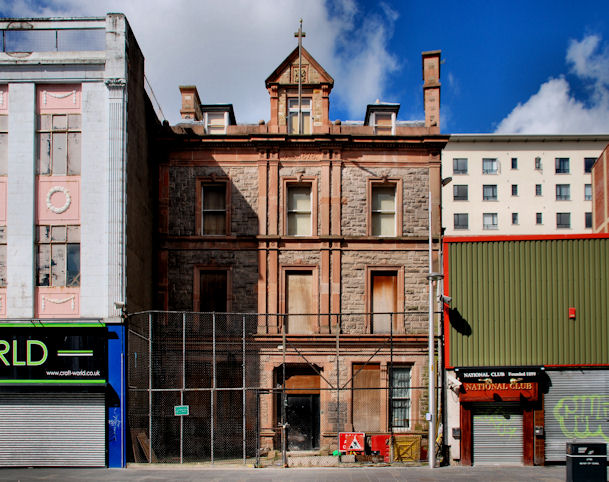
Queen Street Children's Hospital (1878)

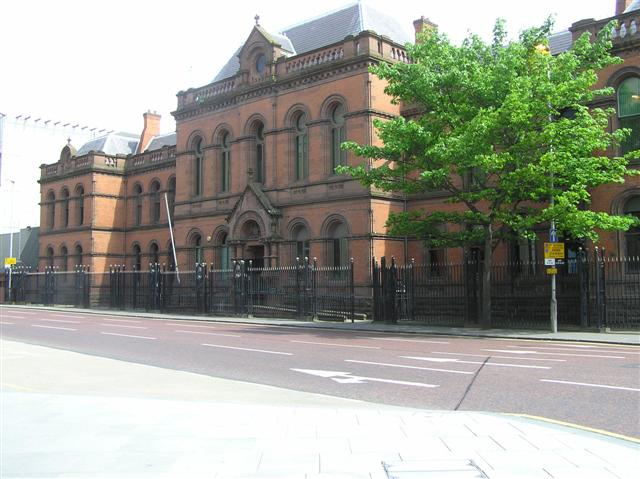
The Old Town Hall
(1860–1879; Grade B1)

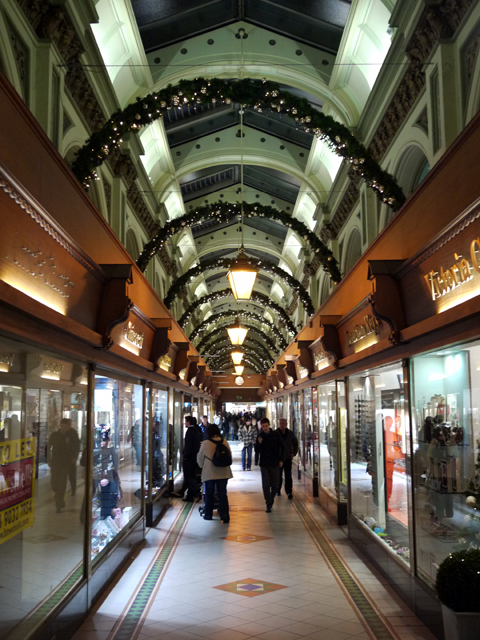
Queen's Arcade
(1879–1880; Grade B1)
Renovated 1987, 1994

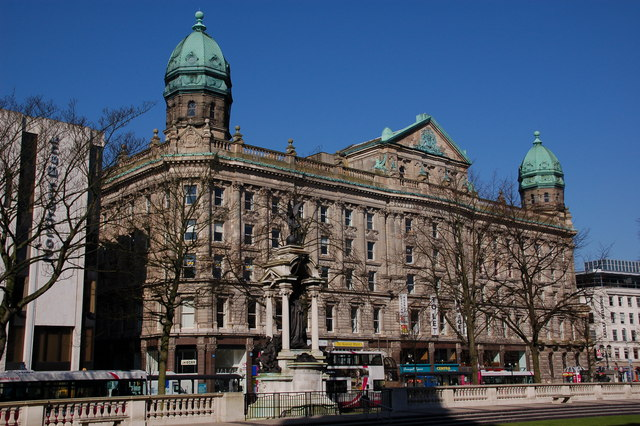
The Scottish Provident Institution
(1899–1902; Grade A)

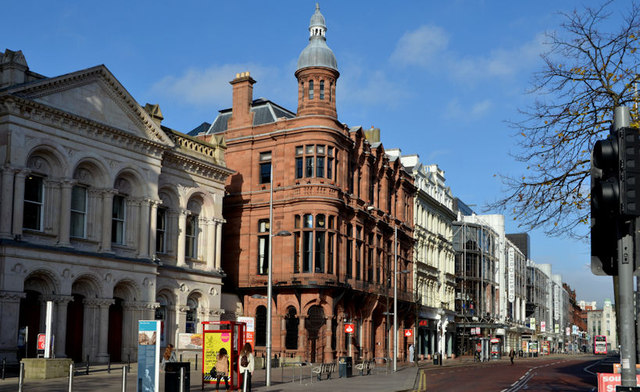
Ulster Reform Club (1883–1885; Grade A)

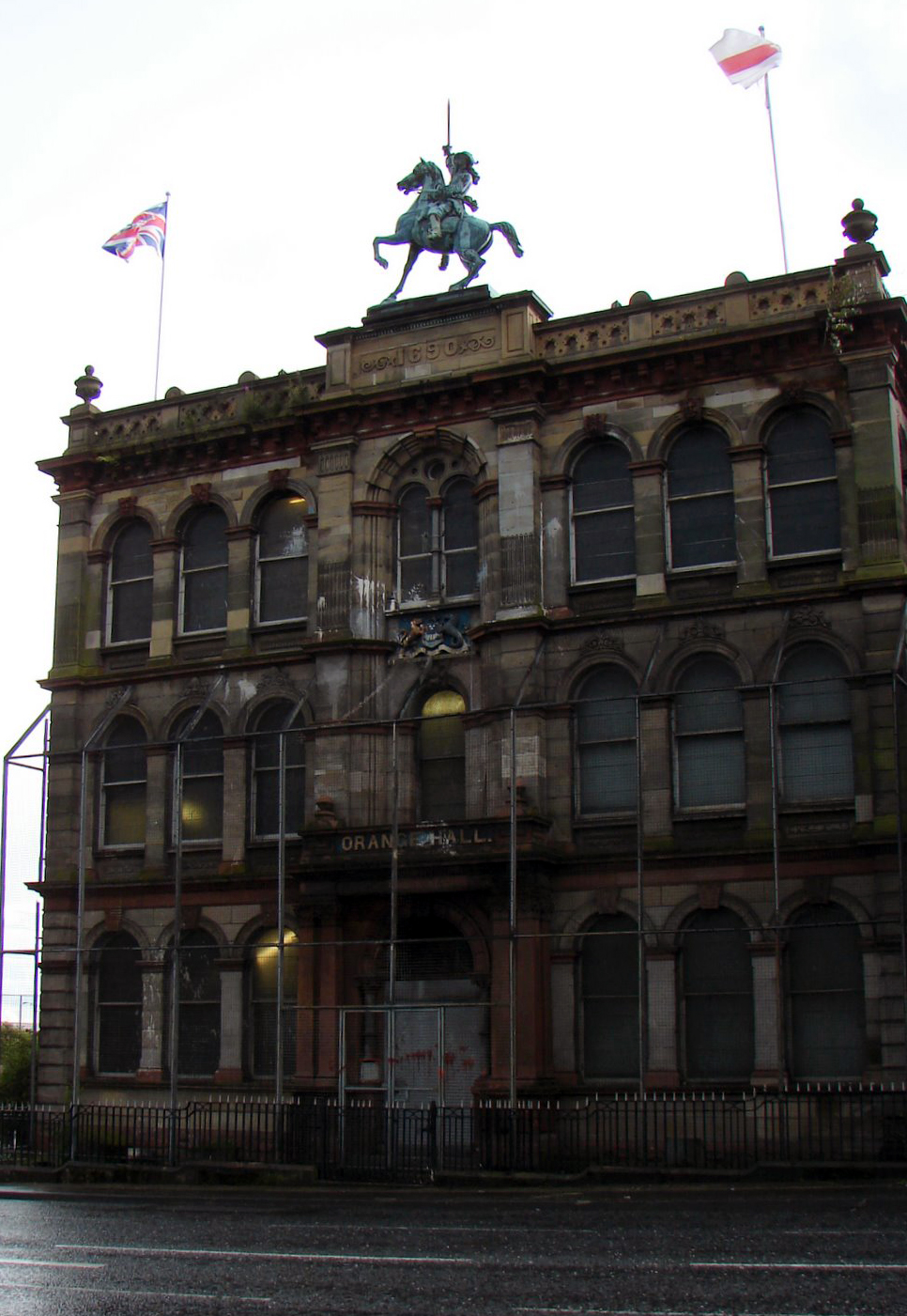
Belfast Orange Hall, Clifton Street (1883–1885; Grade B1)

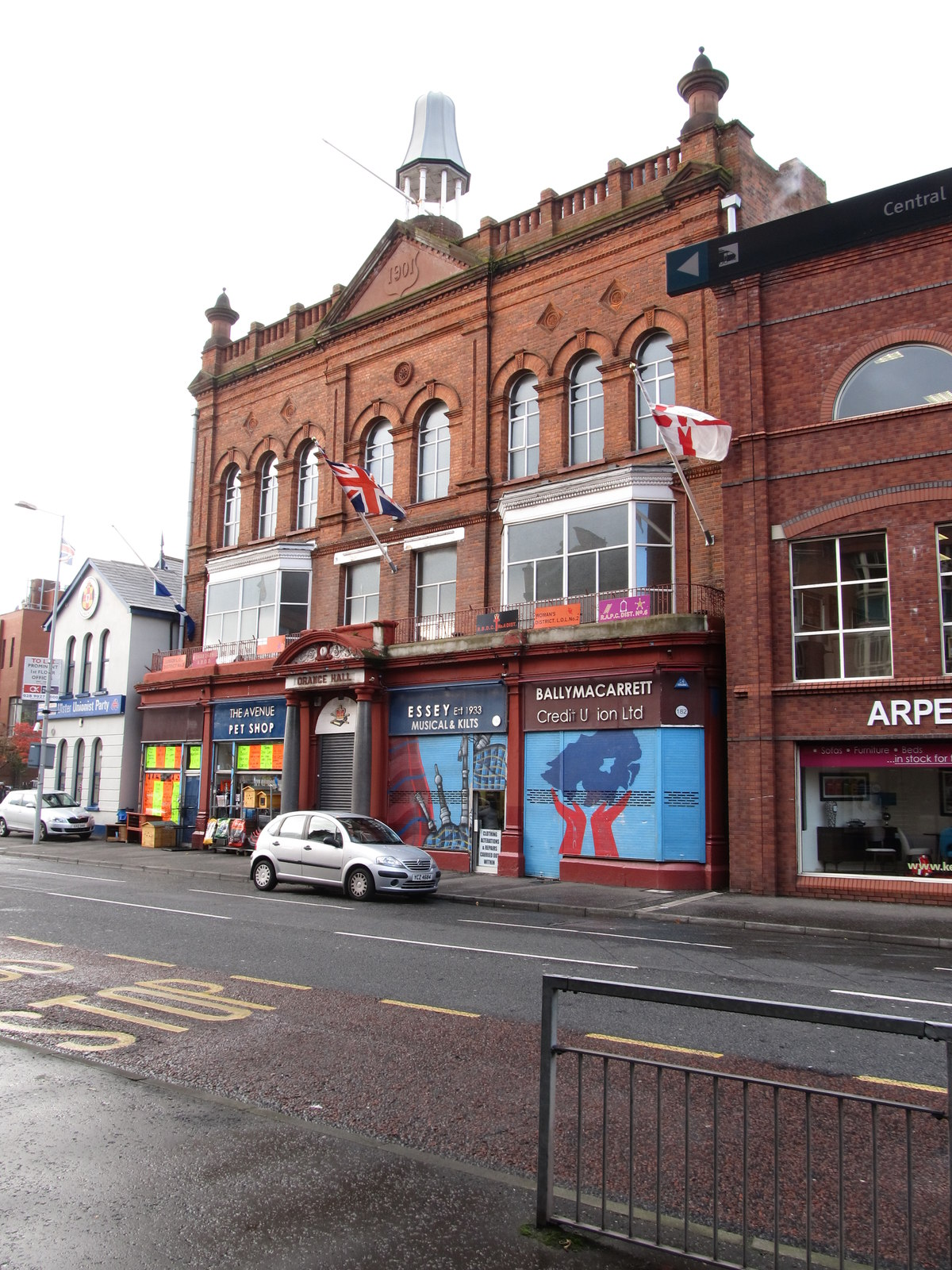
Ballymacarret Orange Hall (1890–1892; Grade B1)

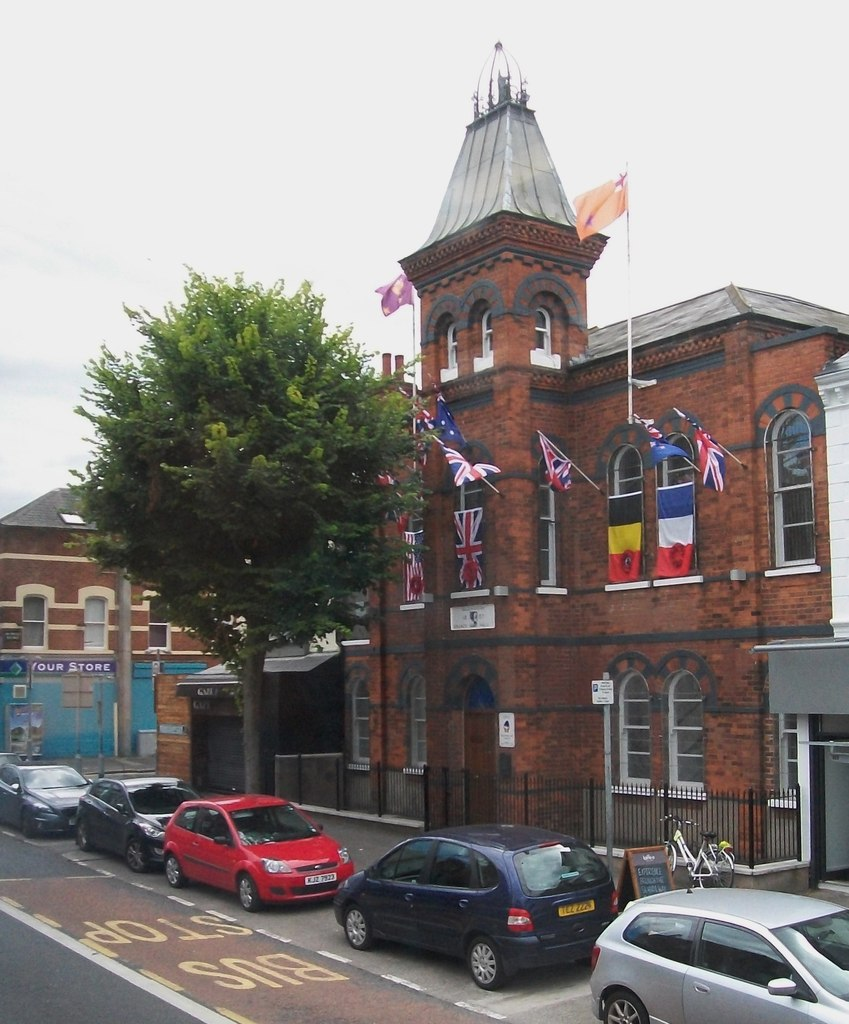
Ballynafeigh Orange Hall (1887–1889; Grade B2)

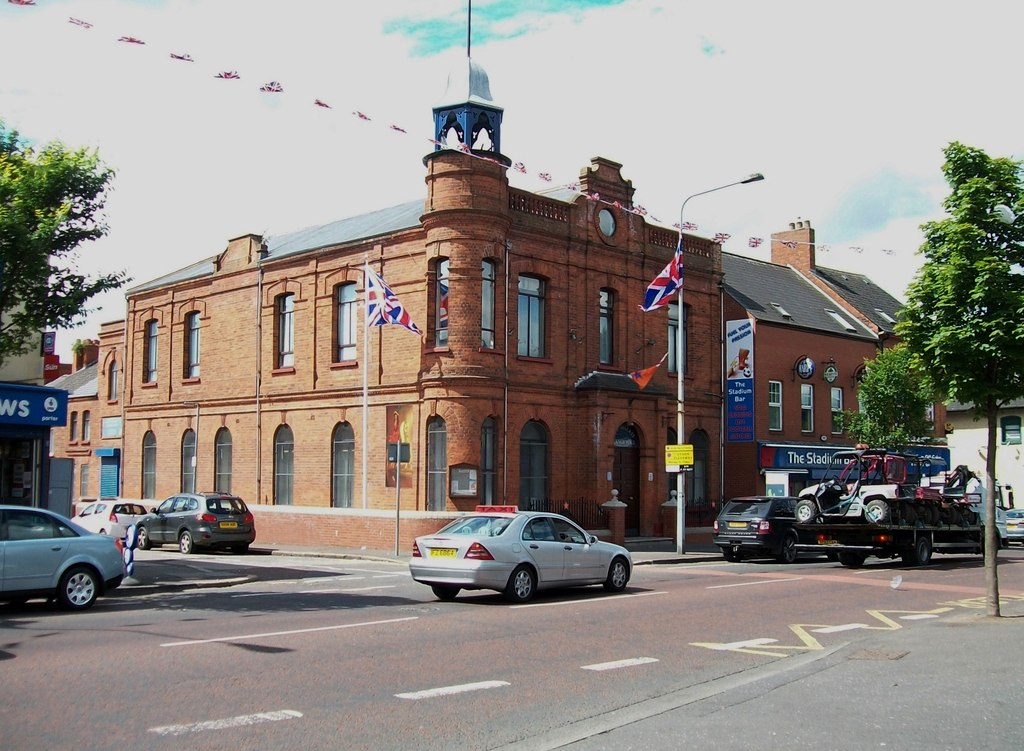
Shankill Road Orange Hall (1898–1899; Grade B1)

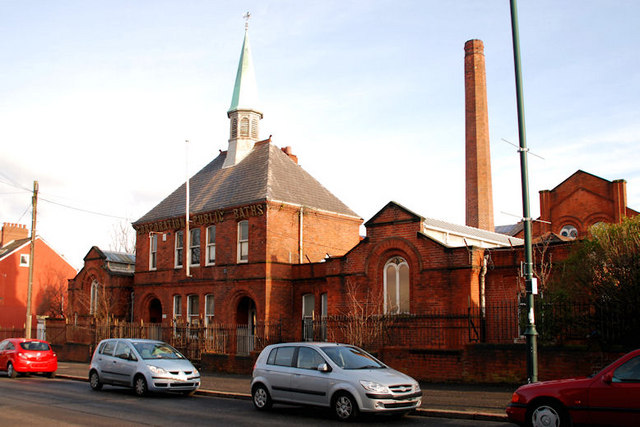
Templemore Public Baths (1891–1893; Grade B1)

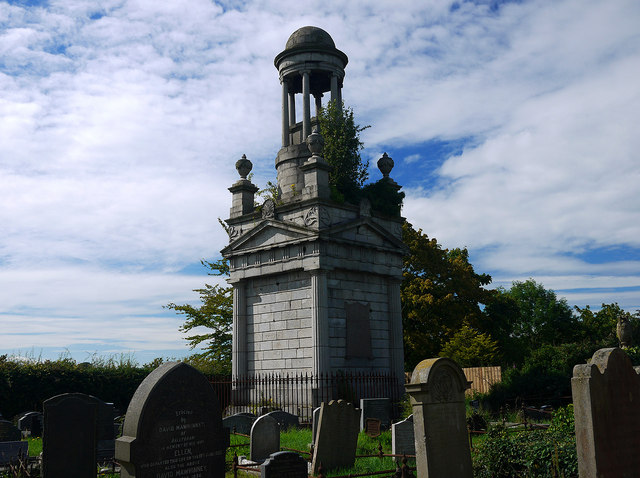
Cleland Mausoleum (1842; Grade B+)

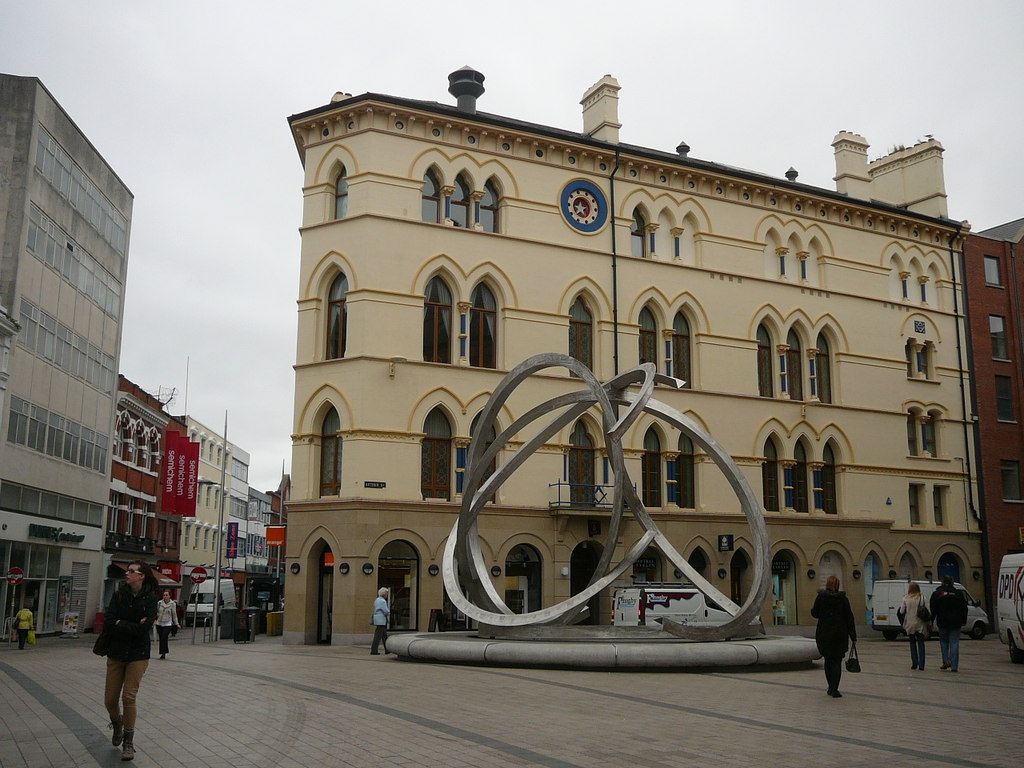
Freemasons' Hall, Arthur Square (1868–1870; Grade B1)

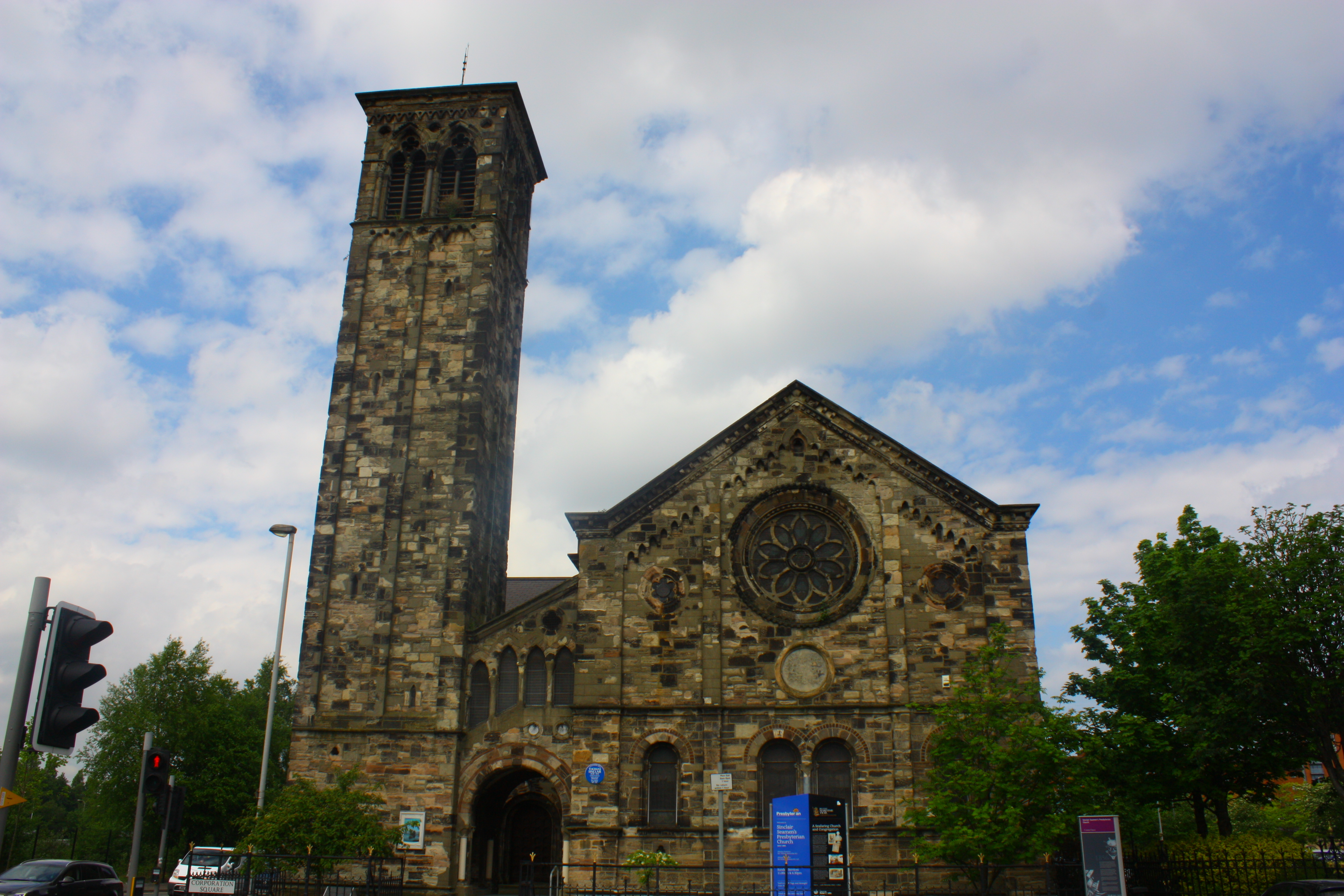
Sinclair Seamen's Presbyterian Church (1856–1857; Grade A)

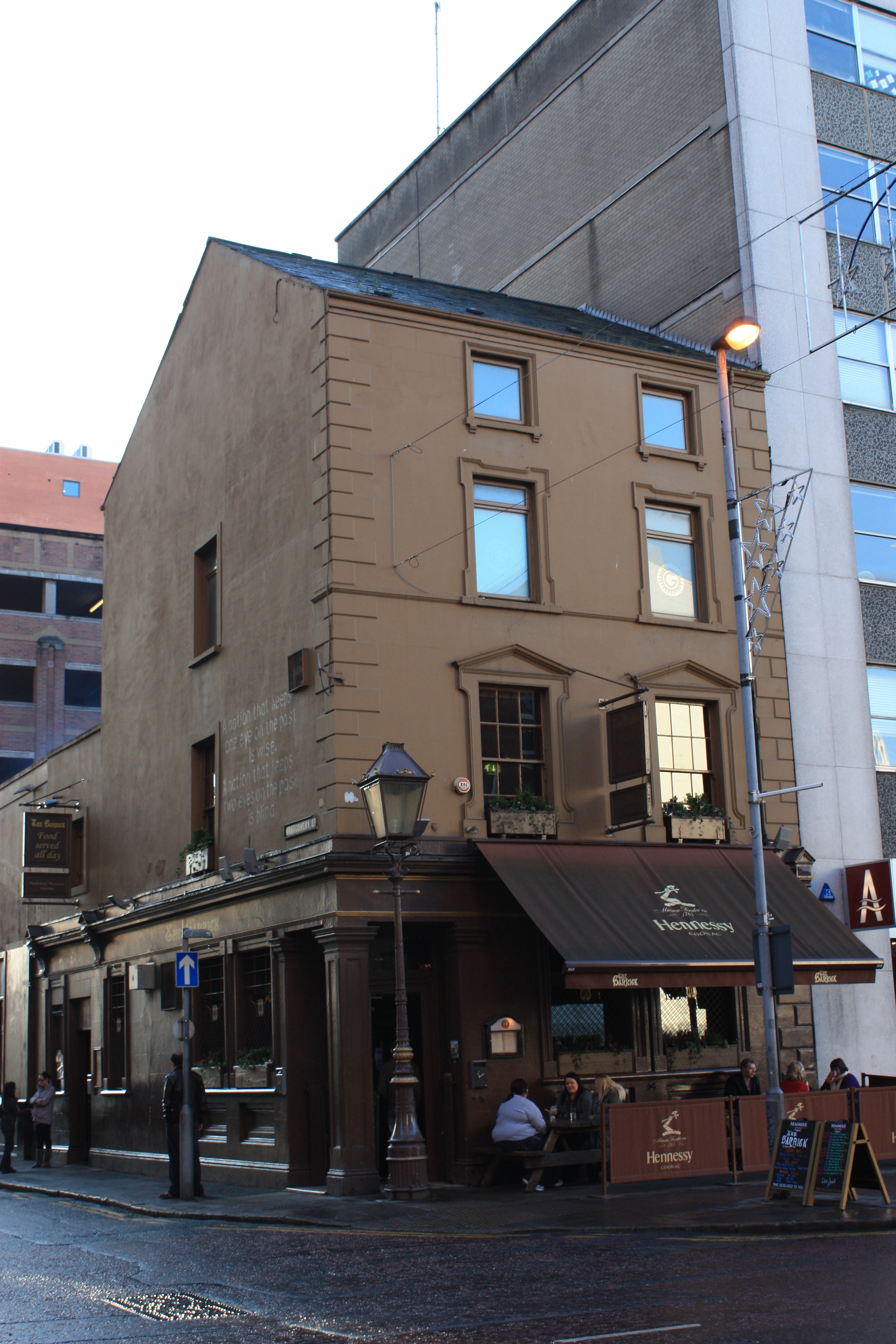
Garrick Bar (1870; Grade B1)

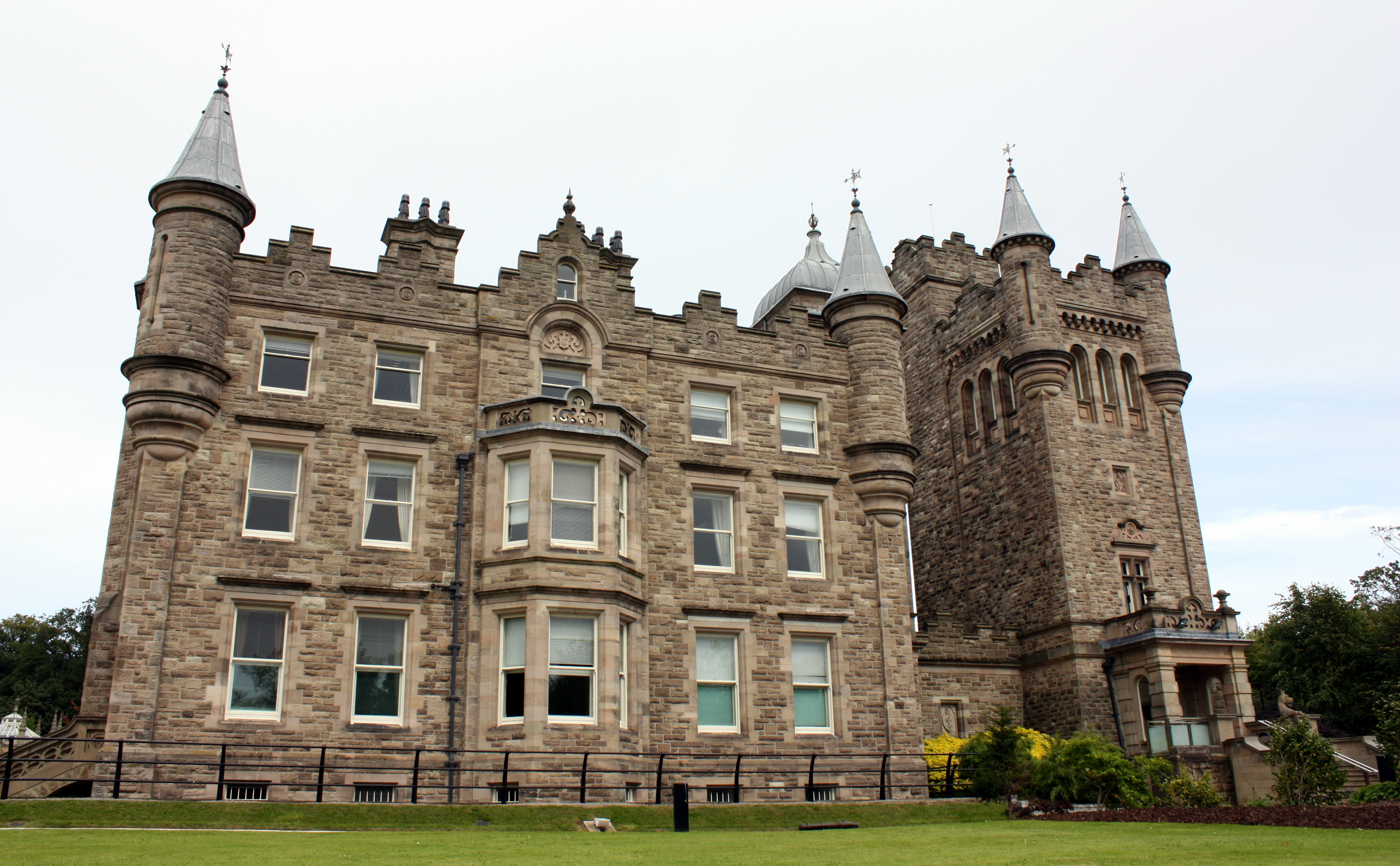
Stormont Castle (1830–1858; Grade A)

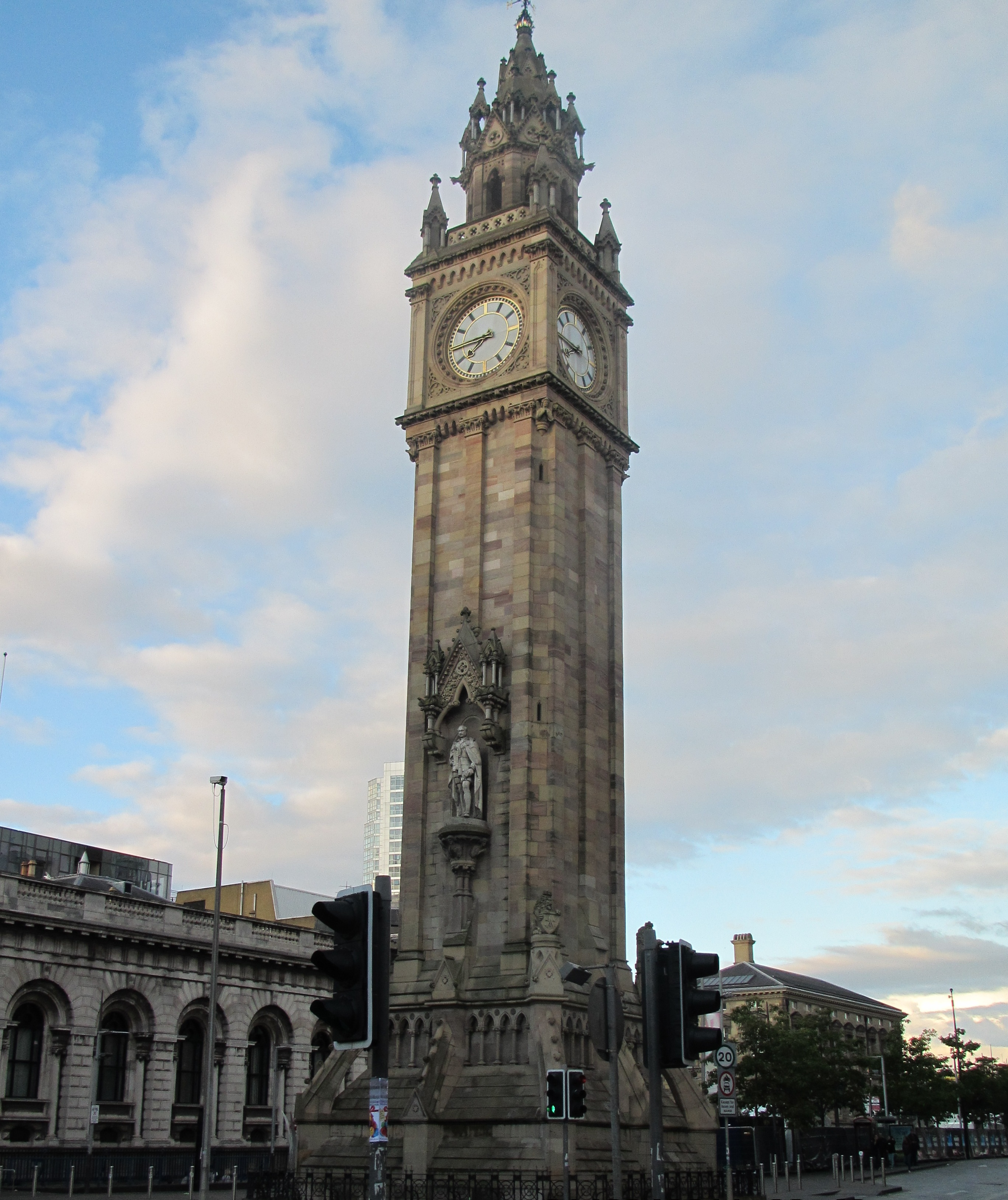
Albert Memorial Clock (1865–1869; Grade A)

=== 20th century ===
==== Edwardian ====
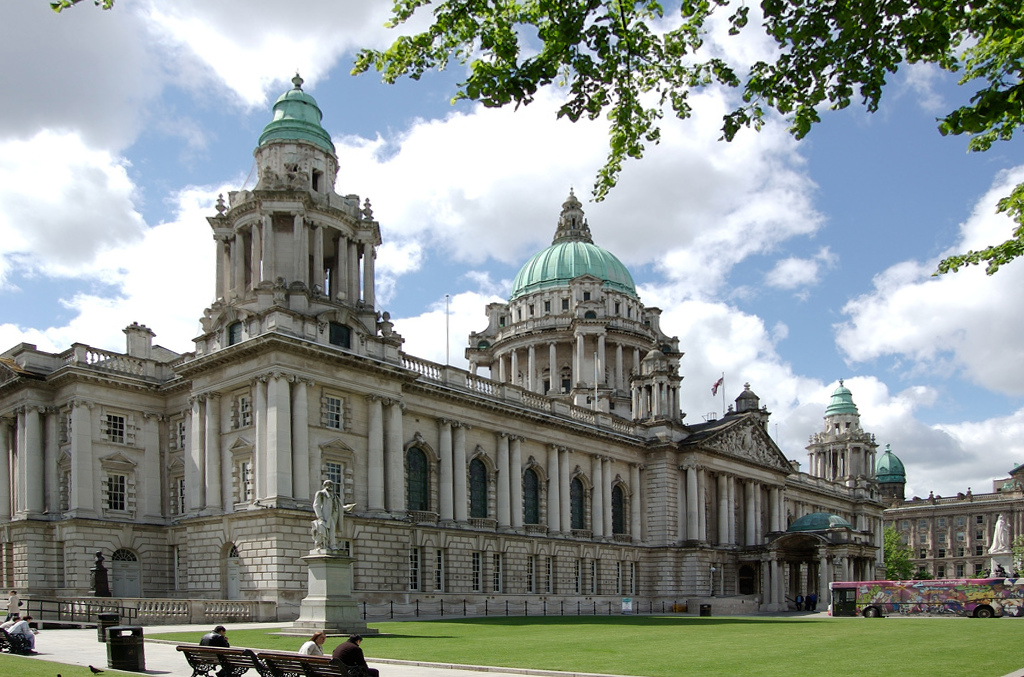
Belfast City Hall
(1898–1906; Grade A)

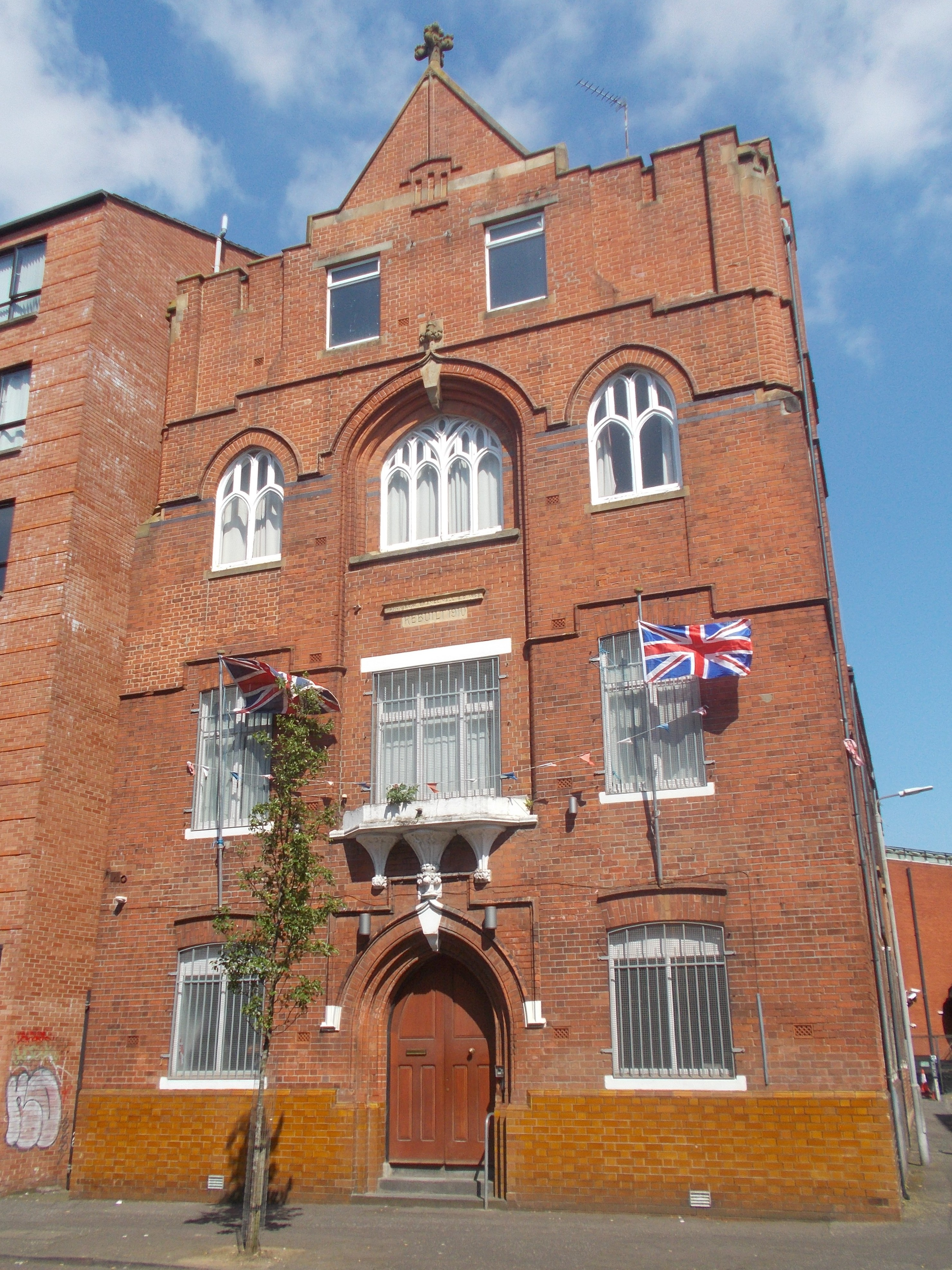
Sandy Row Orange Hall (1908–1910; Grade B1)

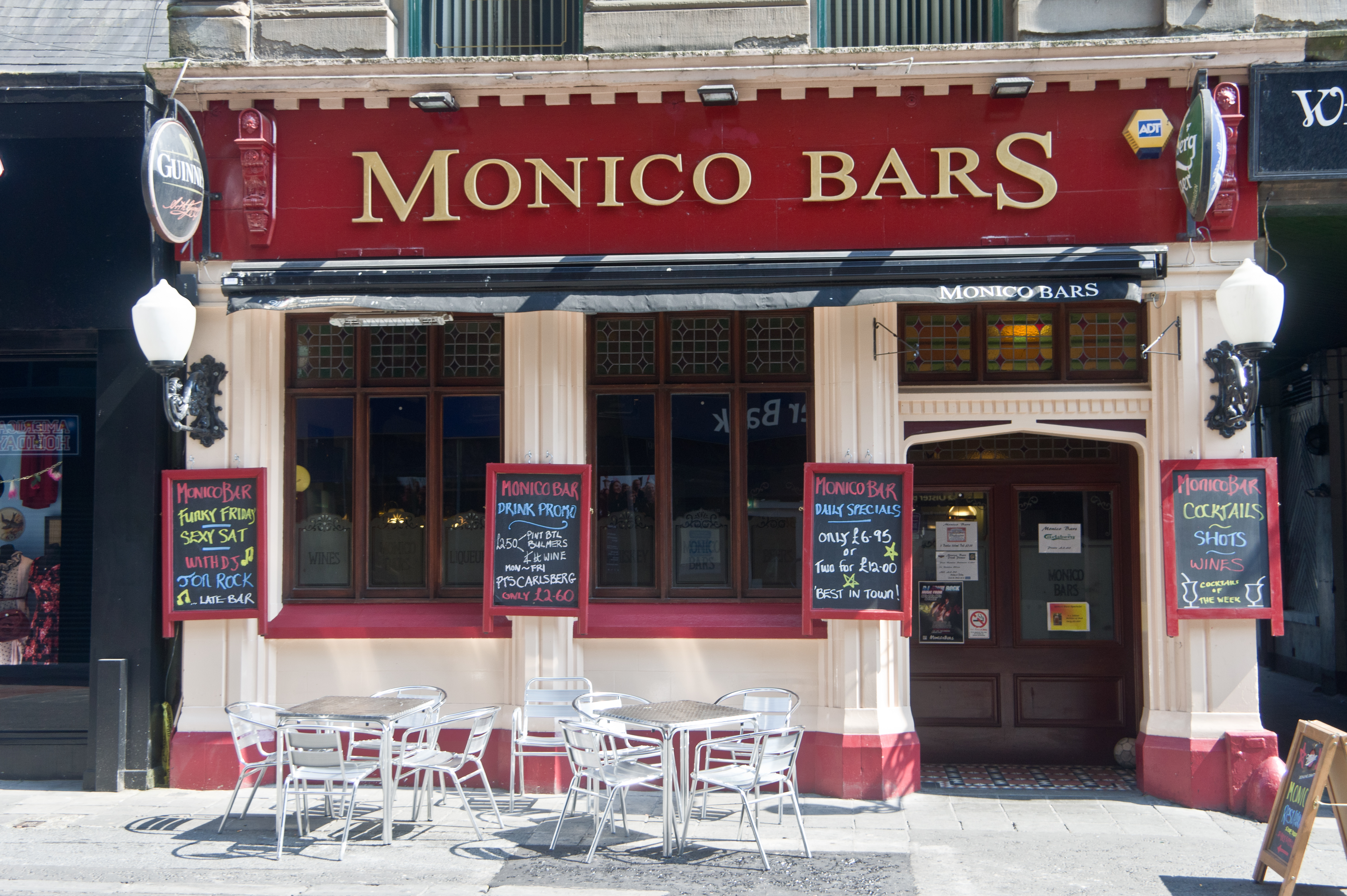
Monico Bars (1900–1910; Grade B1)

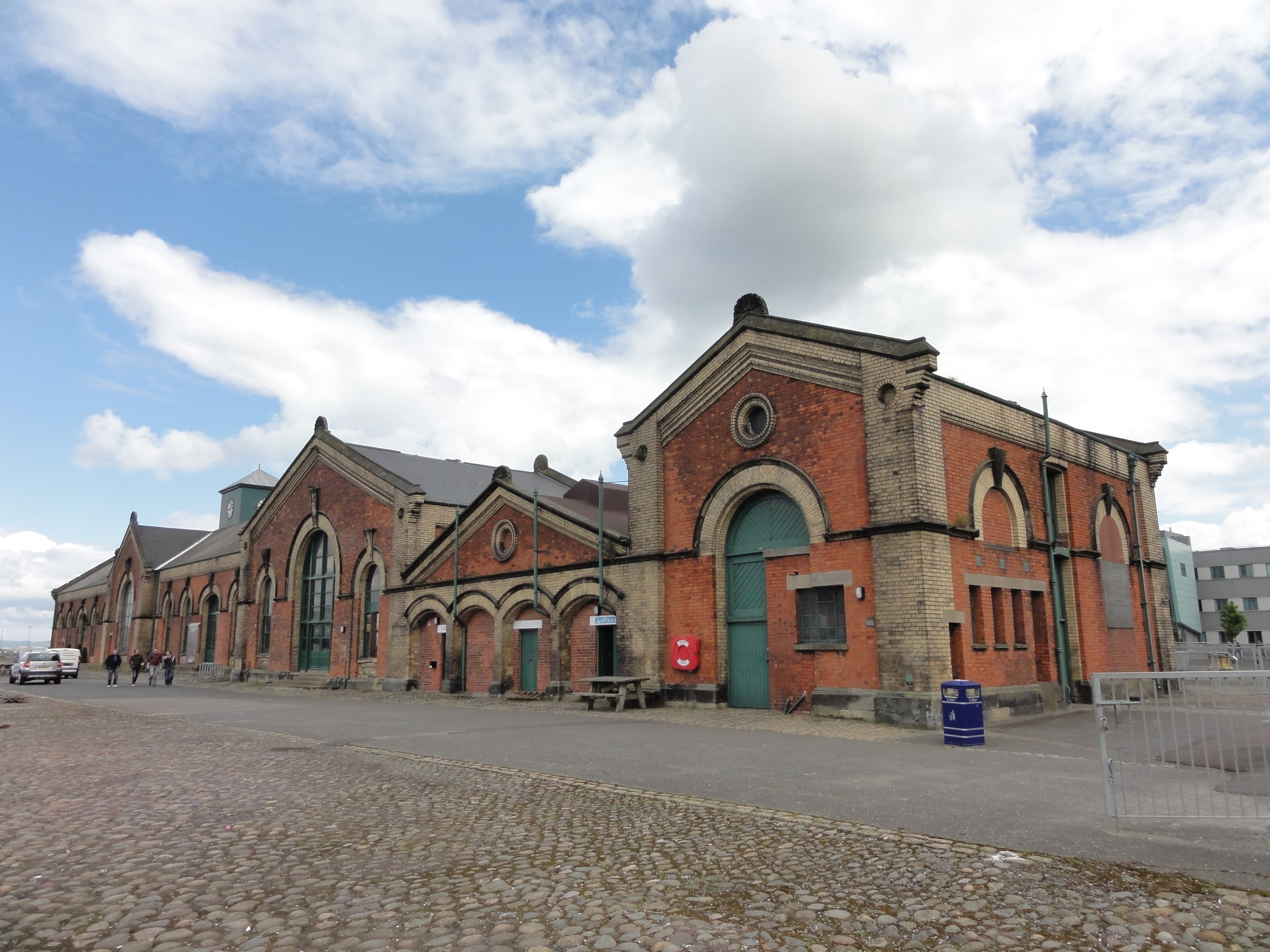
Titanic Dock and Pump House (1904–1911; Grade A)

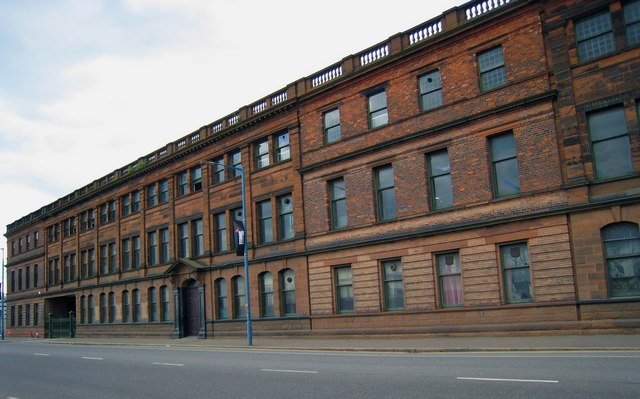
Harland & Wolff Headquarters Building Drawing Offices (1889–1917; Grade B+)

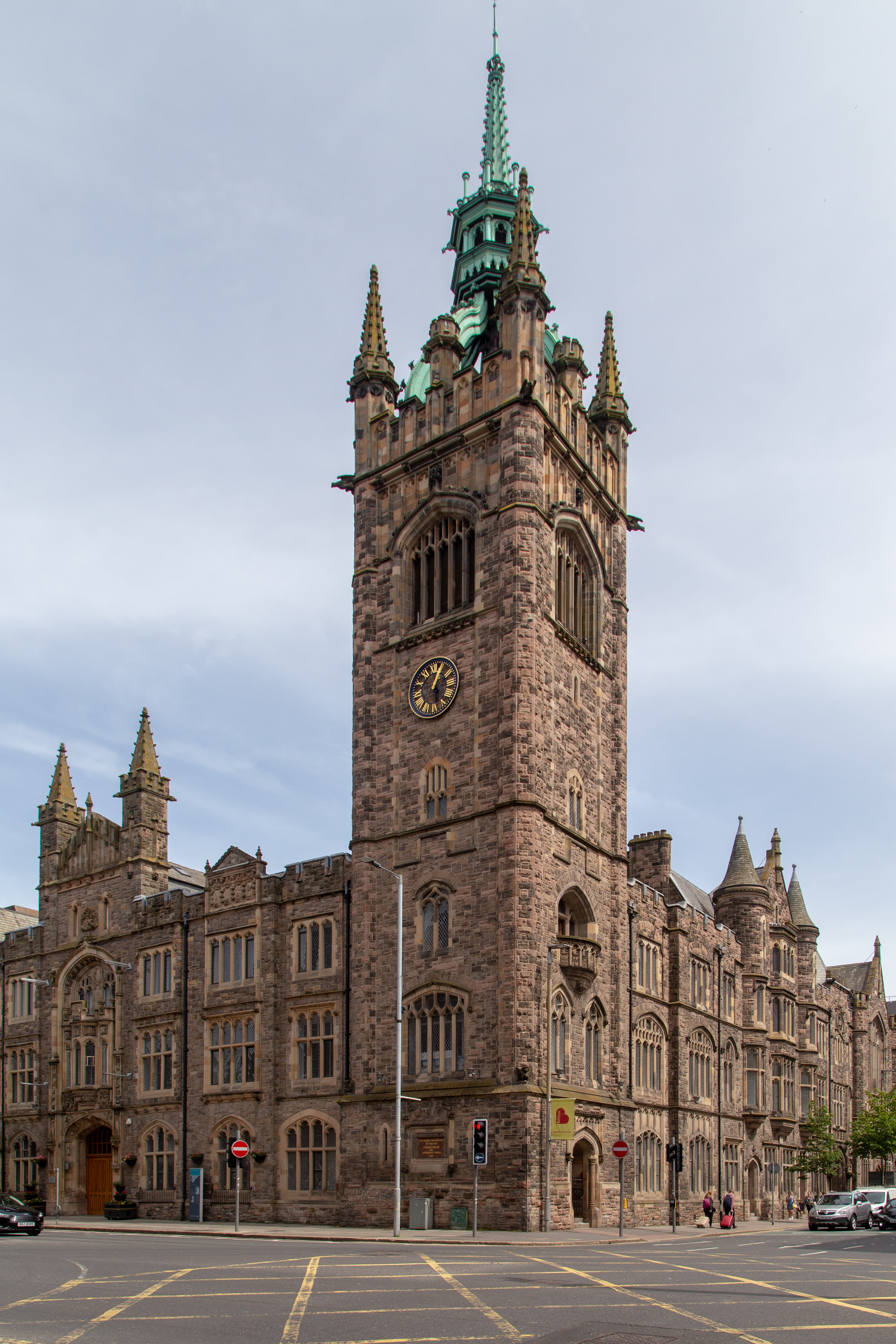
Assembly Buildings (1905; Grade B+)

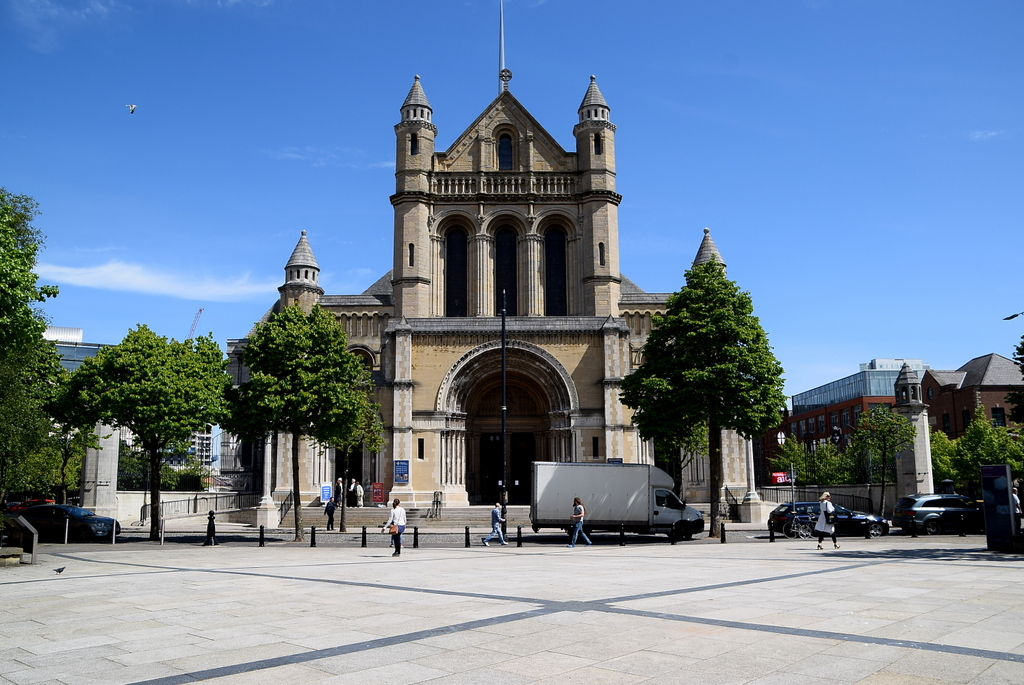
St. Anne's Cathedral (1899–1904; Grade A)

==== Pre-World War II and Art Deco ====
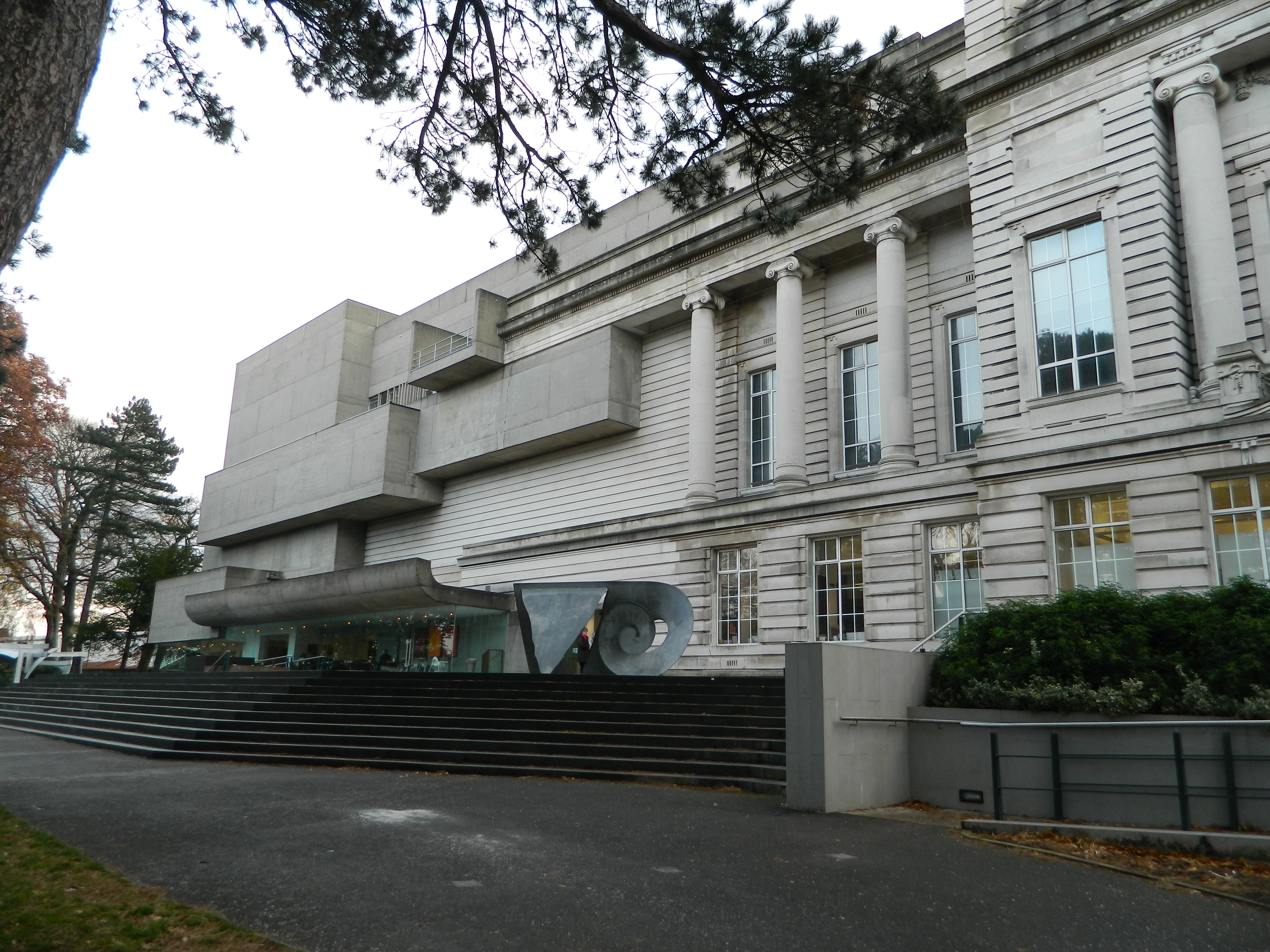
Ulster Museum
(1929; extended 1962; Grade B1)

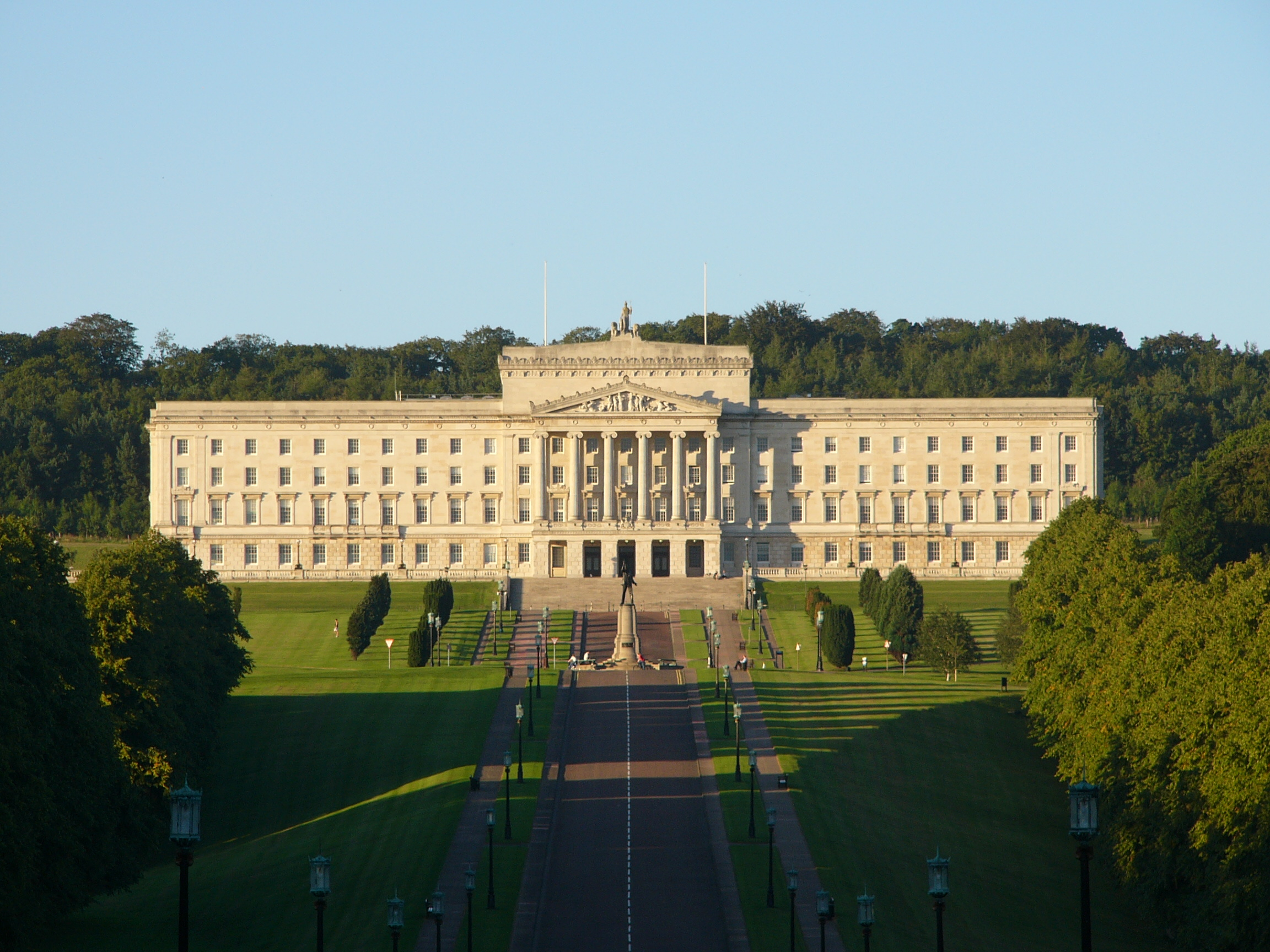
Parliament Buildings
(1922–1932; Grade A)

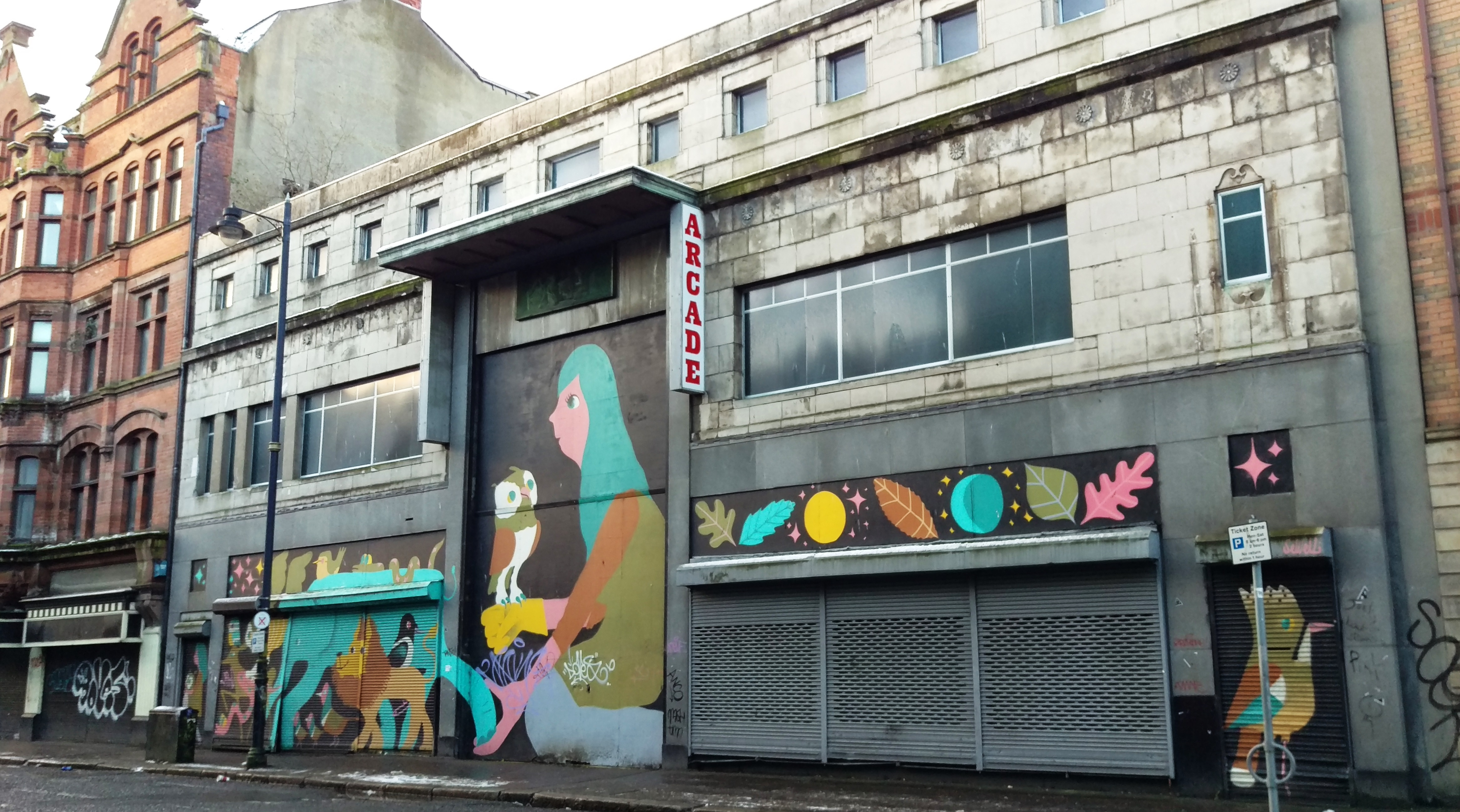
North Street Arcade
(1936–1938; Grade B1)

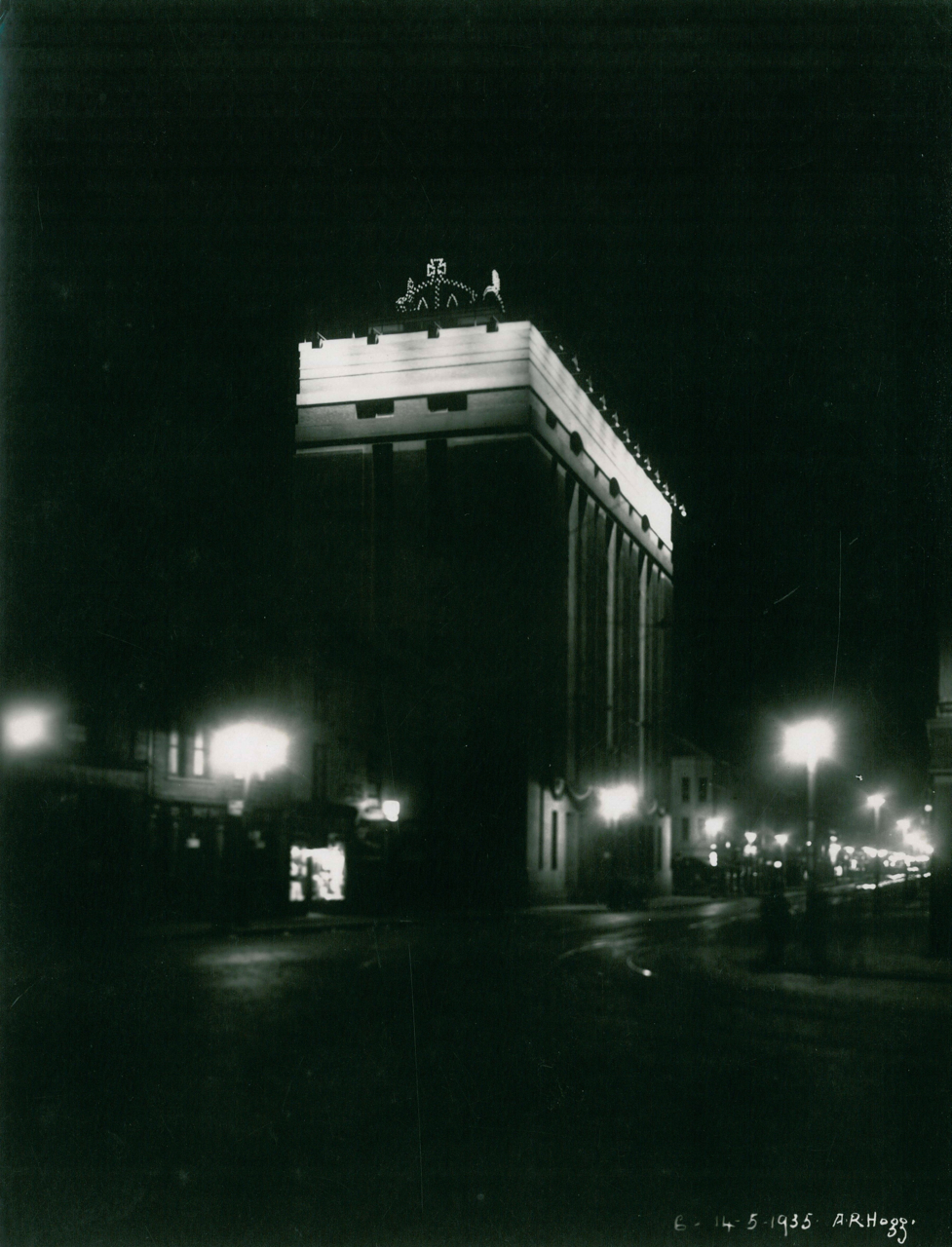
Telephone House
(1920–1939; Grade B2)

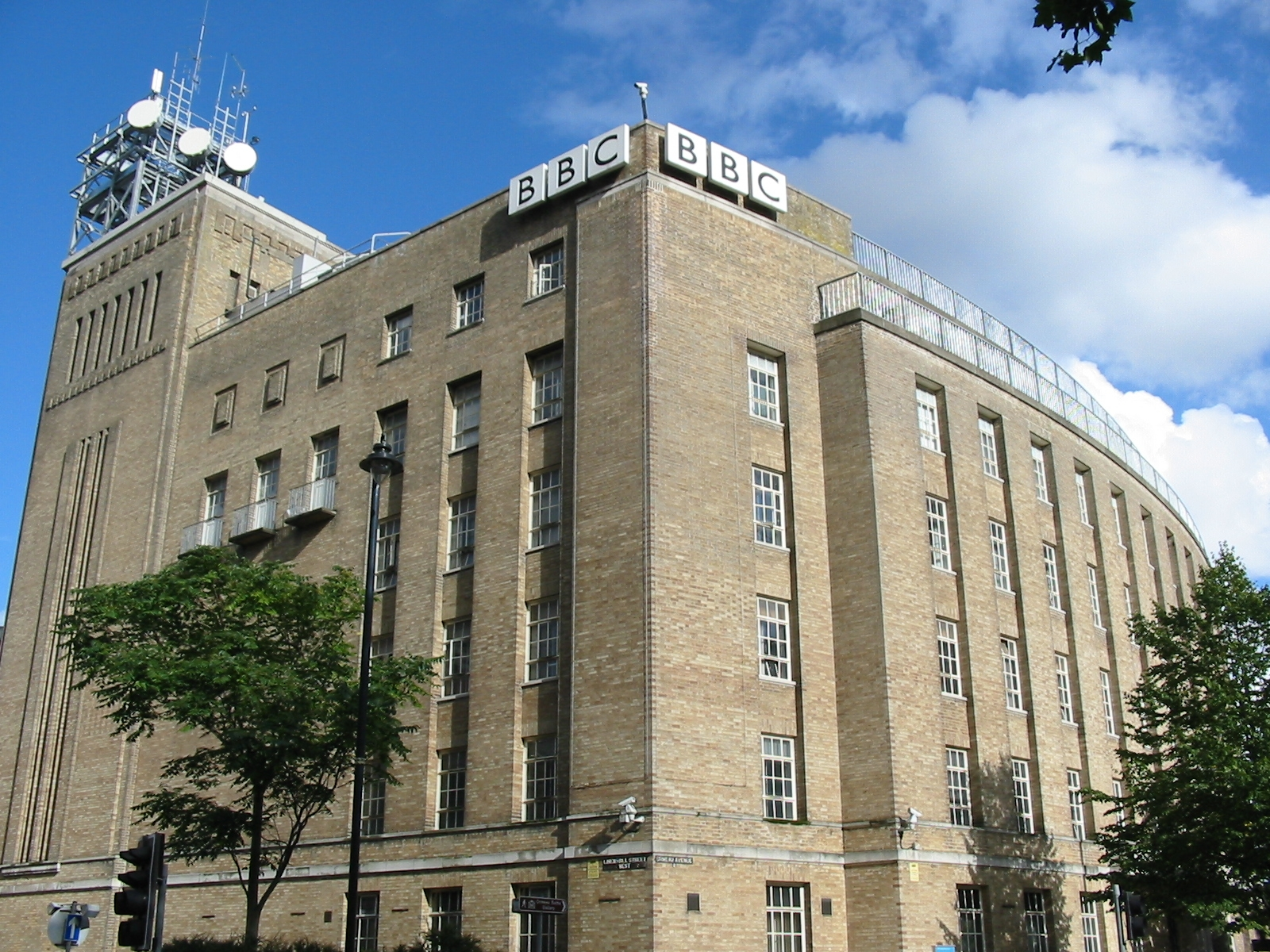
Broadcasting House
(1938–1941; Grade B1)

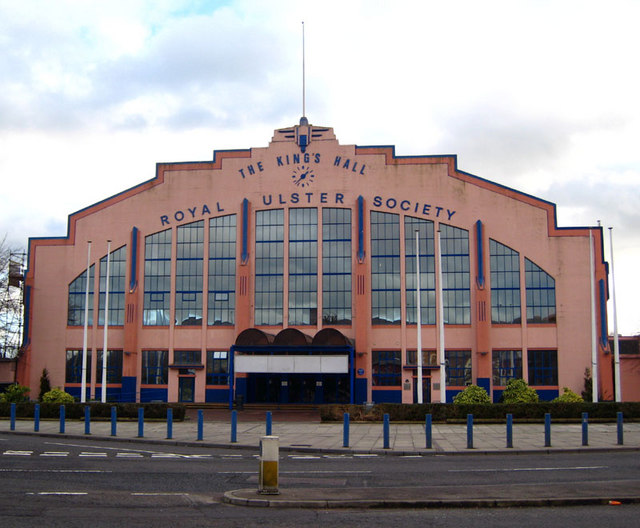
King's Hall (1930–1934; Grade B+)

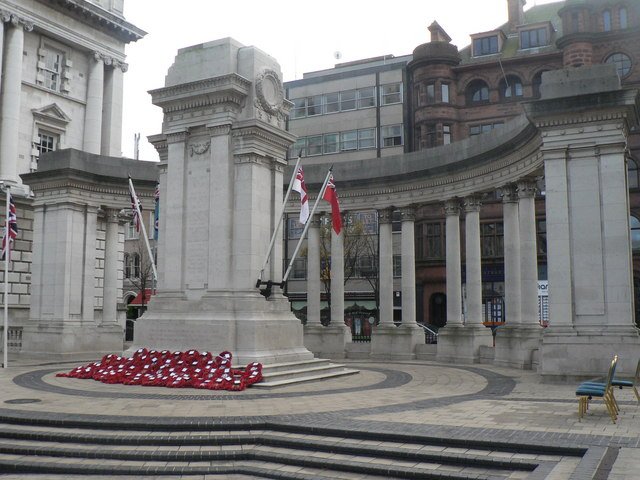
Belfast Cenotaph, Garden of Remembrance (1925–1929; Grade A)

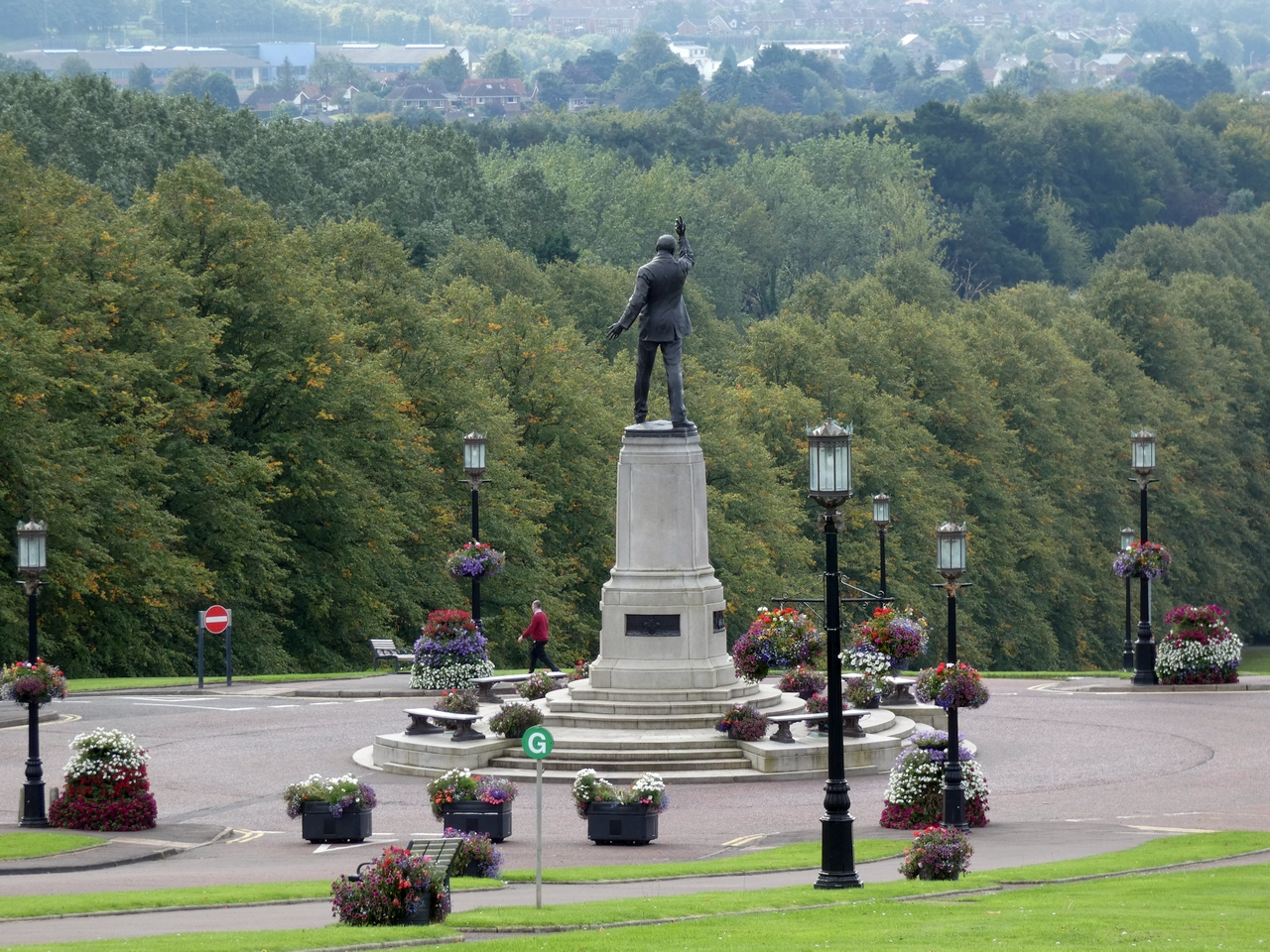
Sir Edward Carson statue (1933; Listed as part of Stormont Estate)

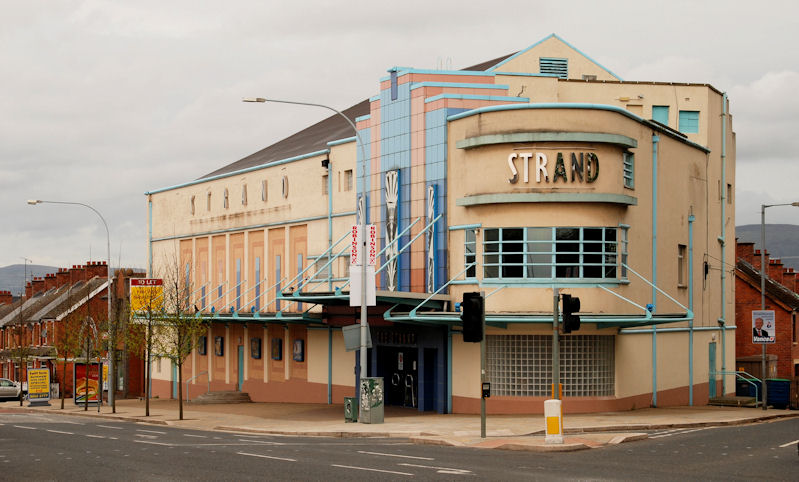
The Strand Cinema (1935; Grade B1)

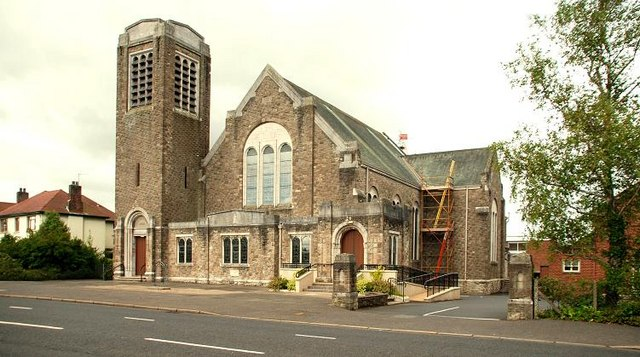
McCracken Memorial Presbyterian Church (1931; Grade B+)

==== Late 20th century ====
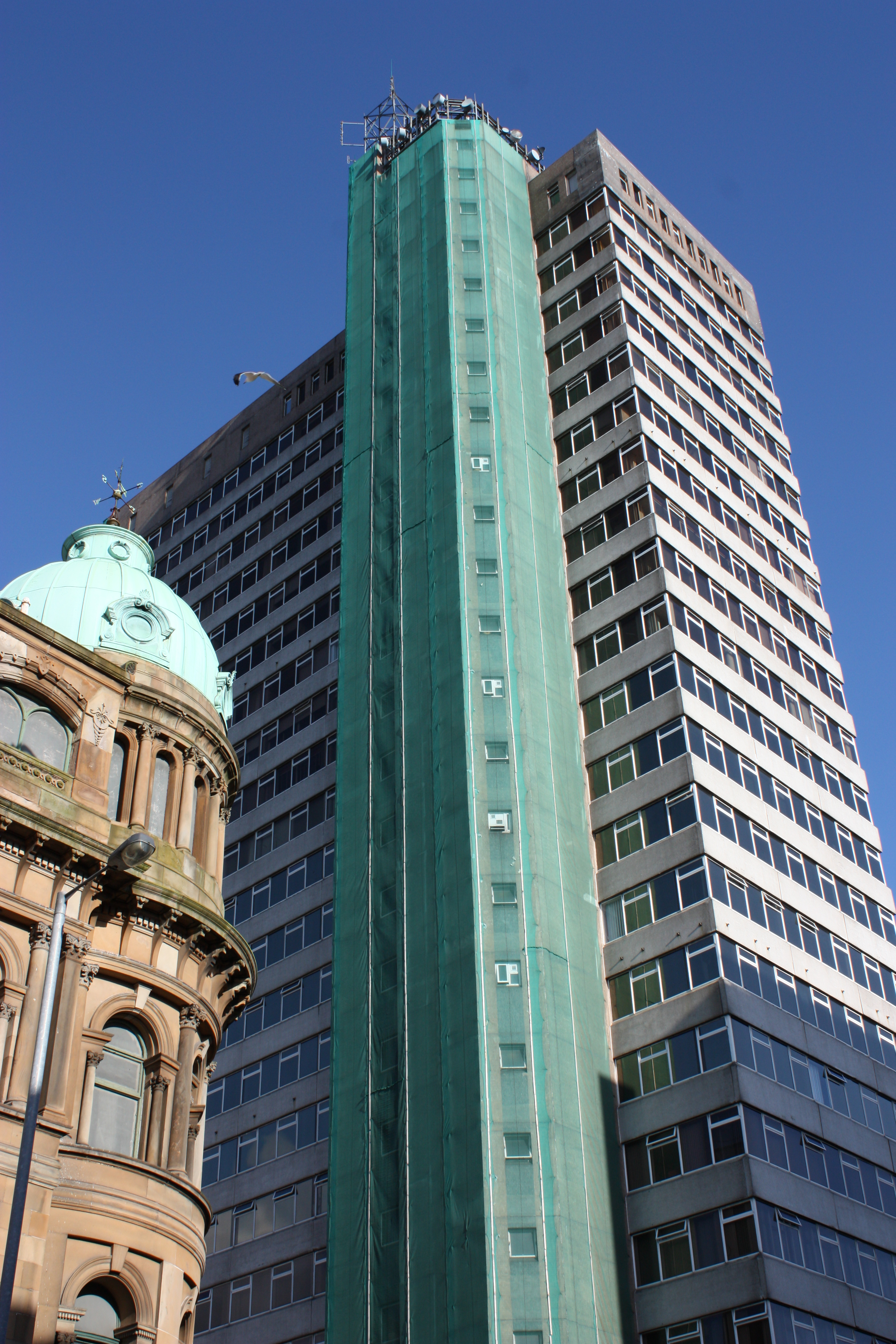
Windsor House
(1975)

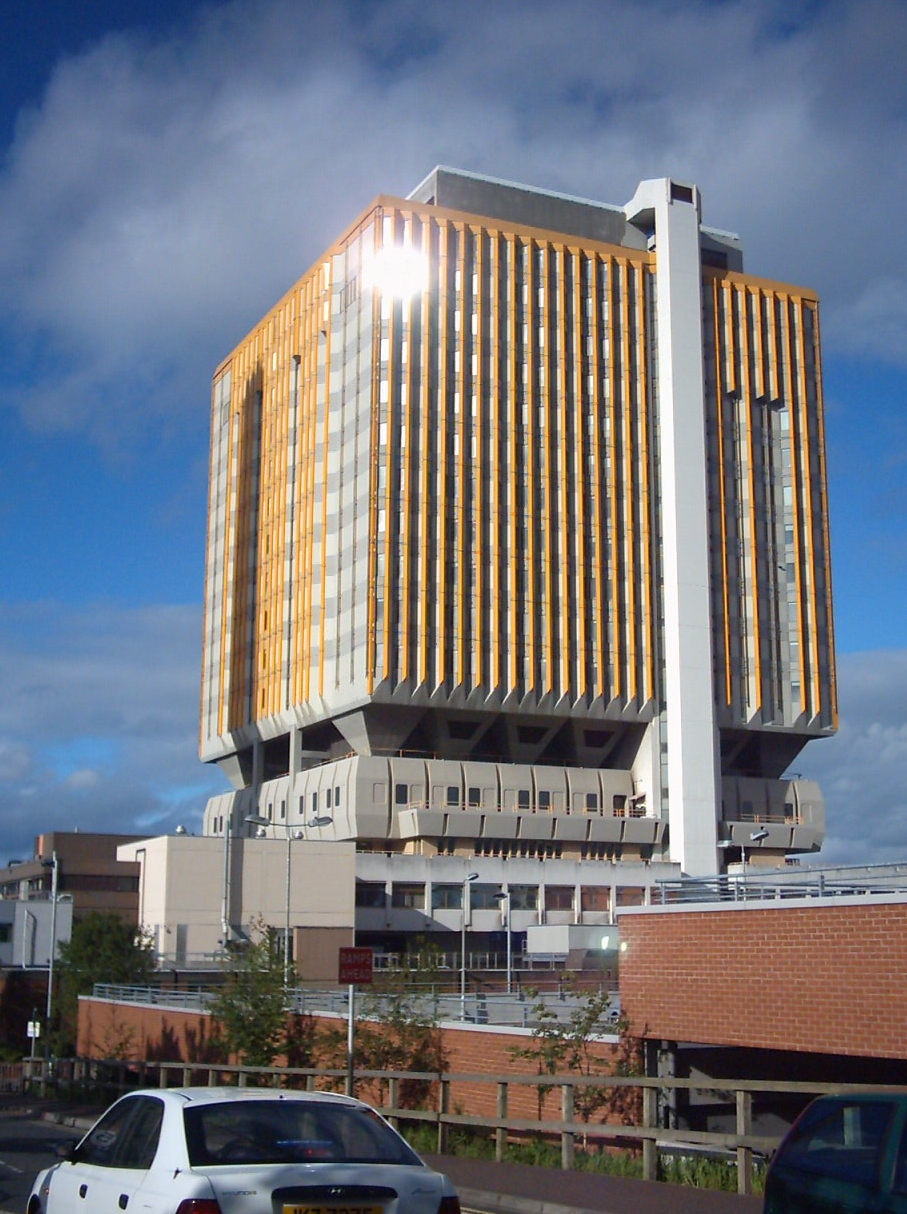
Belfast City Hospital Tower
(1986)

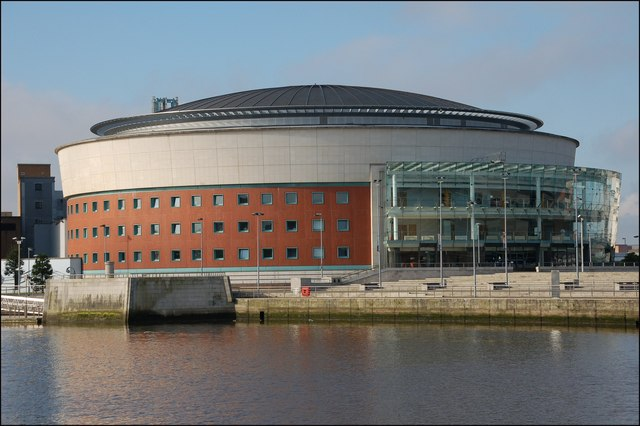
Waterfront Hall
(1995–1997)

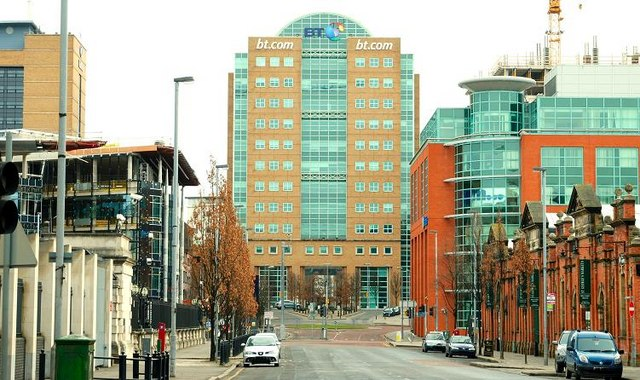
BT Riverside Tower
(1998)

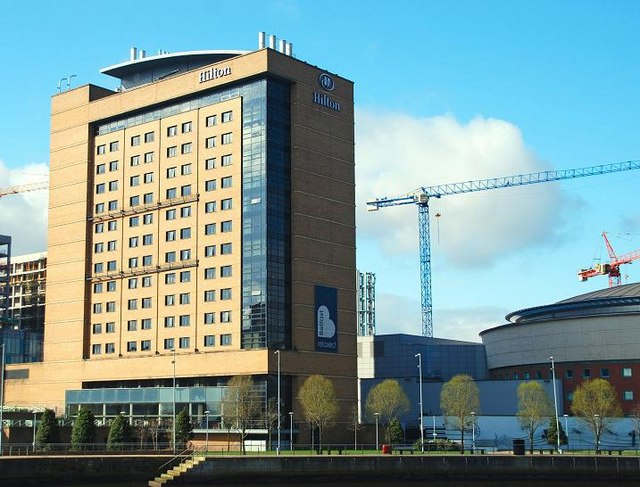
Belfast Hilton
(1998)

=== 21st century ===
In 2011 and 2012 Belfast saw the creation of two buildings described as "two of the most stunning new British buildings of the century", namely the Lyric Theatre (2011) by Irish architects O’Donnell and Tuomey, and the Metropolitan Arts Centre (2012) by local architectural practice Hackett Hall McKnight. In contrast, the new boat-shaped Titanic Museum (2012) was described by The Telegraph as "startlingly inane".

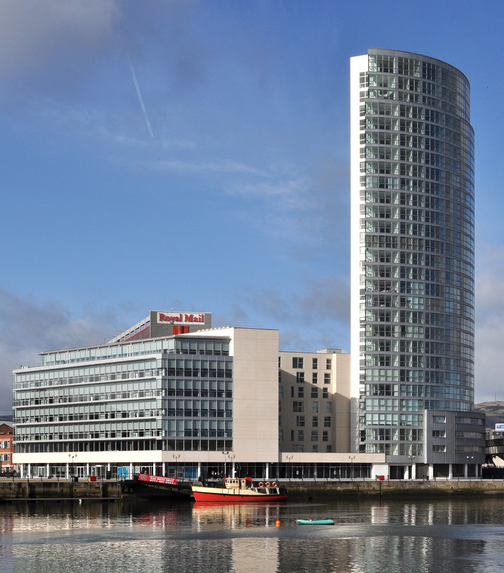
Obel Tower (2006–2011)

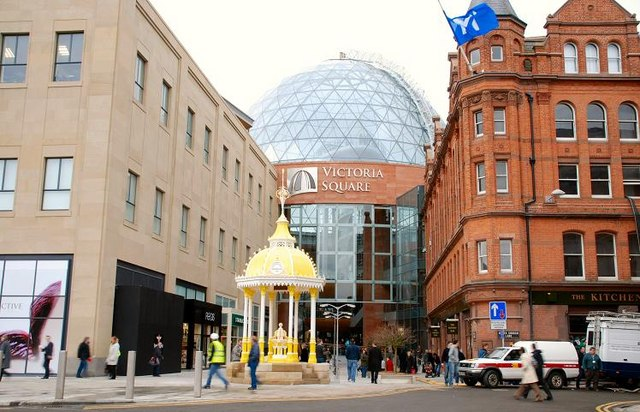
Victoria Square (2008)

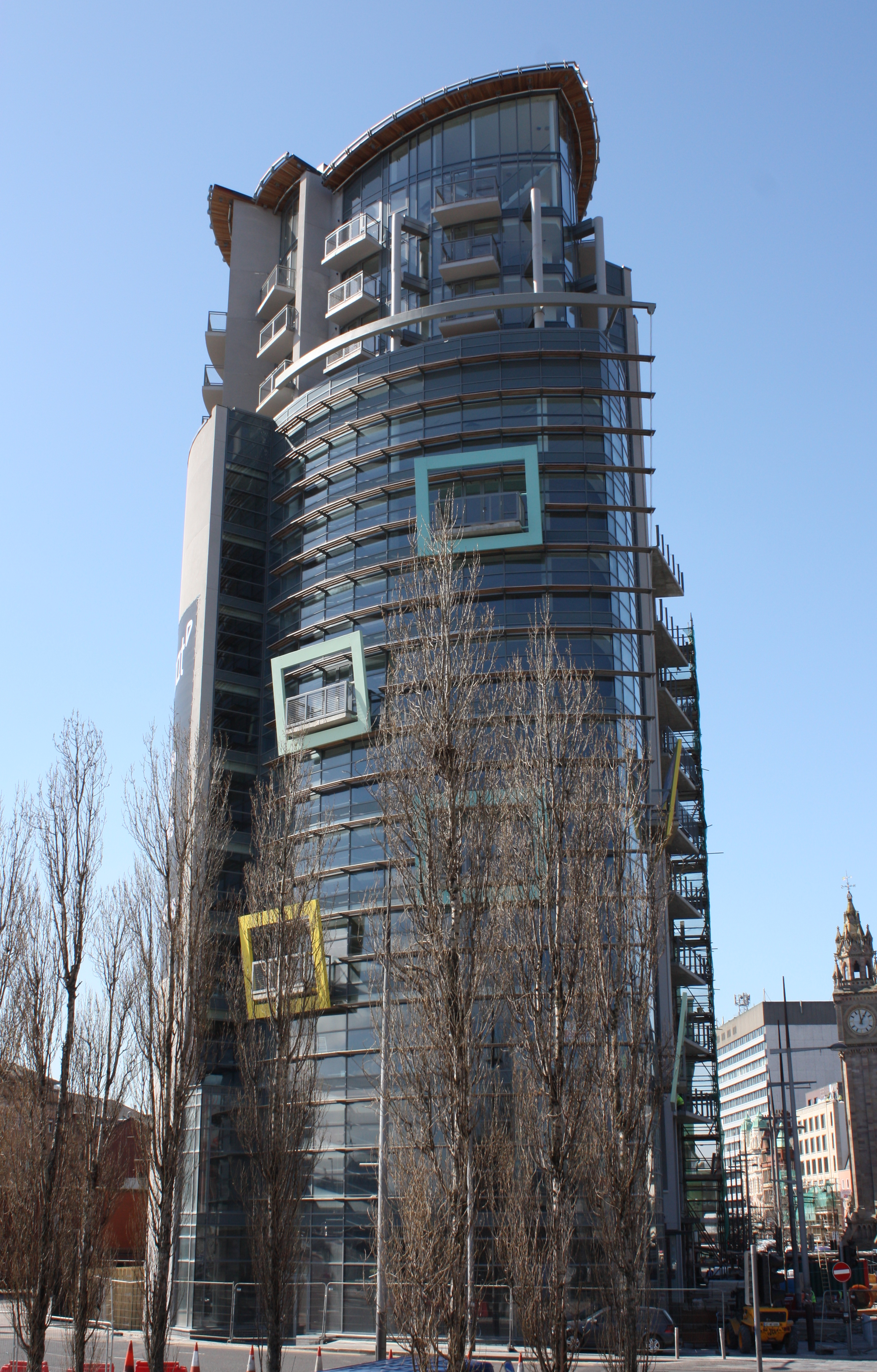
The Boat (2010)

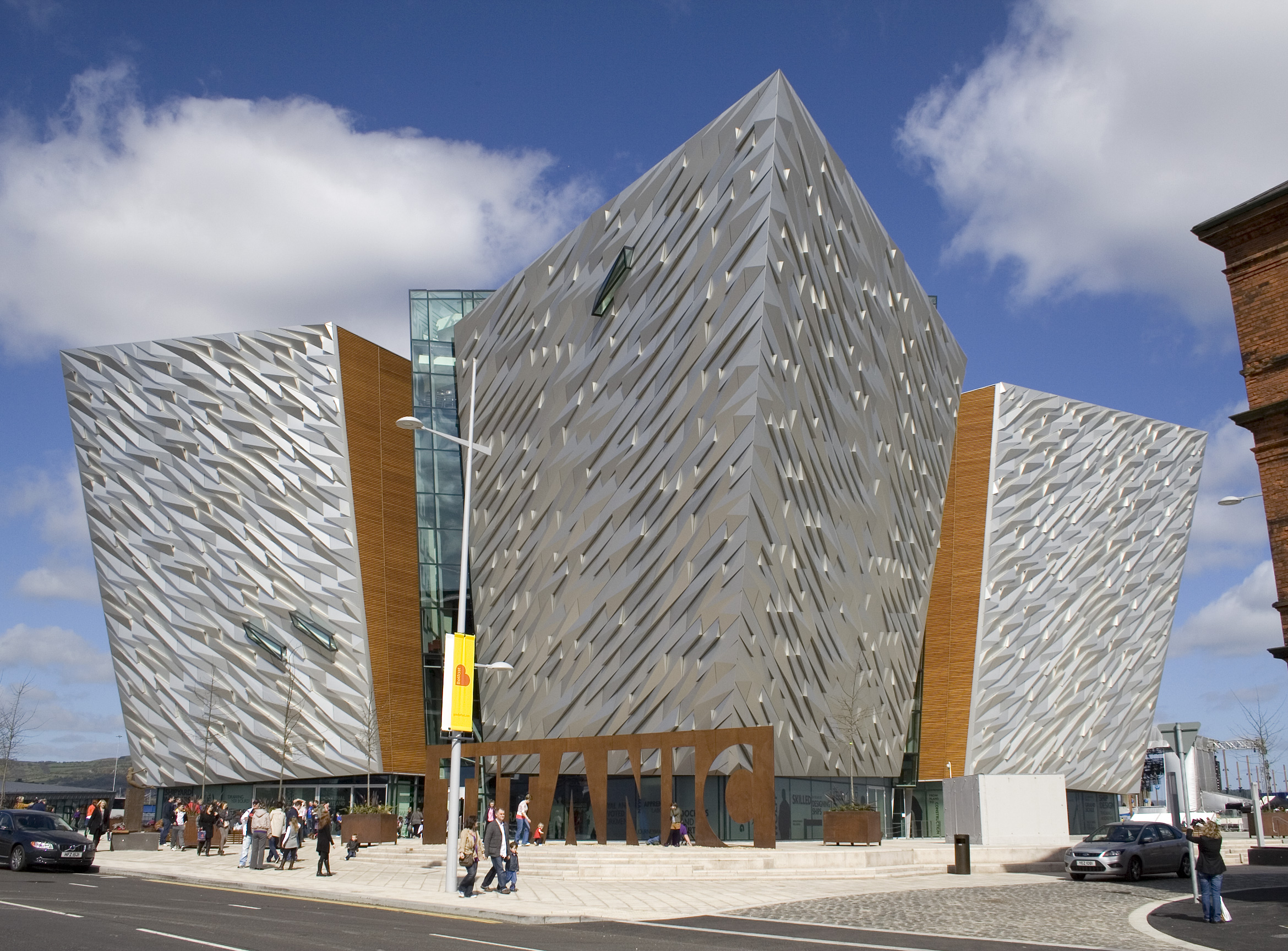
Titanic Belfast (2012)

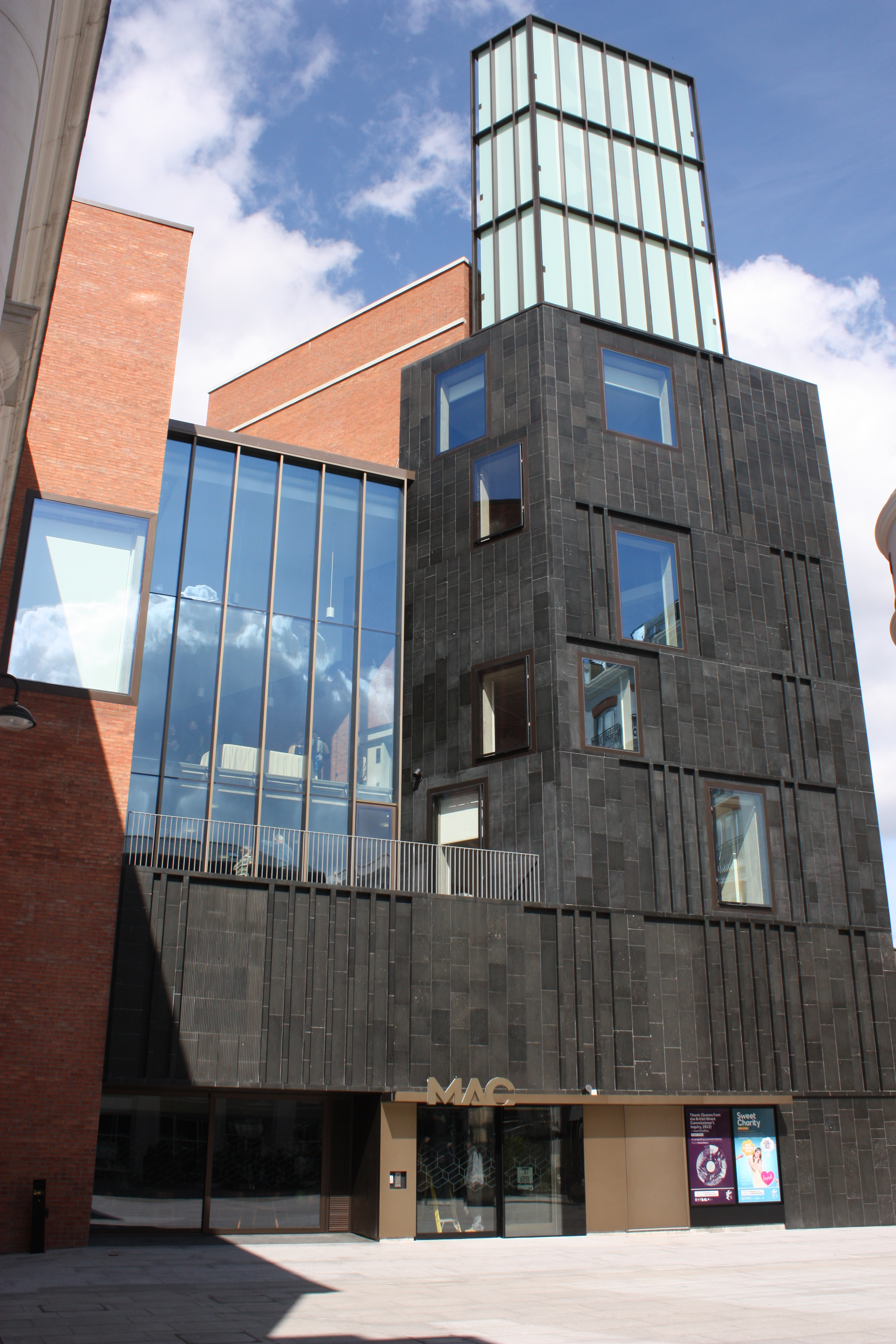
The MAC (2012)

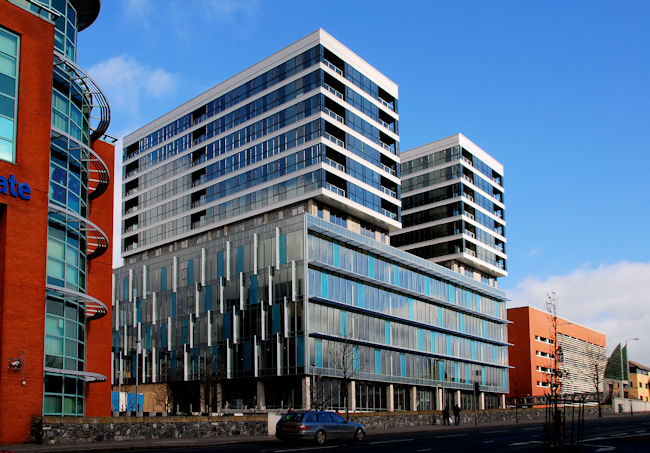
Lanyon Plaza (2014)

== See also ==
- List of parks and gardens in Belfast
- List of tallest buildings and structures in Belfast
- Buildings and structures in Belfast
