= Buildings and structures in Belfast =

The buildings and structures of Belfast, Northern Ireland comprise many styles of architecture ranging from Edwardian through to state-of-the-art modern buildings like the Waterfront Hall. The city's beautiful Edwardian buildings are notable for their display of a large number of sculptures. Many of Belfast's Victorian landmarks, including the main Lanyon Building at Queens University in 1849, were designed by Sir Charles Lanyon.

The City Hall, was finished in 1906 and was built to reflect Belfast's City status, granted by Queen Victoria in 1888. The Dome is 53 metres (173 ft) high. Figures above the door are "Hibernia encouraging and promoting the Commerce and Arts of the City". Among the city's grandest buildings are two former banks: Ulster Bank (1860), in Waring Street and Northern Bank (1769), in nearby Donegall Street. The Royal Courts of Justice in Chichester Street are home to Northern Ireland's Supreme Court. Some of Belfast's oldest buildings still remain in the Cathedral Quarter area, which is currently undergoing redevelopment as the city's main cultural and tourist area.

The world's largest dry dock is located in the city, and the giant cranes (Samson and Goliath) of the Harland & Wolff shipyard, builders of the Titanic, can be seen from afar. Other long-gone industries included Irish linen and rope-making.

The four star Europa Hotel, located in the City Centre, was bombed twenty-seven times during the troubles and is one of the most bombed hotels in Europe Across the street, the ornately decorated Crown Liquor Saloon in Great Victoria Street is notable as being the only bar owned by the National Trust. The panels used in the restaurant on the first floor were meant for Brittanic, the sister ship of the Titanic. It was made internationally famous as the setting for the classic film, Odd Man Out, starring James Mason.

Belfast also contains the tallest building (as distinct from structure) on the island of Ireland. The Obel Tower stands at 88 m (289 ft) and has twenty-eight floors. Windsor House at 80 m (260 ft) was the previous tallest building.

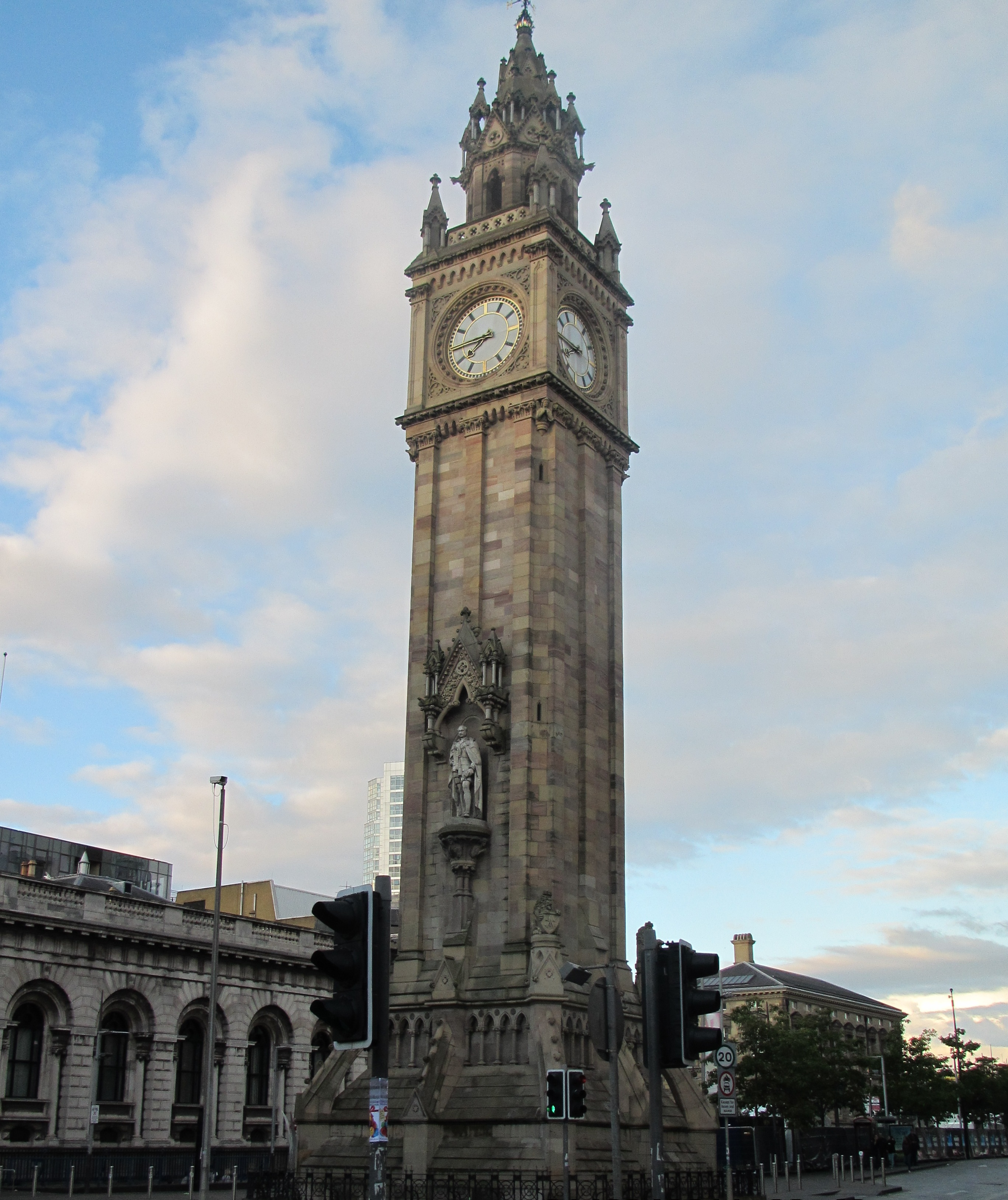
Albert Clock

The Albert Clock stands at the end of High Street, and was designed by William J. Barre and built in memory of Queen Victoria's Prince Consort, Prince Albert. The clock stands 35 m high, was built on land reclaimed from the river, and leans 1.25 m off the vertical. The Linen Hall Library in Donegall Square North is Belfast's oldest library, founded in 1788 to acquire 'philosophical apparatus and such productions of nature and art as are calculated to enlarge knowledge'

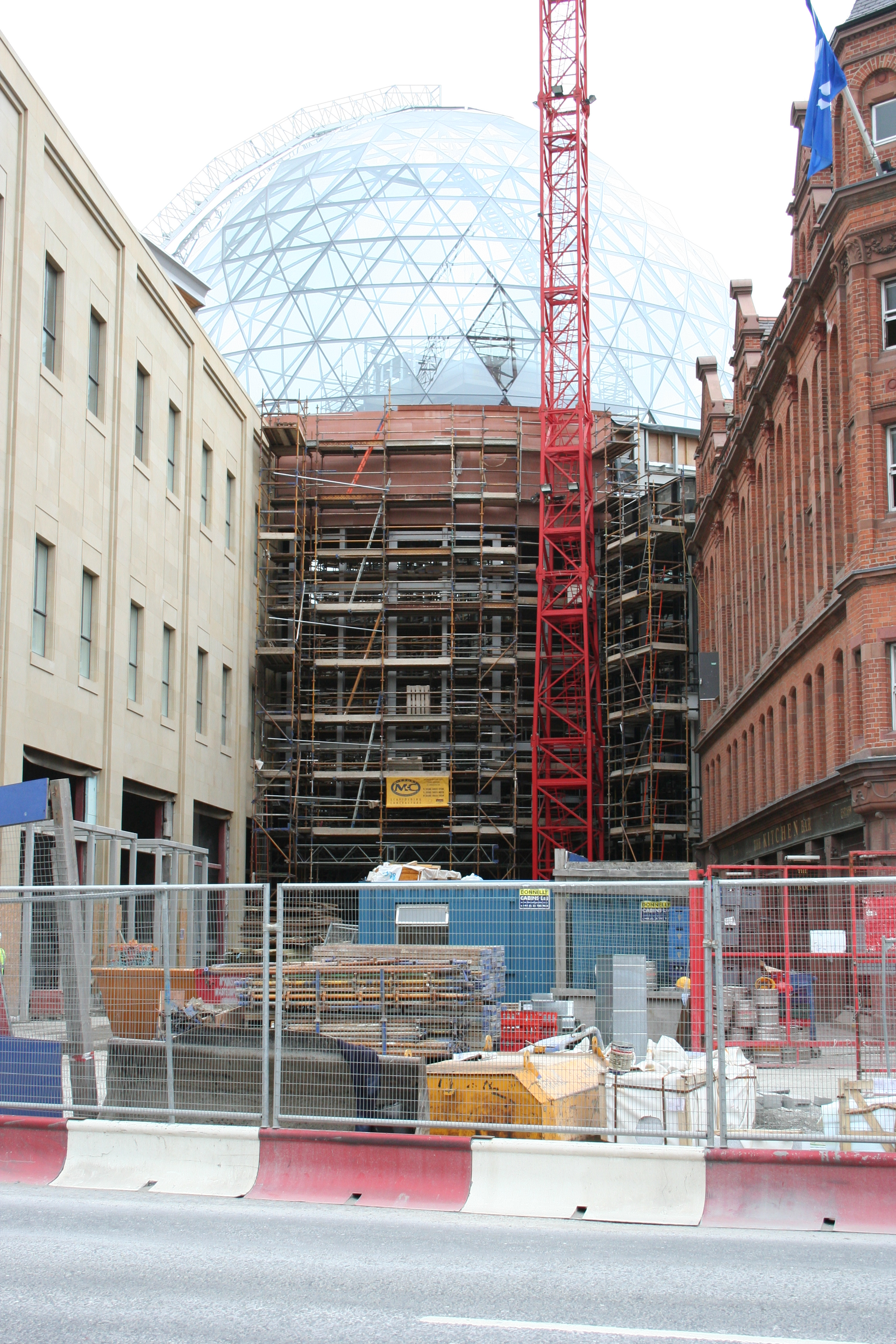
Construction of Victoria Square development August 2007

St George's Market, built between 1890 and 1896, is Belfast's last surviving Victorian covered market. It was restored at a cost of £4.5 million in 1997, and hosts regular Friday and Saturday markets. Near the Market is Saint Malachy's Catholic Church. Built between 1841 and 1844, it is built in the Tudor Revival style and is unique in Ireland. It is also one of only two buildings remaining in Belfast which was constructed with hand-made bricks. Hamilton Street is a Georgian terrace in the Markets Area, originally built in the 1830s, which was restored in 1988 by Hearth.

Belfast has several major performing arts venues. The Grand Opera House,completed in 1895, was restored to its original style after being bombed several times during the Troubles. The Ulster Hall (1859–1862) was originally designed for grand dances but is now used primarily for concerts and sporting events. It features 13 paintings depicting Belfast history and houses the Mulholland organ, which was donated by local industrialist Andrew Mulholland. Prominent political figures including Lloyd George, Parnell and Patrick Pearse helppolitical rallies there The Waterfront Hall was opened in 1997 as part of the redevelopment of the Laganside and already has become an icon of modern Belfast. Under construction in 2007 is the new Victoria Square development with a huge glass dome. The Victoria Square is now completed.

== See also ==
- Belfast
- Architecture of Belfast
- List of tallest buildings and structures in Belfast
- Districts of Belfast
- List of parks and gardens in Belfast
- Sir Charles Lanyon
