= List of tallest buildings in Ireland =

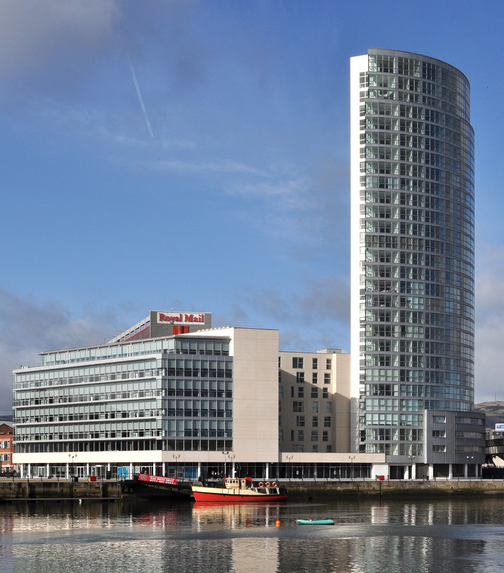
Obel Tower in Belfast

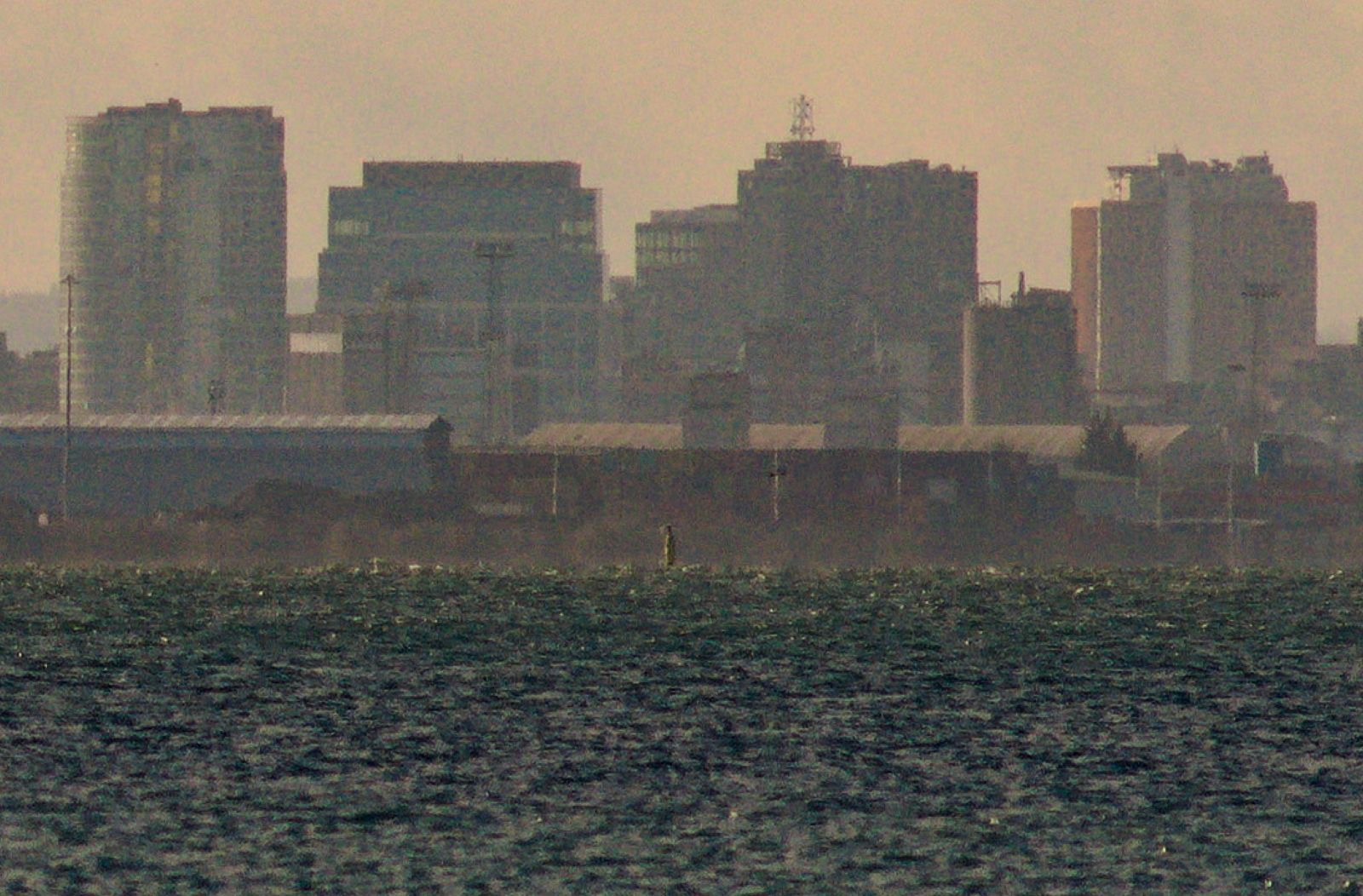
Belfast skyline with the tallest buildings in Northern Ireland

This is a list of the tallest habitable buildings on the island of Ireland (used for living and working in, as opposed to masts and churches). This includes both Northern Ireland in the United Kingdom, and the Republic of Ireland. The island of Ireland has relatively few tall buildings. The island's first tall building was Liberty Hall, built in 1965, which stands at 60.2 metres (198 ft). The current tallest habitable building on the island of Ireland is the Obel Tower in Belfast, Northern Ireland at 85 metres (279 ft). The tallest storied building in the Republic of Ireland is College Square in Dublin, at about 82 metres (269 ft).

== Tallest habitable buildings ==
=== Northern Ireland ===
The tallest building on the island of Ireland upon completion
The tallest building in Northern Ireland upon completion

Rank	Name	Location	Type	Year completed	Floors (above ground)	Height	Picture
1	Obel Tower	Belfast	Residential	2010	28	85 m (279 ft)	
2	Grand Central Hotel	Belfast	Hotel	1975	23	80 m (260 ft)	
3	Belfast City Hospital	Belfast	Hospital	1986	15	76 m (249 ft)	
4	City Quays 3	Belfast	Office	2022	16	73.8 m (242 ft)	
5	The Ewart Building	Belfast	Office	2022	17	73 m (240 ft)	
6	Belfast Hilton Hotel	Belfast	Hotel	1998	16	63 m (207 ft)	
7	BT Riverside Tower	Belfast	Office	1998	14	62 m (203 ft)	
8	Divis Tower	Belfast	Residential	1966	20	61 m (200 ft)	

=== Republic of Ireland ===
The tallest building on the island of Ireland upon completion
The tallest building in the Republic of Ireland upon completion

Rank	Name	Location	Type	Year completed	Floors (above ground)	Height	Picture
1	College Square	Dublin	Mixed-use	2025	22	82.1 m (269 ft)	
2	The Elysian	Cork	Mixed-use	2008	18	80.7 m (265 ft)	
3	Capital Dock	Dublin	Mixed-use	2018	23	79 m (259 ft)	
4	The Exo Building	Dublin	Office	2021	17	73.8 m (242 ft)	
5	Cork County Hall	Cork	Office	1968	17	66.8 m (219 ft) (64.3m (211 ft) originally)	
6	Google Docks	Dublin	Office	2010	15	65.6 m (215 ft)	
7	Liberty Hall	Dublin	Office	1965	17	60.2 m (198 ft)	
8	One George's Quay Plaza	Dublin	Office	2002	13	59 m (194 ft)	
9	Riverpoint	Limerick	Mixed use	2008	15	58.5 m (192 ft)	
10	The Gateway Hotel	Dundalk	Hotel	2007	14	58 m (190 ft)	

== Tallest buildings by city/town ==
This list only includes places with buildings taller than 58 m (190 ft). Cities/towns in light blue are in Northern Ireland.

City	Building	Height	Floor count	Completed
Belfast	Obel Tower	85 m (279 ft)	28	2010
Dublin	College Square	82.1 m (269 ft)	22	2025
Cork	The Elysian	80.7 m (265 ft)	18	2008
Limerick	Riverpoint	58.5 m (192 ft)	15	2008
Dundalk	The Gateway Hotel	58 m (190 ft)	14	2007

== Under construction ==
The below list contains details of buildings with a planned height of over 58 m (190 ft) which are construction in Ireland.

Rank	Name	Location	Type	Floors (above ground)	Height	Notes
1	Block A, Parkgate Street	Dublin	Residential	30	102 m (335 ft)	Construction scheduled to commence in August 2026. Is due to become the first habitable building on the island of Ireland to pass the 100 m mark.
2	The Railyard	Cork	Residential	25	85.53 m (281 ft)	Construction commenced in 2025.
3	Waterfront South Central	Dublin	Mixed-use	25	83.6 m (274 ft)	Construction commenced in 2023.
4	Opera Square	Limerick	Commercial	14	66 m (216 ft)	Construction commenced in 2026.
5	Glass Bottle 1B	Dublin	Residential	18	64.4 m (211 ft)	Construction commenced in 2023.
6	2 Grand Canal Quay	Dublin	Office	15	64.1 m (210 ft)	Construction commenced in 2023.
7	Player Wills Block PW2	Dublin	Residential	19	63.05 m (207 ft)	Construction commenced in 2026.
8	Glass Bottle 1	Dublin	Residential	16	61.1 m (200 ft)	Construction commenced in 2023.
9	Castleforbes Block C2	Dublin	Residential	18	60.7 m (199 ft)	Construction commenced in 2023 Topped out in 2025.
10	Bankmore Exchange	Belfast	Office	14	58 m (190 ft)	Site prep commenced in 2024 and construction commenced in June 2025.

== Cancelled ==
The below list contains details of notable buildings with a planned height of over 58 m (190 ft) which were under construction when the project was stopped or cancelled.

Rank	Name	Location	Type	Floors (above ground)	Height	Year cancelled	Notes
1	U2 Tower	Dublin	Mixed-use	36	130 m (427 ft)	2008	3 basement floors were completed at the time of cessation of the project. The site was later used to house Capital Dock.
2	The Watchtower	Dublin	Hotel	40	120 m (394 ft)	2013	Site was sold to Nama in 2013 and is now partially used as the site of the Exo Building.

== See also ==
- List of tallest structures in Ireland
- List of tallest buildings and structures in Belfast
- List of tallest buildings and structures in Dublin
