= College Square (Dublin) =

Mixed-use building in Dublin, Ireland

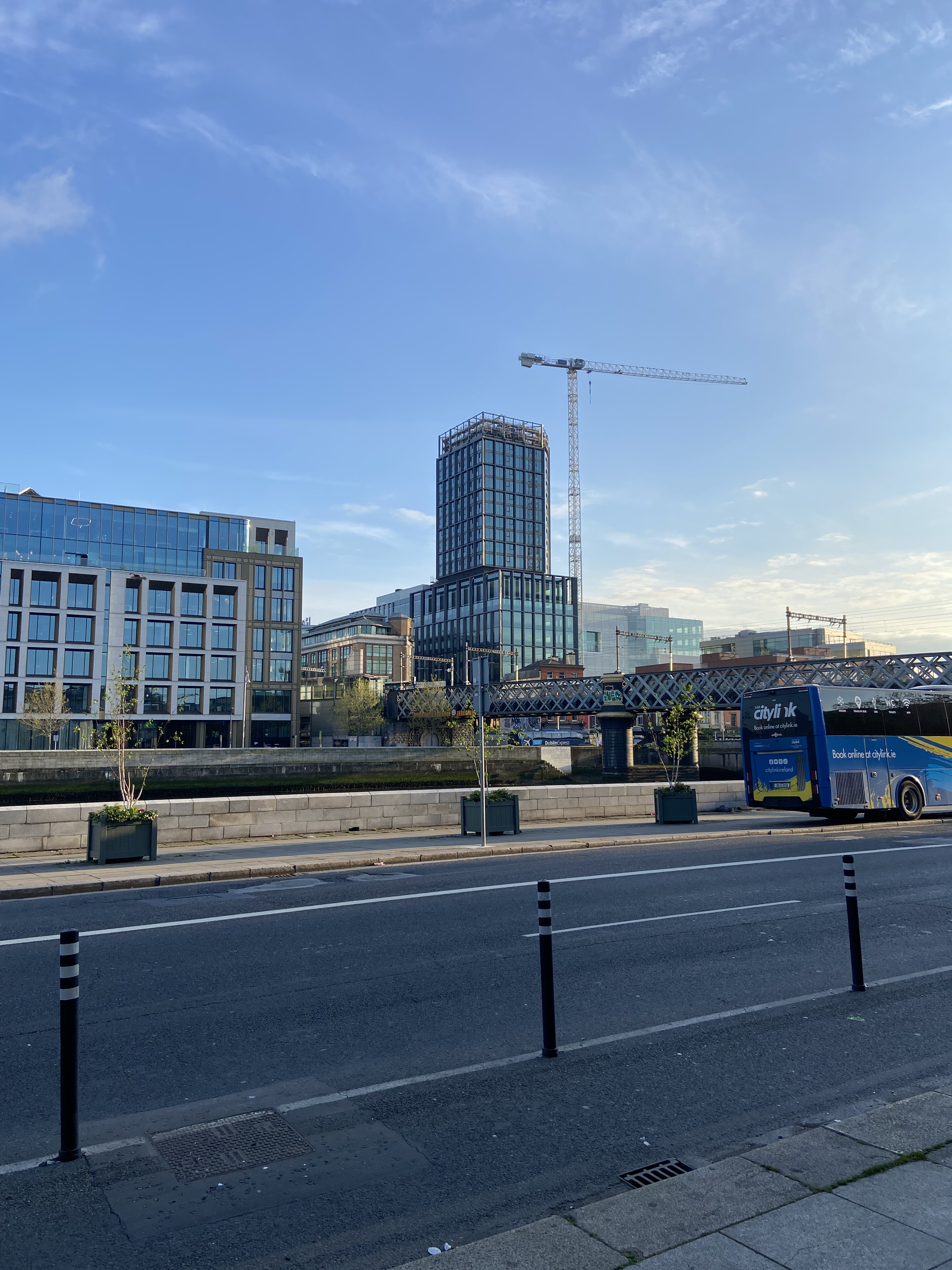
- College Square under construction in April 2025

General information
- Type: Office, residential
- Location: Hawkins Street, Dublin, Ireland
- Coordinates: 53.346°N 6.256°W

Height
- Height: 82m

Technical details
- Floor count: 22

Design and construction
- Architecture firm: Henry J Lyons
- Developer: Marlet
- Main contractor: Walls Construction

Website
- marlet.ie/project/college-square

College Square is a mixed-use building development in Dublin, Ireland. The building is located between Townsend Street, Hawkins Street, Poolbeg Street and Tara Street in the Dublin 2 postal district. Completed in 2025, it is the tallest habitable building in the Republic of Ireland, with a height of 82 metres, surpassing the previous tallest building, Capital Dock (also in Dublin). It is also the second-tallest building on the island of Ireland, after Obel Tower in Belfast, as well as the first building in the Republic to exceed a height of 80 metres.

== Background ==
The site of the development was located close to or at what was originally the River Liffey estuary and adjacent to what was originally the Viking landing spot and marking spot known as the steyn of Dublin. The position was later the location of one of the Royal Dublin Society's first premises on Hawkins Street from 1796 until around 1816. A Catholic church had also stood on the site since 1709.

College Square is located on the sites of the former Theatre Royal, Hawkins House, College House and the Screen Cinema, which were demolished between 2017 and 2020.

In 2021, Marlet Property Group began the construction of College Square after a €270 million agreement with Apollo Global Management and Pimco was signed.

Initially, the development plans consisted of an 11-storey office. In 2020, An Bord Pleanála approved plans for a 10-storey residential tower on top of the office block, which was then extended by one more floor in 2022, increasing the final height of the building from 78 metres to 82 metres.

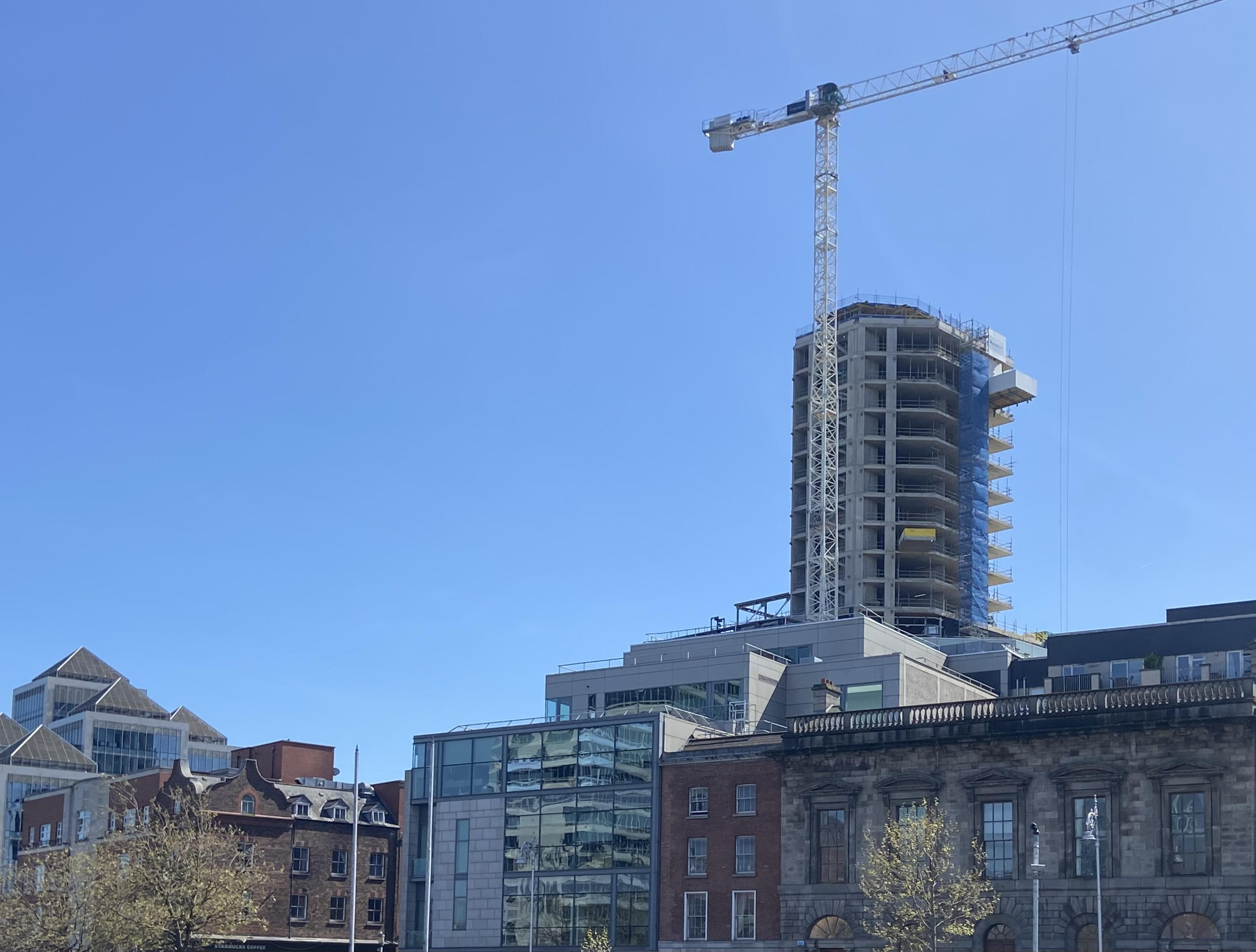
College Square under construction seen from Rosie Hackett Bridge in April 2024.

== Construction ==
Construction on the site had commenced by 2023, with the development reportedly reaching "level 13" during September 2023. The developer, Walls Construction, stated that construction of the site's 11-storey residential tower had reached "practical completion" by September 2025.
