= List of tallest buildings and structures in Dublin =

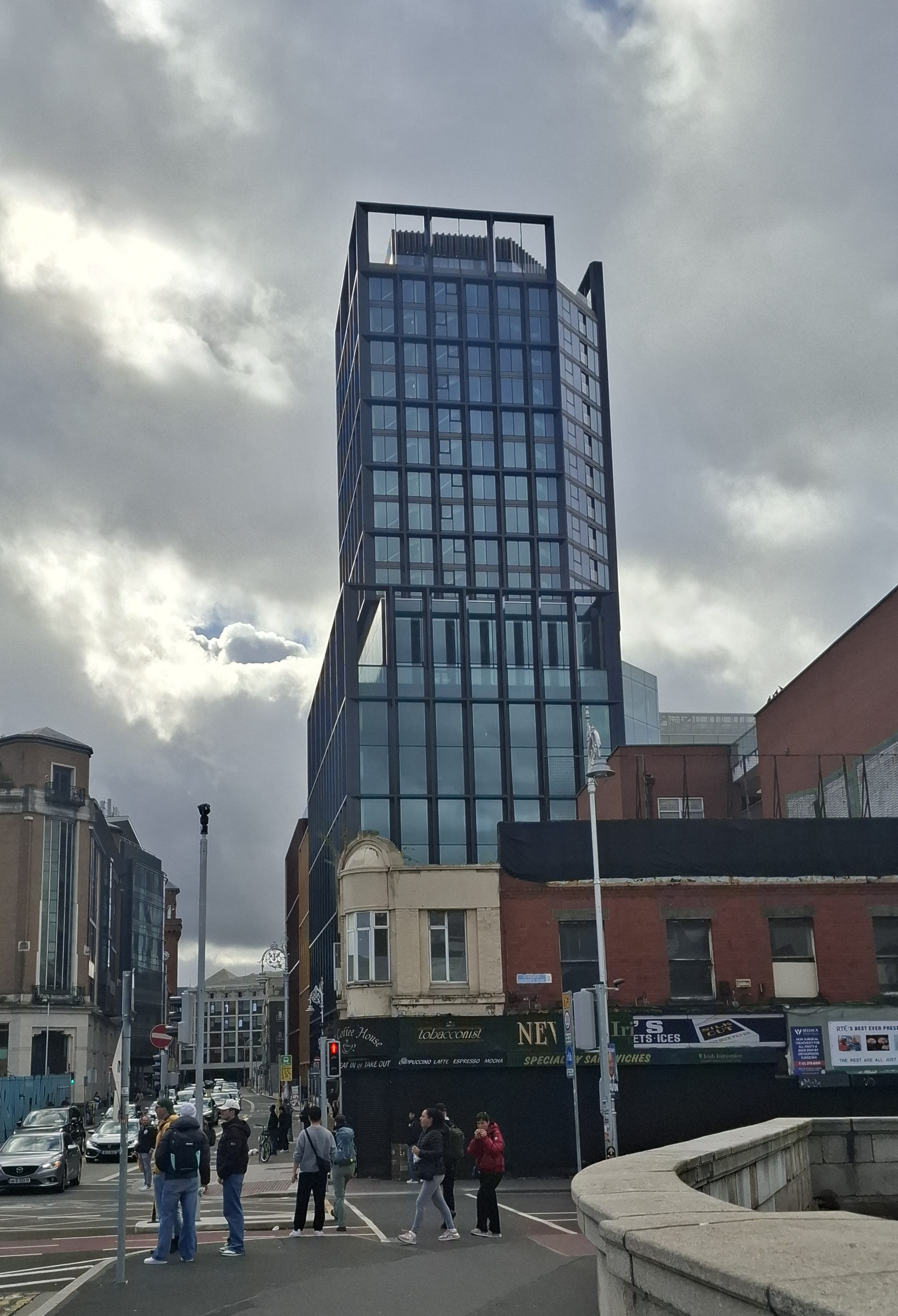
Dublin's current tallest building College Square, seen here topped out in 2025

This list ranks the tallest externally complete buildings and structures in County Dublin, Ireland, which stand over 50 metres (160 ft) tall.

As of December 2023, there are 6 nonbuilding structures over 80 metres (260 ft) tall and 14 buildings over 50 metres (160 ft) tall. Dublin's tallest structure is Poolbeg power station chimney 2 which is 207.8 metres (682 ft) tall while Dublin's tallest building is College Square which is 82 metres (269 ft) tall.

== Tallest habitable buildings ==
This list ranks habitable buildings in Dublin that stand more than 50 metres (160 ft) tall, based on height to the highest architectural feature.

Was Dublin's tallest building upon completion
Topped out but not yet complete

Rank	Name	Use	Image	Height (m)	Height (ft)	Floors	Year built	Notes
1	College Square	Mixed Use		82.1	269	21	2025	
2	Capital Dock	Mixed use		79	259	22	2018	
3	The Exo Building	Office		73.8	226	17	2022	
4	Google Docks	Office		65.6	220	15	2010	
5	Batch House	Residential		64.4	211	18	2026	
6	2 Grand Canal Quay	Office		64.1	210	15	2026	
7	Sand House	Residential		61.1	200	16	2026	
8	Castleforbes Block C2	Residential		60.7	199	18	2025	
9	Liberty Hall	Office		60.2	195	17	1965	
10	One George's Quay Plaza	Office		59	194	13	2002	
11	Sandyford Central, Block D	Residential		57	187	17	2023	
12	Convention Centre Dublin	Mixed Use		55	180	6	2010	
13	Boland's Quay 1	Mixed Use		54	177	13	2025	
14	Moxy Dublin Docklands	Hotel		52.7	173	15	2024	
15	Metro Hotel, Ballymun	Hotel		52.1	171	15	2005	
16	The Signal House	Residential		51.9	170	15	2026	
17	Castleforbes Block B3C3	Residential		51.2	168	15	2025	
18	Alto Vetro	Residential		51	167	16	2008	

== Tallest churches ==
Rank	Name	Use	Image	Height (m)	Height (ft)	Year of construction	Notes
1	John's Lane Church	Church		70.4	230	1895	
2	St Patrick's Cathedral, Dublin	Church		66.4	218	1254 (spire dates to 1749)	
3	St. George's Church, Dublin	Church		61	200	1802	
4	Abbey Presbyterian Church, Dublin	Church		54.9	180	1864	

== Tallest nonbuilding structures ==
Rank	Name	Use	Image	Height (m)	Height (ft)	Year built	Notes
1	Poolbeg Generating Station, Chimney 2	Chimney		207.8	682 and 681	1978 and 1970	
2	Poolbeg Generating Station, Chimney 1	Chimney		207.48	681	1970	
3	Three Rock transmitter	Guyed Mast		152.4	500	2002	(Note: The second reference states total height above sea level subtracting the mountain's height gives approximately the same height as first source)
4	Spire of Dublin	Monument		120	394	2002	
5	Donnybrook transmitter	Lattice Tower radio transmitter		109.7	360		
6	Dublin Airport air traffic control tower	Air traffic control tower		87.7	288	2020	The Republic of Ireland's tallest occupied structure

== Approved and under construction ==
Name	Height (m)	Floors	Status	Notes
26 Parkgate Street	102	30	Planning permission granted	
Tara House (Aqua Vetro)	88	22	Planning permission granted	

== Cancelled buildings ==
Name	Height (m)	Floors above ground	Notes
The Watchtower	120	35	Construction had commenced at the time of cessation of the project. The site was later used for The Exo Building.
Heuston Gate	117	32	Proposed by the Office of Public Works in 2001, as part of an urban renewal project at Military Road near Heuston Station, the project had been cancelled by 2008.
U2 Tower	78	25	Construction had commenced at the time of cessation of the project. The site was later used for Capital Dock.

== See also ==
- List of tallest structures in Ireland
- List of tallest buildings in Ireland
