= Clayton Hotel, Limerick =

Hotel in Ireland

The Clayton Hotel Limerick
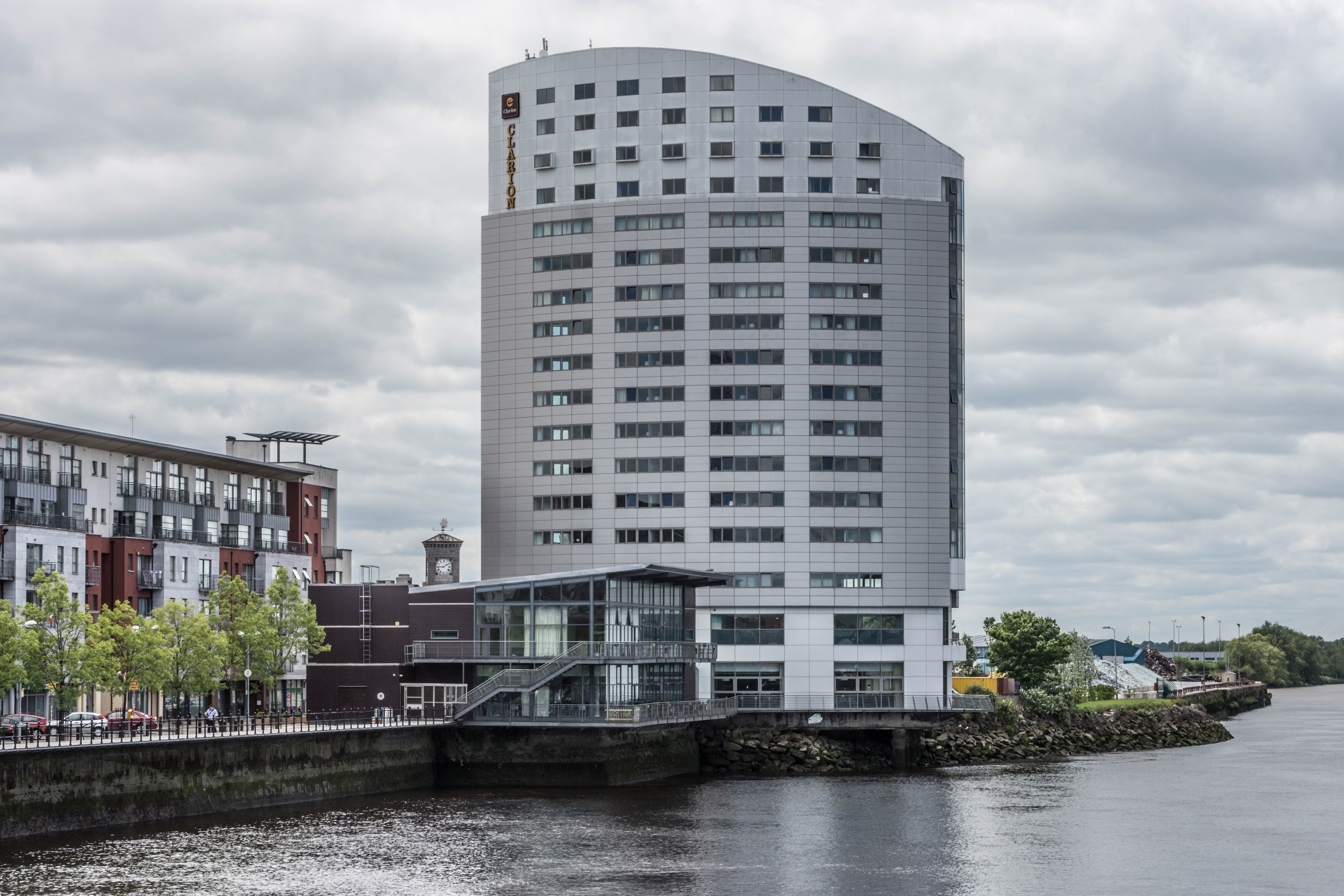
- The Clayton Hotel, on Steamboat Quay, in 2015
- Interactive map of the The Clayton Hotel Limerick area

General information
- Location: Steamboat Quay, Limerick; Ireland
- Coordinates: 52°39′36.72″N 8°38′16.72″W
- Opening: July 2002
- Owner: Clayton Hotels
- Management: Clayton Hotels

Technical details
- Floor count: 17

Other information
- Number of rooms: 158
- Number of suites: 3
- Number of restaurants: 2 + 1 Bar

Website
- claytonhotellimerick.com

Clayton Hotel Limerick (formerly branded as a Clarion Hotel) is a 17-storey hotel located beside the River Shannon on Steamboat Quay in Limerick. Part of the Dalata Hotel Group, the hotel was built in 2002 at a cost of €20 million.

== Facilities ==
The Clayton Hotel in Limerick City is a 4 star hotel and is currently Ireland's tallest hotel. It rises 187 ft above Limerick making it the 2nd tallest building in Limerick after Riverpoint and the 13th tallest storied building on the island of Ireland. The hotel has 158 riverside rooms, 3 suites and a penthouse. The penthouse, situated on the highest living floor, has views of the city. The hotel also has a gym, a 12-metre pool, sauna, steam room and a restaurant.

== See also ==
- Riverpoint
- List of tallest buildings in Ireland
