= List of tallest buildings and structures in Belfast =

Tall buildings in Belfast
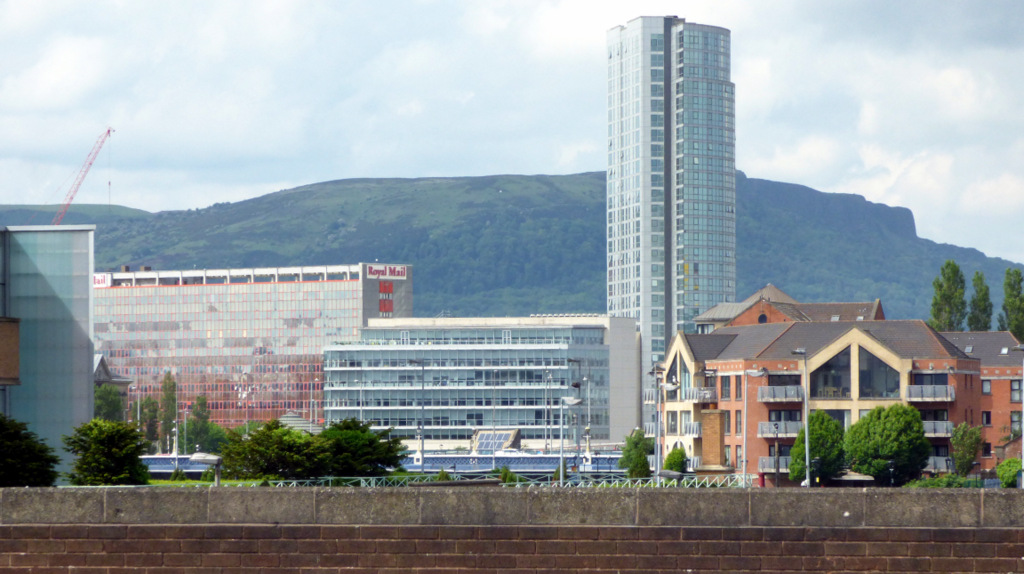
- A portion of Belfast's skyline in 2019, featuring Obel Tower
- Tallest building: Obel Tower (2010)
- Tallest building height: 85 m (279 ft)

Number of tall buildings
- Taller than 50 m (164 ft): 18 (2025)

This list of the tallest buildings and structures in Belfast ranks buildings and structures in Belfast, Northern Ireland, by height. Belfast is the capital and largest city of Northern Ireland, and hosts the majority of its high-rise buildings. The tallest building in the city is Obel Tower at 86 metres (282 feet), a residential high-rise completed in 2010. It is the tallest building in both Northern Ireland and the entire island of Ireland. The tallest structure is the Black Mountain transmitting station, which rises to a height of 228.6 m (750 ft)

There are at least 10 structures in the city taller than 80 metres (260 ft) and there are at least 36 habitable buildings in the city taller than 45 metres (148 ft).

== Tallest by category ==
- The tallest building in Belfast is the Obel Tower at 86 metres (282 feet). It is the tallest building in both Northern Ireland and the island of Ireland.
- The tallest structure in Belfast is the Black Mountain transmission station, servicing TV and Radio, at 228.6 m (750 ft 0 in).
- The tallest free standing and occupied structure is the Harland and Wolf shipbuilding gantry crane Samson at 106 m (348 ft).
- The tallest chimney is the Belfast City Hospital chimney at 95 m (312 ft).
- The tallest church is Belfast (St. Anne's) Cathedral at 80 m (260 ft).
- The tallest clock is the Albert Memorial Clock at 34.4 m (112 ft 10 in).

== Tallest structures ==
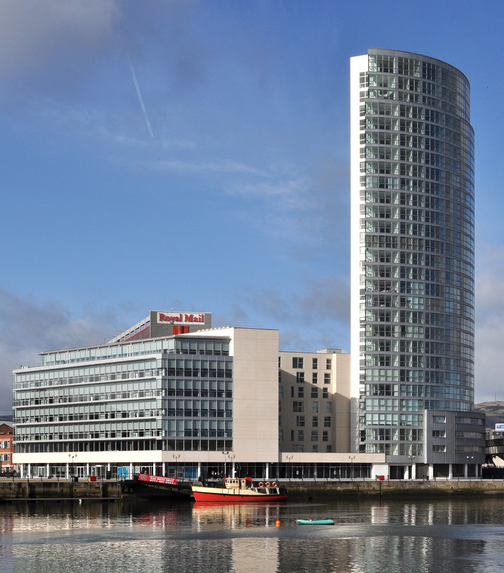
86m (282 ft) Obel Tower in Belfast is Ireland's tallest building.

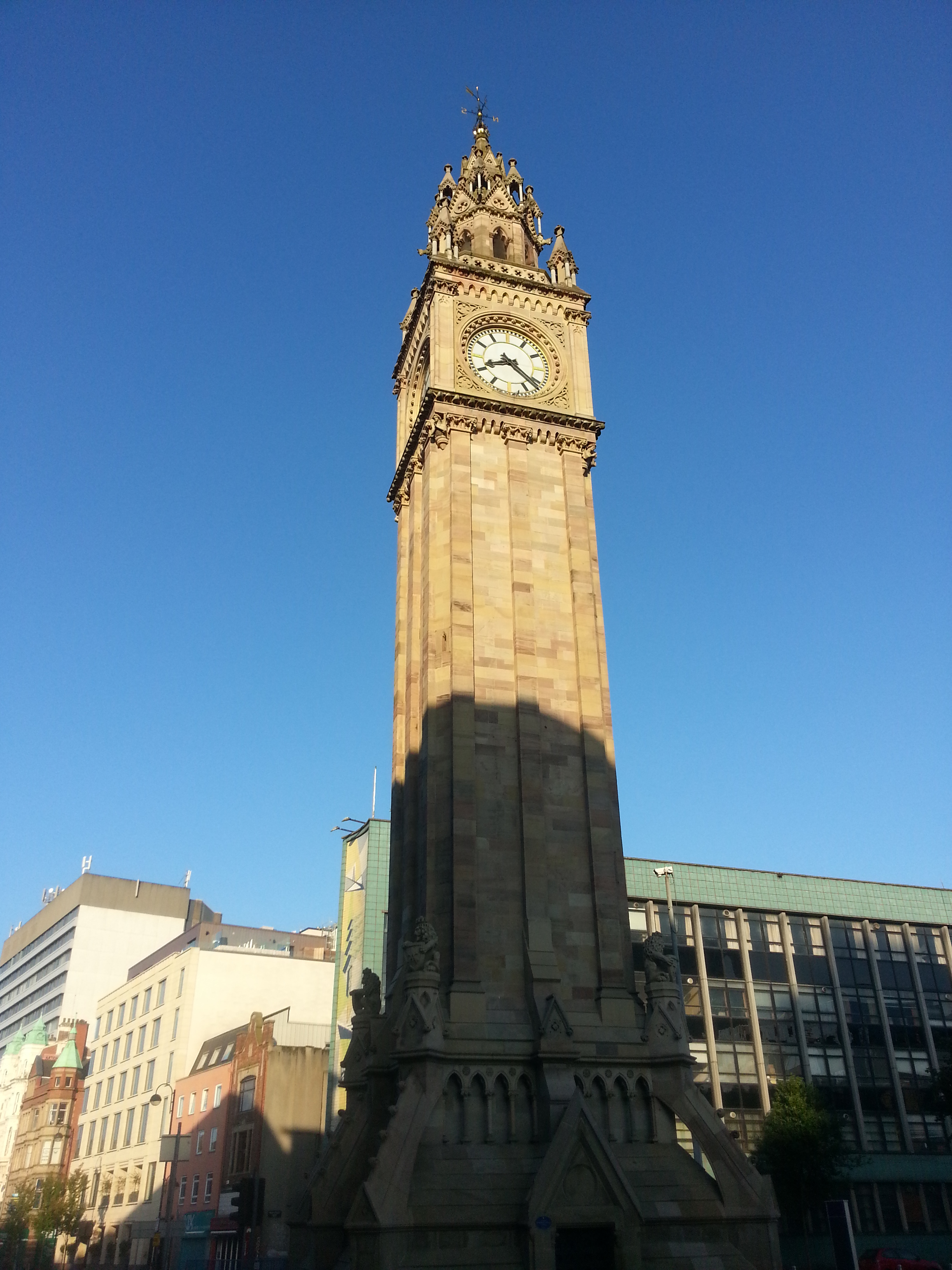
Albert Memorial Clock

These lists rank the 8 tallest structures in Belfast by total height.

Belfast Tallest Structures
Rank	Name	Use	Image	Height (m)	Height (ft)	Floors above ground	Year of completion	Notes
1	Black Mountain transmitting station	TV mast		228.6	750	N/A	1959	
2	Divis transmitting station	TV mast		166	545	N/A	2011	
4	"Samson"	Shipbuilding Gantry Crane		106	348	N/A	1974	
5	Belfast Ship repair Quay crane	Ship repair Crane		104	341	N/A	unknown	
6	"Goliath"	Shipbuilding Gantry Crane		96	316	N/A	1969	
7	Belfast City Hospital Chimney	Chimney		95	312	N/A	1986	
8	Grand Central Hotel	Hotel		93	305	23	1975	The building portion of the hotel is only 80 metres tall, while the structural element reaches a height of 93 metres.
9	Obel	Residential		86	281	28	2010	
10	St Anne's Cathedral (Church of Ireland)	Church		80	262	N/A	2007	

== Tallest buildings ==
This list ranks buildings in Belfast that stand at least 200 m (656 ft) tall, based on standard height measurement. This includes spires and architectural details but does not include antenna masts.

Belfast tallest Buildings
Rank	Name	Use	Image	Height (m)	Height (ft)	Floors (above ground)	Year of completion	Notes
1	Obel	Residential		86	282	28	2010	
2	Grand Central Hotel	Hotel		80	262	23	1975	The building portion of the hotel is only 80 metres tall, while the structural element reaches a height of 93 metres.
3	Belfast City Hospital Tower	Hospital		76	249	15	1986	
4	City Quays 3	Office		74	243	16	2021 (topped out)	
5	The Ewart	Office		73 (Note: Note: This building height is incorrectly listed as 62m in both planning applications and in Emporis, but that is the height of the lower roof/arm of building (easy mistake from side elevation) but ignores the last 3 floors, to the upper roof (not a plant), real height is seen in plan documents already cited.)	240	17	2021 (topped out)	(Nicknamed "R2D2" for the Star Wars droid)
6	Belfast International Hilton Hotel	Hotel		63	207	16	1998	
7	BT Riverside Tower	Office		62	203	14	1998	
8	Divis Tower	Residential		61	200	20	1966	
9=	The Boat	Office/Residential		57	187	15	2010	(Note: Recent applications, including the corporation street apartments and queens quay masterplan (see below with citations) have height as 57m not 62m assuming similar error with critical care building, by taking height above sea level as full height (cited in table).)
9=	Royal Victoria Hospital Critical Care Building	Hospital		57	187	12	2012	(Note: New children's hospital application reveals original height was only above sea level not base to roof so 63m is height above sea level)
11=	Linum Chambers Bedford Square	Office		55	180	13	2005	
11=	Causeway Tower	Office		55	180	13	2004	
11=	Great Northern Tower	Office		55	180	13	1992	
14	Ulster University Belfast Campus	University		52 (Note: Height above sea level once again being quoted as height (56m) but base to top it is 52m)	171	13	2021	
15	Grainne House	Residential		52	171	17	1968	
16	Europa Hotel	Hotel		51	167	13	1971	
17=	Bruce Street Student accommodation	Student accommodation		51	167	15	2023	
17=	Lanyon Plaza	Office		50	164	12	2014	
19=	Bedford House	Office		49	161	12	1966	
19=	River House	Office		49	161	14	1970 Building reclad in 2018.	
19=	Ferndale House Parkdale House Riverdale House	Residential		49	161	15	1965	
19=	Coolemoyne House Rathmoyne House	Residential		49	161	15	1962	
26	Queen's University Medical Biology Centre (MBC)	University		48	158	12	1969	
27	Swanston House 41-49 Queen street	Residential (student)		47	155	14	2016	
28=	14 Great Victoria Street	Office		46	151	11	2003	
28=	Fanum House	Office		46	151	13	1965	
28=	Dundonald house	Office		46	151	12	early 1960s	
28=	Ashby Building	University		46	151	11	1965	
28=	101 York Street	Residential (student)		46	151	14	2021 (topped out)	
33=	Kilbroney House	Residential		45	148	15	1967	
33=	Carnet House	Residential		45	148	15	1966	
33=	Bradbury court	Residential		45	148	15	Early 1960s	
33=	FX, 14-18 Montgomery street	Residential		45	148	15	2019	
33=	Maldron hotel	Hotel		45	148	15	2018	
33=	Elms BT2, McClintock Street	Residential (student)		45	148	16	2018	

== Tallest non-habitable buildings ==
List of tallest non Habitable buildings over 45m tall in Belfast. Non-Habitable building refers to a building where most of the height is taken up by an architectural feature which is not habitable such as a spire, or storage space.

Rank	Name	Use	Image	Height (m)	Height (ft)	Year of Construction	Notes
1	St Anne's Cathedral	Anglican Cathedral (Church of Ireland)		80	262	2007	
2	St Patrick's Church, Belfast	Roman Catholic chapel		55	180	1877	
3	West Twin Silos	Warehouse		54	177	1963	
4	Belfast City Hall	Government Building		53	174	1906	
5	Carlisle Memorial Church	Former Methodist Church now a venue		52	171	1875	
6	St Peter's Cathedral, Belfast	Roman Catholic Cathedral		50	164	1866	

== Tallest demolished ==
Tallest buildings and structures in Belfast over 45m to have been demolished.

Name	Use	Image	Height (m)	Floors	Notes
Divis Transmitting station (old)	TV Masts		Mast A =140.7 and Mast B=139.5	N/A	Built in 1957 Replaced in 2011
Power station West 3 Chimneys	Power station Chimneys		80	N/A	Was opened in 1962, and closed in 2002 as move towards green energy began. Chimneys were demolished in 2007.
Churchill House	Office		66 (not including mast)	18	When built in 1966 it was Belfast's tallest building. Was occupied by Northern Ireland civil servants. Demolished in 2004. Now Victoria Square Shopping centre is where it once stood.
Greeves' (Cupar street) mill chimney	Chimney		66	N/A	When built it was the tallest chimney in Ireland and was until at least 1923. It had to be felled for safety reasons as it quickly deteriorated.
Belfast Wheel	Observation wheel		60	N/A	Was opened 2007 and closed 2010, due to blocking listed Belfast City hall and titanic memorial. Talks of moving it to the Titanic quarter led to nothing.

== Potential tall buildings in Belfast ==
Section covers buildings and structures under construction, had planning permission approved and have been proposed for Belfast. Exact heights stated in this section are taken directly from building plans found at and most recent approvals are announced online, where older ones are found in the previous reference.

=== Under construction ===
This lists buildings that are currently under construction.

Name	Image	Use	Height (m)	Floors	Notes
Royal Victoria children's Hospital	*Add when crane erected any cgi image will likely be removed due to copyright	Hospital	61 (65 structure)	12	Demolition of Bostock House (site location) underway.
Bankmore square		Office and Student Accommodation	58 and 56	14 and 17	Under construction Approved 16/04/24 Construction due Sept 24 with completion in 2026 for office and 2027 for student accommodation. Redesign of previously approved proposal with smaller footprint and similar height. Area now temporary trade market and events space. Two new Pans Full application for office Full application for student accom
Loftlines	add pic when crane up	btr and social housing	57 max also 45	18 max also 14	construction started 26/06/2023 link to planning app Planning ref:LA04/2021/2280/F

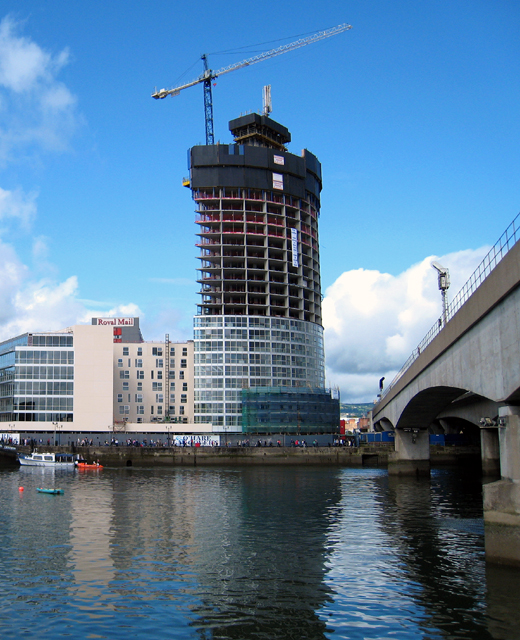
Belfast's current tallest building the Obel Tower under construction with the tallest flat tower crane ever erected in the city at 106m tall.

=== Approved ===
This lists buildings that have been given planning permission to be constructed in Belfast.

Name	Use	Height (m)	Floors	Notes
City Quay 4	Residential	76.4 (79.4m plant if measured same way as capital dock this would be official height)	23	Belfast Harbour proposal in 2019 PAN submitted September 2022 Planning ref:LA04/2022/1752/PAN Full application submitted LA04/2023/2388/F with confirmed planned height in documents recommended for approval in Dec 2023 planning meeting, height slightly increased and full planned height confirmed. Approved in Jan 16 2024 planning meeting
Royal Victoria Hospital energy centre	Power station	70 (Flue chimney stack)	N/A	Granted planning permission in Belfast City council's 14/12/21 planning meeting This will not be a 'habitable building' but a prominent structure. Planning ref: LA04/2021/1492/F.
39 Corporation Street	Student accommodation	67	20	proposed in 2024 and full planning documents uploaded in 2025 approved June 2025 planning committee
21-29 Corporation street	Mixed use	63	19	Proposed in 2018, pre planning accepted, renders of design produced by developer Macleer and Rushe in 2020. Formal planning application imminent. Note site has previous applications up to 20 stories accepted planning permission including offices and 250 bedroom hotel but nothing has come of it yet with site still derelict. Full Planning application submitted August 2021 Planning ref LA04/2021/2016/F. was approved in Jan 16th 2024 planning meeting
Sirroco waterside quays office	Office	58.3	13	Approved 2020 Planning ref: LA04/2018/0448/F.
The Residence	Residential	57.5	19	Approved in November 2020 planning meeting. Site has been put up for sale in 2021. Planning ref:LA04/2019/2387/F.
Lanyon View Dalton street	Residential	56.7	17	Approved 2019 and again in 2021 after dispute. Planning ref: LA04/2018/2649/F.
Belfast Harbour 480 mW gas power station	Power station	54.2	N/A	Approved 2019 Not a 'habitable building' but a prominent structure. Planning ref: LA04/2017/0878/F.
River Walk	Residential	54	17	Approved 2020 Planning ref: 2019/0517/F.
81-87 Academy street	Residential	54	16	Approved 2019 Land bought by Tribeca Developers 2021 Reapproved 24/11/2021. Planning ref: LA04/2019/2257/F.
City Quays 5	Mixed Use	48.5	10	full planning submitted Dec 20 2023 Approved 27/06/2024
Bedford yard	Aparthotel	45	13	Approved 2020 and again in 2021 after dispute. Planning ref: LA04/2020/0659/F.
Dorchester House	apart hotel	45	12	reclad change of use and two storey extension of existing office building. Approved 18/06/2024

== List of unbuilt buildings ==
Table of tallest proposed buildings that never came to fruition, either due to planning permission or financial issues.

Name	Height (m)	Floors	Notes
Aurora building	109	37	Site currently a petrol station, planning was refused mainly due to precarious financial state of developer and opposition to building height.
Bedford Square phase 2 (original application)	104.5	26	Gained planning approval in 2005 but plans were scaled down after property market crash in 2008. A 17 storey office is currently under construction on its proposed site.
Belfast Vetro Hotel	100	26	
54 Pilot Street	97.5	30	Now 19 storey building proposed on same site
Sirocco Quay	92	30	Had outline planning permission but was changed into a 17 storey office development city quays 3 which is currently under construction
Queen's Quay block E1	92	30	Land bought by another developer creating their own masterplan.
Royal Exchange Tower	91	26	Now Tribeca masterplan with shorter buildings to protect listed buildings from being dominated,
Odyssey quays tower	88	29	previous withdrawn proposal, there is currently a 28 storey tower proposed on the same site.
Murray Tobacco works	84.5	28	Majority of site was bought by Translink who are using it as part of a mixed use development around their transport hub called Weaver's Cross. There is preplanning discussions for a 17 floor residential tower in the remaining land.
Midland Building	76	25	site is now student accommodation
St George's Gate	76	24	Application withdrawn, still seen as a development opportunity site
Hope and History	70	21	Proposed in 2005, planning refused.
Brunswick Street tower	70	17	Planning was approved, land is being used for Mcclintock street student accommodation and Maldron hotel, there is still unused land on the site.
One Grosvenor Gate	62	16	new application for 800 student accom in.
Bridge end towers	61	19	Application withdrawn, site still vacant.
Titanic Quarter Financial campus	60	12	was approved, but now site has a new proposal of purpose managed student accommodation (height as yet unknown from consultation but it did give the height of the older proposal in the info pack )
Bankmore Square	57	12	was approved, now being split into apartments and a slimmer office pans are in for both.

== History of Belfast's tallest building ==
Table of the history of the tallest building in Belfast by Architectural height

Name	Years tallest	Height (m)	Image
St. Peter's Cathedral (Roman Catholic)	1866-1875	50	
Carlisle Memorial Church (Methodist)	1875-1877	52	
St Patrick's Church (Roman Catholic)	1877-1966	55	
Churchill House	1966-1975	66	
Windsor House (Grand Central Hotel)	1st 1975-2007 Joint 1st 2007-2010	80	
Belfast (St. Anne's) Cathedral (Church of Ireland)	Joint 1st 2007-2010	80	
Obel Tower	2010-	86	

== See also ==
- List of tallest structures in Ireland
- List of tallest buildings and structures in Dublin
