= The Elysian =

Mixed-use building in Cork, Ireland

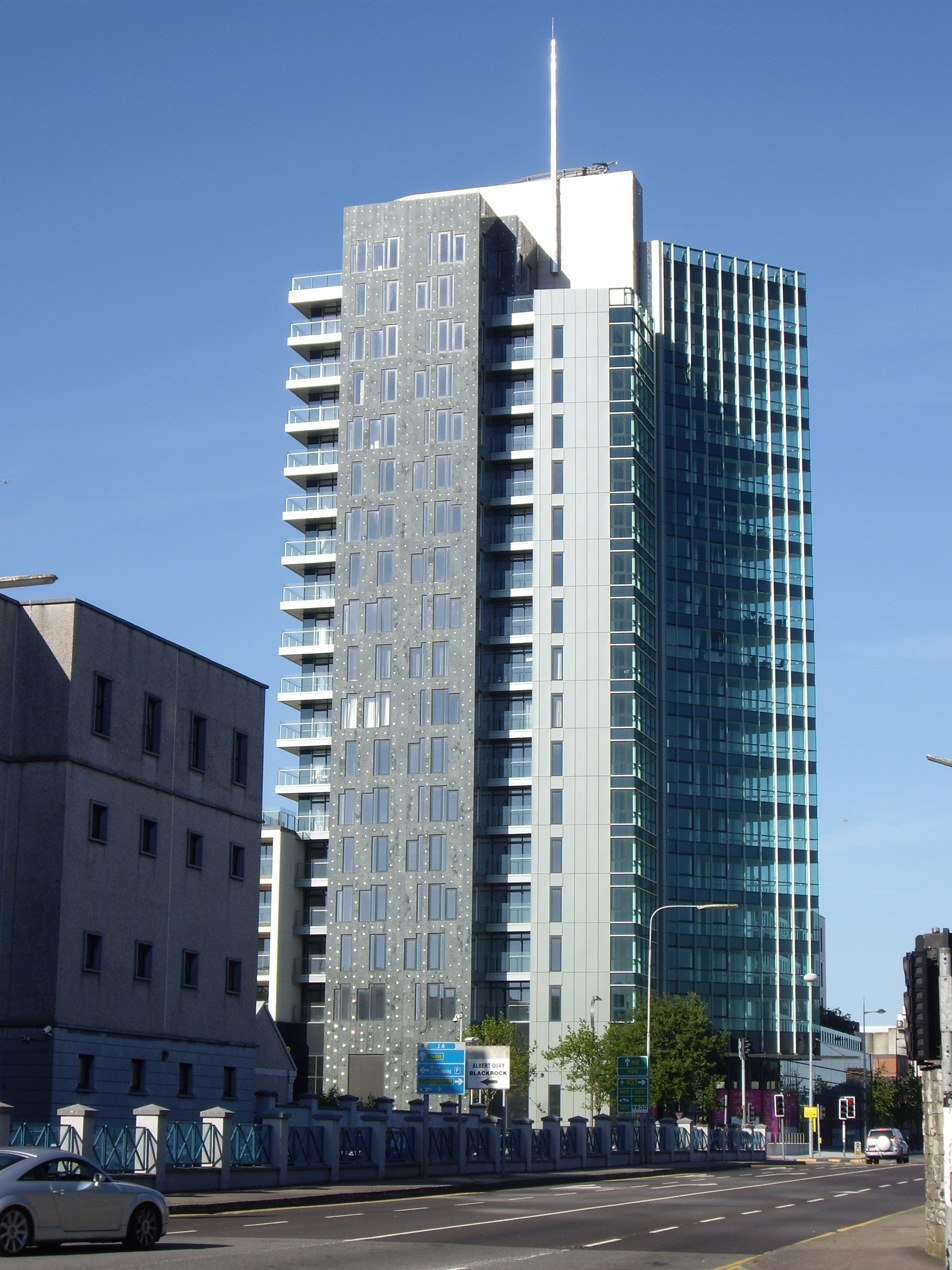
- The Elysian tower, June 2009

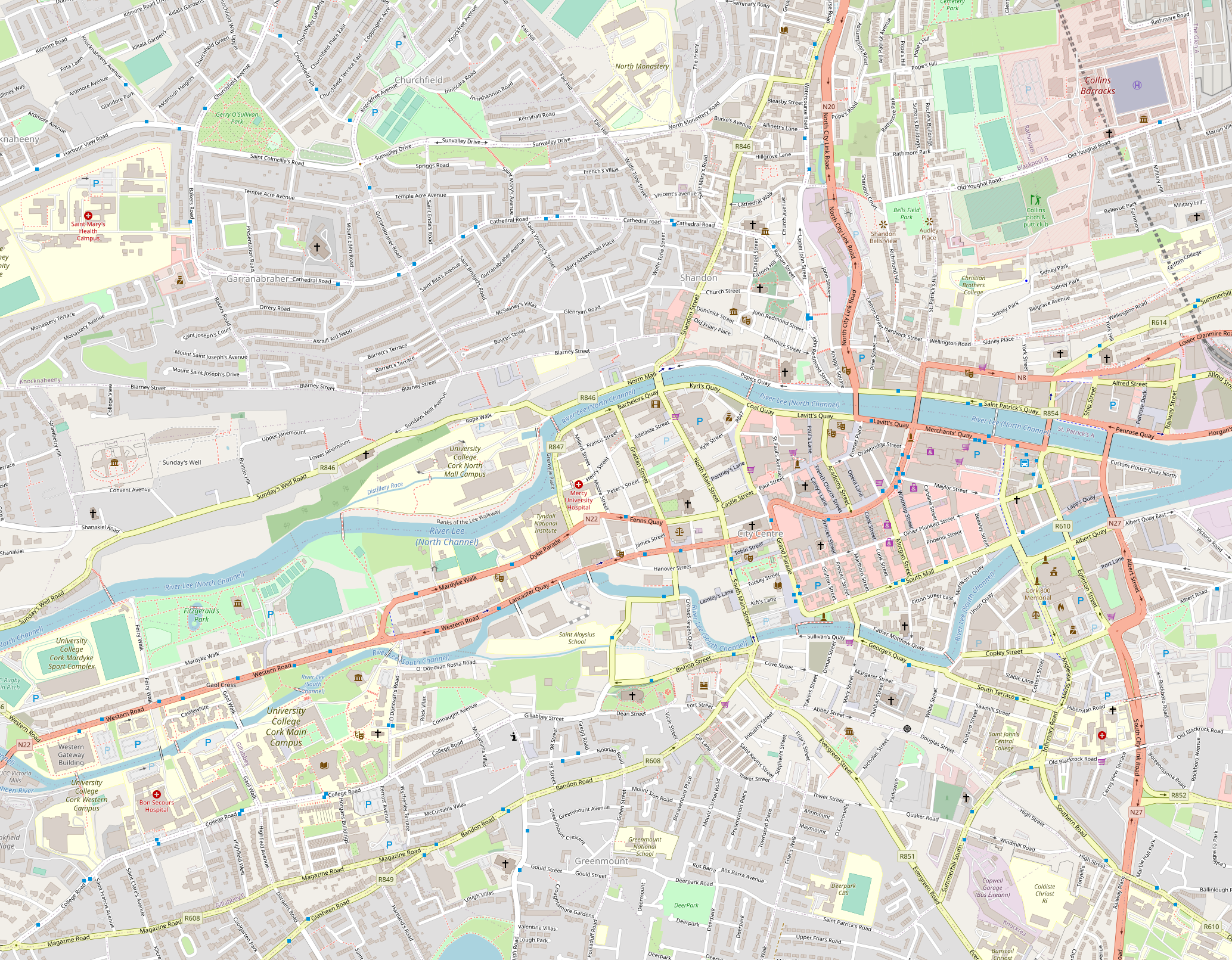
- Location within Cork Central

General information
- Type: Office, residence
- Location: Eglinton Street, Cork, Ireland
- Coordinates: 51.896676°N 8.463367°W
- Completed: 2008

Height
- Antenna spire: 80.7 metres (265 ft)
- Roof: 69.7 metres (229 ft)
- Top floor: 59.9 metres (197 ft)

Technical details
- Floor count: 18 (with two basement garages)

Website
- www.theelysian.ie

The Elysian is a mixed-use Celtic Tiger-era building at Eglinton Street in Cork, Ireland. Construction of the building was completed in early September 2008. When built it was the tallest building in the Republic of Ireland. It was overtaken by Capital Dock in the Dublin Docklands in 2018. It now stands as the third tallest building in the Republic of Ireland and tallest in Cork.

== Site description ==
It consists of a number of connected 6-8 storey buildings, with a 17-storey tower on the southwest corner of the site. The tower is 69.7 metres (229 ft) to the top of the roof, making it the third tallest storeyed building in the Republic of Ireland. The complex includes an enclosed Japanese garden and a two-level basement garage.

== Development ==
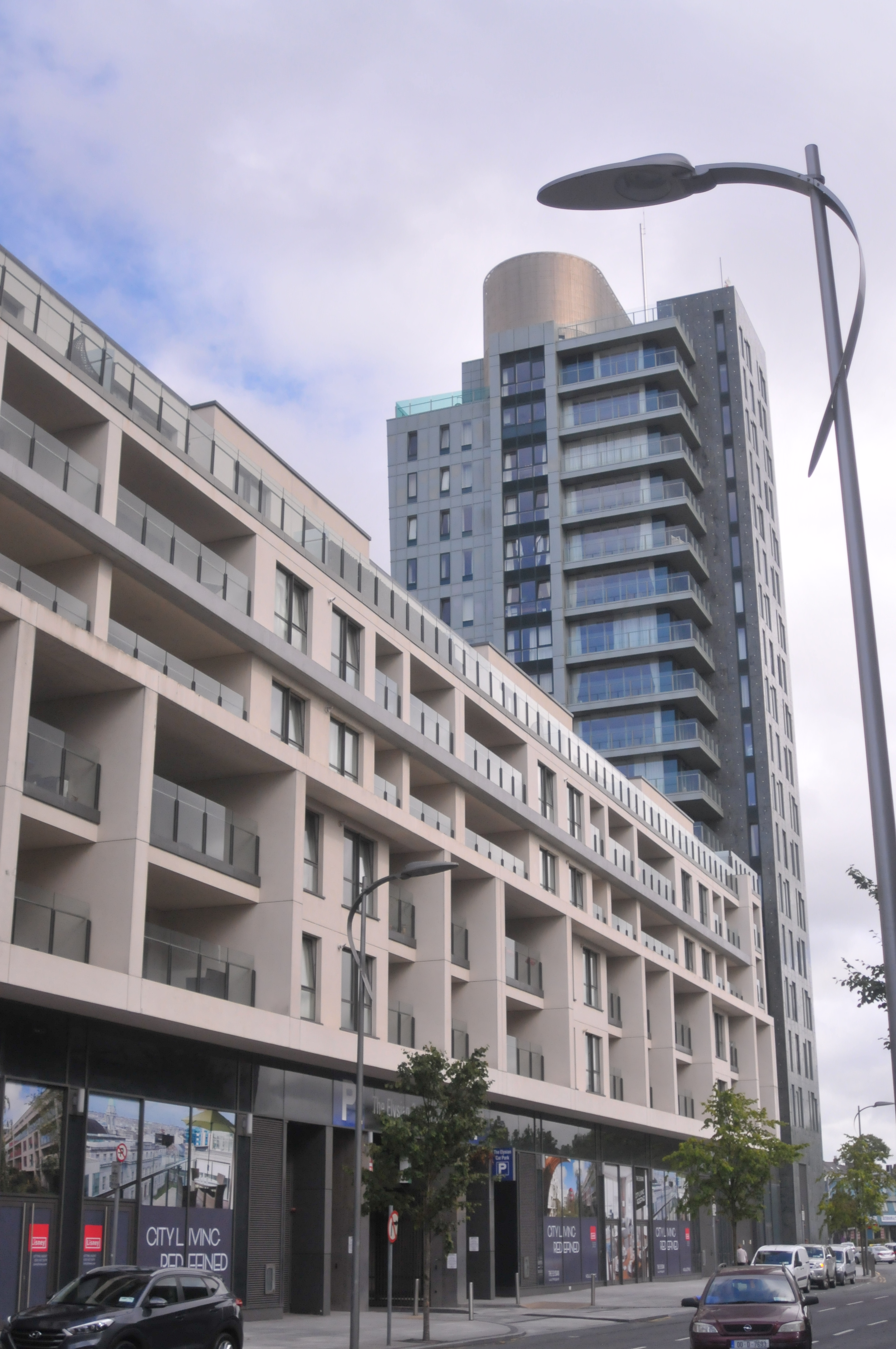
The Elysian in 2017 viewed from Eglinton Street

The building opened during an economic crisis in Ireland and by late April 2009, 80% of the 211 apartments remained unsold and 50% of the commercial units were vacant. As of October 2009 this situation continued, earning the building the nickname "The Idle Tower", a pun on a nearby hostelry known as The Idle Hour. An article in The Irish Times newspaper described the Elysian as a "Mary Celeste adrift in the recession." Mandatory annual management fees for an apartment in the Elysian are €4,000 per year. In January 2010, developer O'Flynn Construction's debts of €1.8bn were acquired by the National Asset Management Agency, which bundled them as "Project Tower" and sold them for €1.1bn in May 2014 to Carbon Finance, a subsidiary of The Blackstone Group.

In December 2014, an Aldi supermarket opened on the ground floor. A dispute between O'Flynn and Carbon on repayments was settled in February 2015, with Carbon retaining ownership of the Elysian. By May 2017, 180 of the 211 apartments available were let, with works ongoing to furnish the remaining 31 apartments. As of 2017, it was announced that all apartments in the building were fully let. In April 2018, Blackstone sold the complex to Kennedy Wilson for a reported €87.5 million.

== See also ==
- Riverpoint
- George's Quay Plaza
- List of tallest buildings in Ireland
