= Windsor House (Belfast) =

High-rise building in Belfast, Northern Ireland

Coordinates: 54.595°N 5.932°W

Windsor House (officially known as 9-15 Bedford Street) was a 23-story, 80 m high-rise building on Bedford Street in Belfast, Northern Ireland. The building was the tallest storeyed building in Northern Ireland before being surpassed by the Obel Tower (also in Belfast) which stands at 85 metres (279 feet) tall, with 28 floors. The total structural height was actually taller than the Obel, if you include the two plant floors and radio mast it stood at 93m(305ft) tall.

Constructed in 1974 as an office building, Windsor House had a tall green elevator shaft and green side wall facade, as well as satellite and aerial masts, which stood a further seven metres in the air.

The building was badly damaged in an IRA bombing in 1992. It was sold for £30m in 2006 to County Cavan building firm P Elliot. In March 2007 plans were made to convert the building into a block of flats. However, the conversion plans fell through.

In May 2015, Hastings Hotel Group, an NI-based hospitality company, purchased the building for £6.5m. A planning application was submitted on 23 June 2015, proposing refurbishment, partial demolition and rebuilding, extension and change of use of Windsor House for a hotel (304 bedrooms) with associated restaurant and bar facilities (on ground to 15th floor) and 18 serviced hotel apartments on the 16 and the 17th floors; creation of new retail unit on ground floor overlooking Franklin Street; retention and refurbishment and extension of office use (25,000 ft2) on upper floors (18th to 22nd floor). The planning application was approved 20 October 2015 and redevelopment work commenced in July 2016. Following a £30m refurbishment, the new hotel opened in 2018 as the Grand Central Hotel.

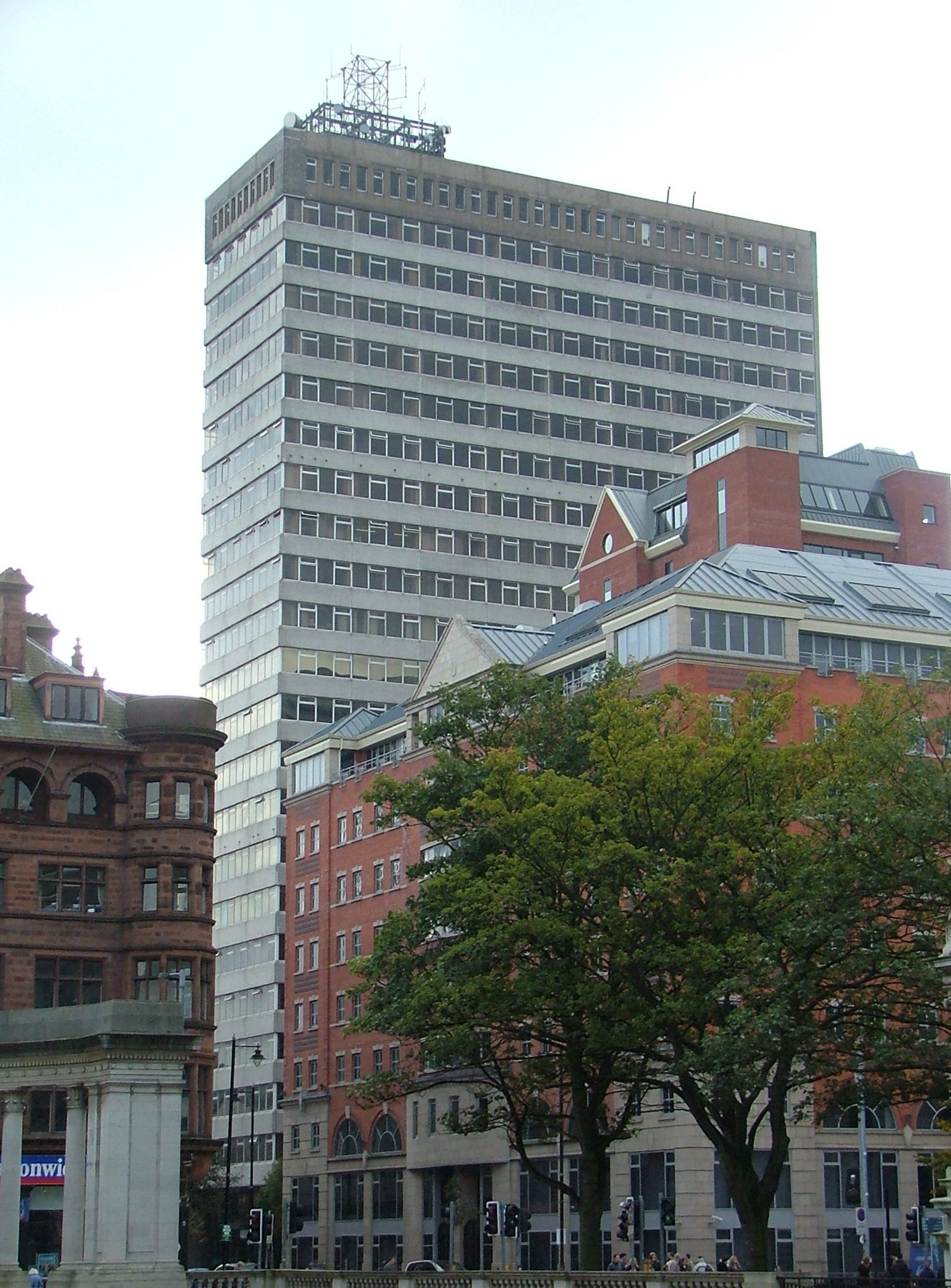
Windsor House in 2006

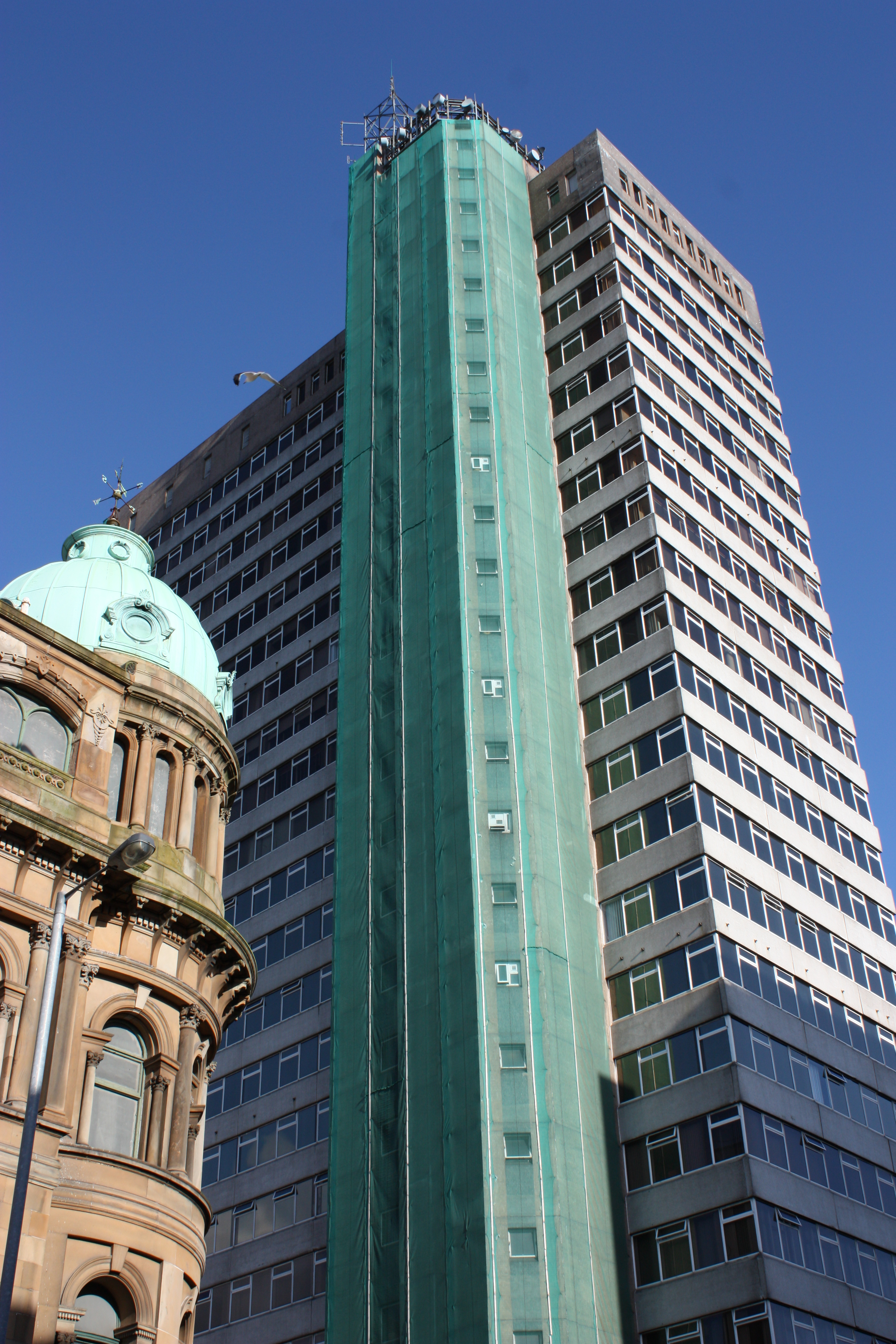
Windsor House in May 2010

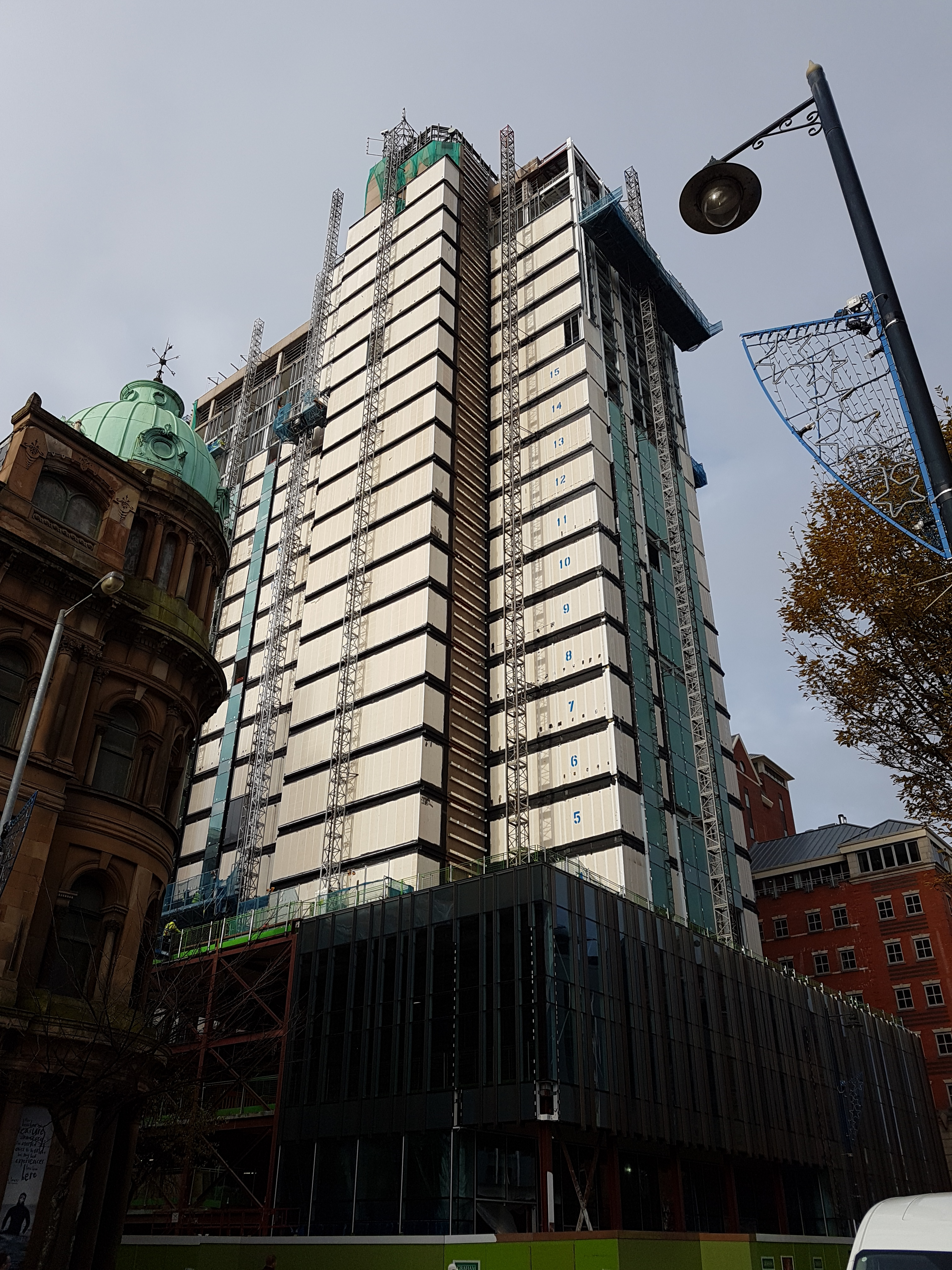
Windsor House refurbishment

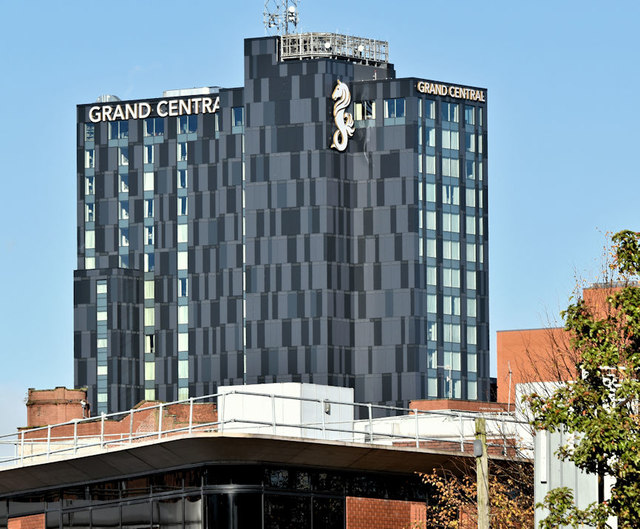
The Grand Central Hotel after refurbishment, 2018

== See also ==
- List of tallest buildings and structures in Belfast
- Architecture of Belfast
