= Riverpoint =

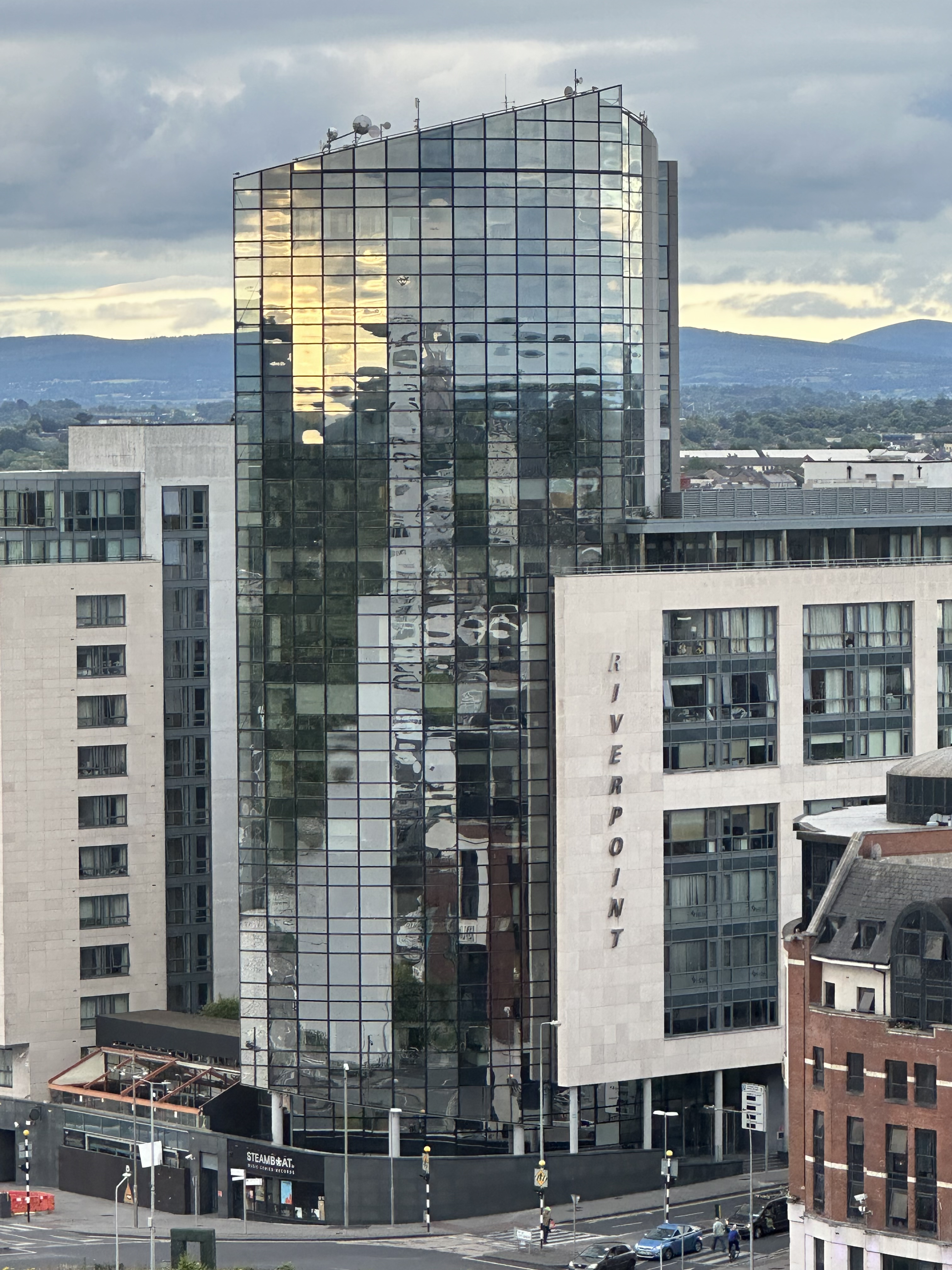
- The Riverpoint Complex seen from the Clayton Hotel Limerick. The building to the left is Tower 2, and the building to the right is Tower 1.

General information
- Type: Residential and Office
- Location: Limerick, Ireland
- Coordinates: 52.6613°N 8.6325°W
- Construction started: 2005
- Completed: 2008
- Cost: €75 million

Height
- Height: 58.52 metres

Technical details
- Floor count: 15
- Floor area: 6,210 m^{2} (66,800 sq ft)
- Lifts/elevators: 2 passenger lifts

Design and construction
- Architecture firm: Burke Kennedy Doyle

Riverpoint is a two-tower mixed-use building complex located in Limerick, Ireland. Standing at 58.52 metres (192.0 feet) it is currently the ninth-tallest storeyed building in the nation, the sixteenth-tallest on the island of Ireland and the third-tallest in Munster after the Cork County Hall and The Elysian, both in Cork. The Riverpoint tower is 1.5 m (4.9 ft) taller than the nearby Clayton Hotel, which at 57.0 m (187.0 ft) is the tallest hotel in Ireland. The Riverpoint development as a whole forms most of the block surrounded by Henry Street, Lower Mallow Street, the Bishop's Quay and Mill Lane. The only other buildings on the site are an apartment building on the corner of Lower Mallow Street and Henry Street, and Estuary House on Henry Street.

== Features ==
The complex has a restaurant, fitness centre and a 250-space underground car park along with 13 floors of offices. There are 137 apartments in total between both towers, including an office penthouse on the 14th floor.

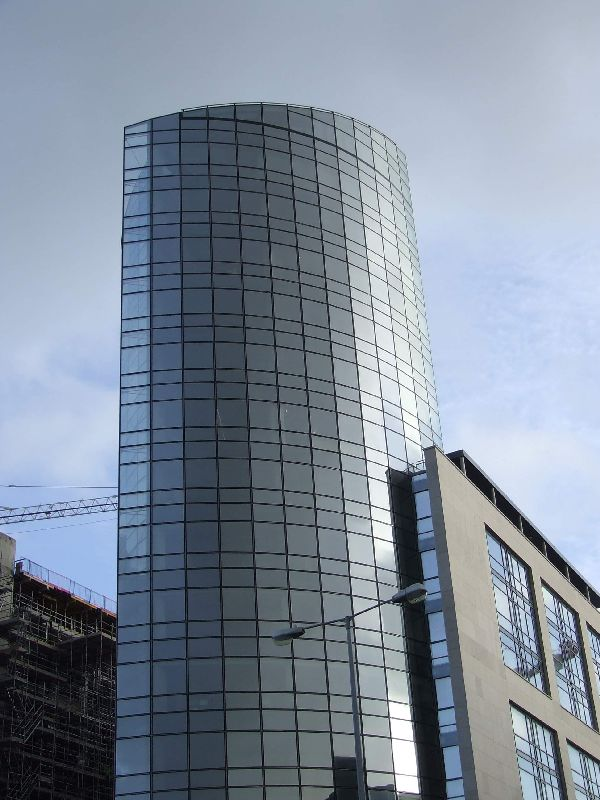
The side of tower 1, with tower 2 to the left under construction in 2007

== Location ==
It is situated on the site of St. Munchin's House, which housed the Department of Agriculture who have since moved into Riverpoint. St. Munchin's House was built in the 1960s and since then has been an eyesore and was dubbed one of the "ugliest" buildings in Limerick. The main tower of the Riverpoint complex was built alongside St. Munchin's House, with the latter being demolished as the second tower opened in 2007. The main Riverpoint tower is situated on the riverfront of Limerick city, on the corner of Lower Mallow Street and the Bishop's Quay, facing the Shannon Bridge over the River Shannon.
