= Steine of Dublin =

Former Norse standing stone in Dublin, Ireland

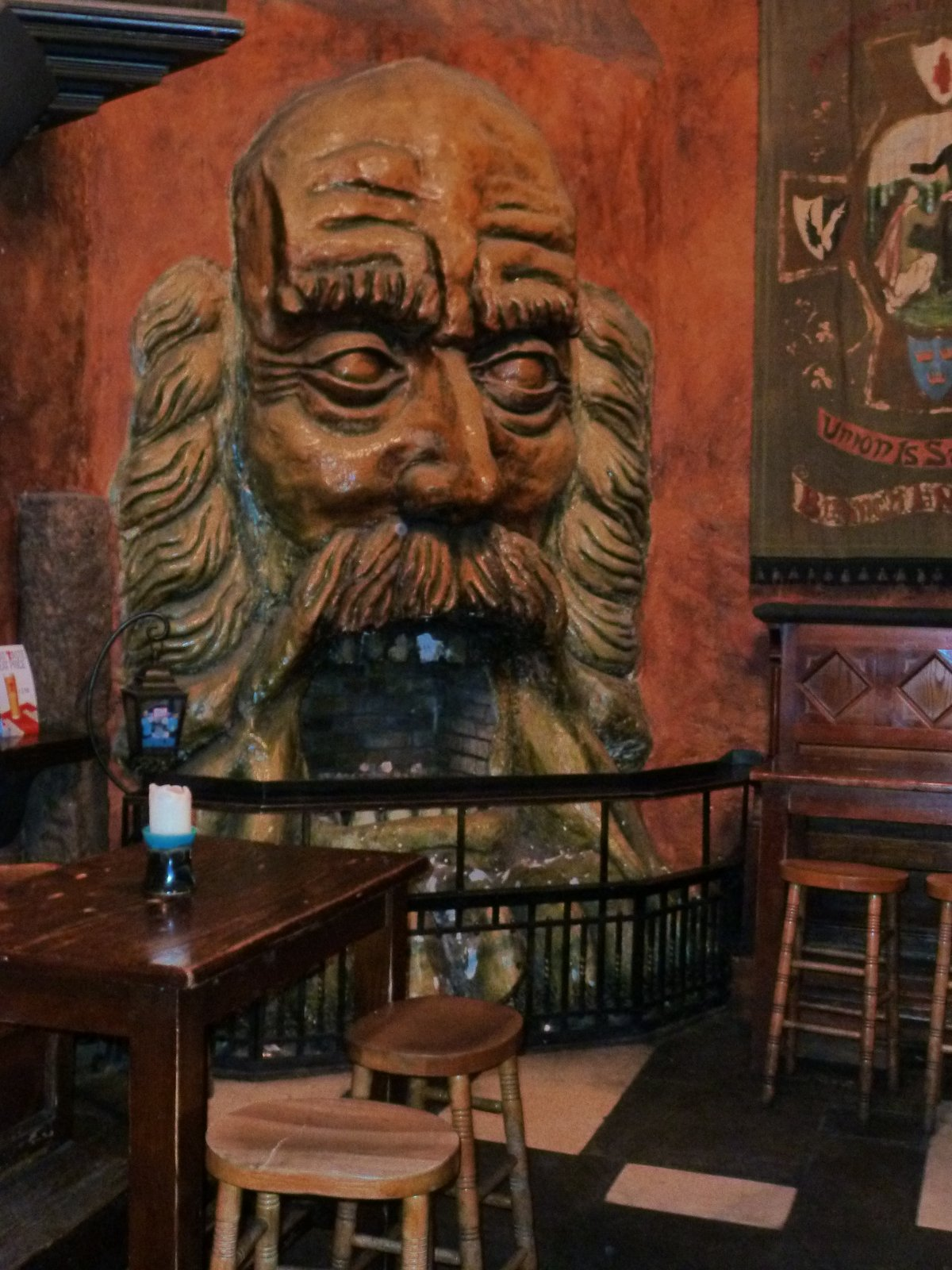
Interior of the Long Stone pub in Dublin prior to its demolition.

The Steine of Dublin was a Viking standing stone or steinn (from Old Norse - stone) which was used to mark the landing spot and point of docking for Viking longships in Dublin and signify their ownership of the surrounding lands. It was likely built soon after the Vikings' founding of Early Scandinavian Dublin in 849 AD, although a new stone may have been installed later.

The stone gave its name to the surrounding area and the nearby stein river as well as a local pub.

== History ==
The stone lay to the east of the city in an area known as Hoggen Green, Hogges Green or Hoggin Green and later referred to as Le Hogges in what is today the general vicinity of College Green, close to the old Viking Thingmote or Thingmount adjacent to what is today St Andrew's Church.

It was also located next to the Priory of All Hallows which evolved to become the site of Trinity College Dublin from 1592. In later years, the location also became the site of the Irish parliament at Chichester House from 1661 until it was reconstructed as Parliament House around 1728.

The stone was said to have been around 12 to 14 feet high. The use of the original stone is uncertain although it certainly acted as a general focal point and territory marker for the taking or retaking of Dublin. It may have also had pseudo religious or spiritual purpose. It is not clear if the stone was originally coloured as would be typical of a Viking runestone or originally contained information as with an Ogham stone or was just a general marker.

The stone was removed sometime before 1750 and it does not appear on John Rocque's 1756 map of Dublin. Its whereabouts are unknown as of 2024 although it is likely it is still extant in the general Dublin area as an architectural feature or used as a building material.

=== Steine river ===
The stone and area gave its name to a nearby stream which was referred to as either the Steine, styne or Stein. This stream had its source near Charlemont Bridge and its mouth at Burgh Quay where it joined the Liffey. As of 2024, the stream has been culverted and cannot be seen above ground.

== Replacements ==
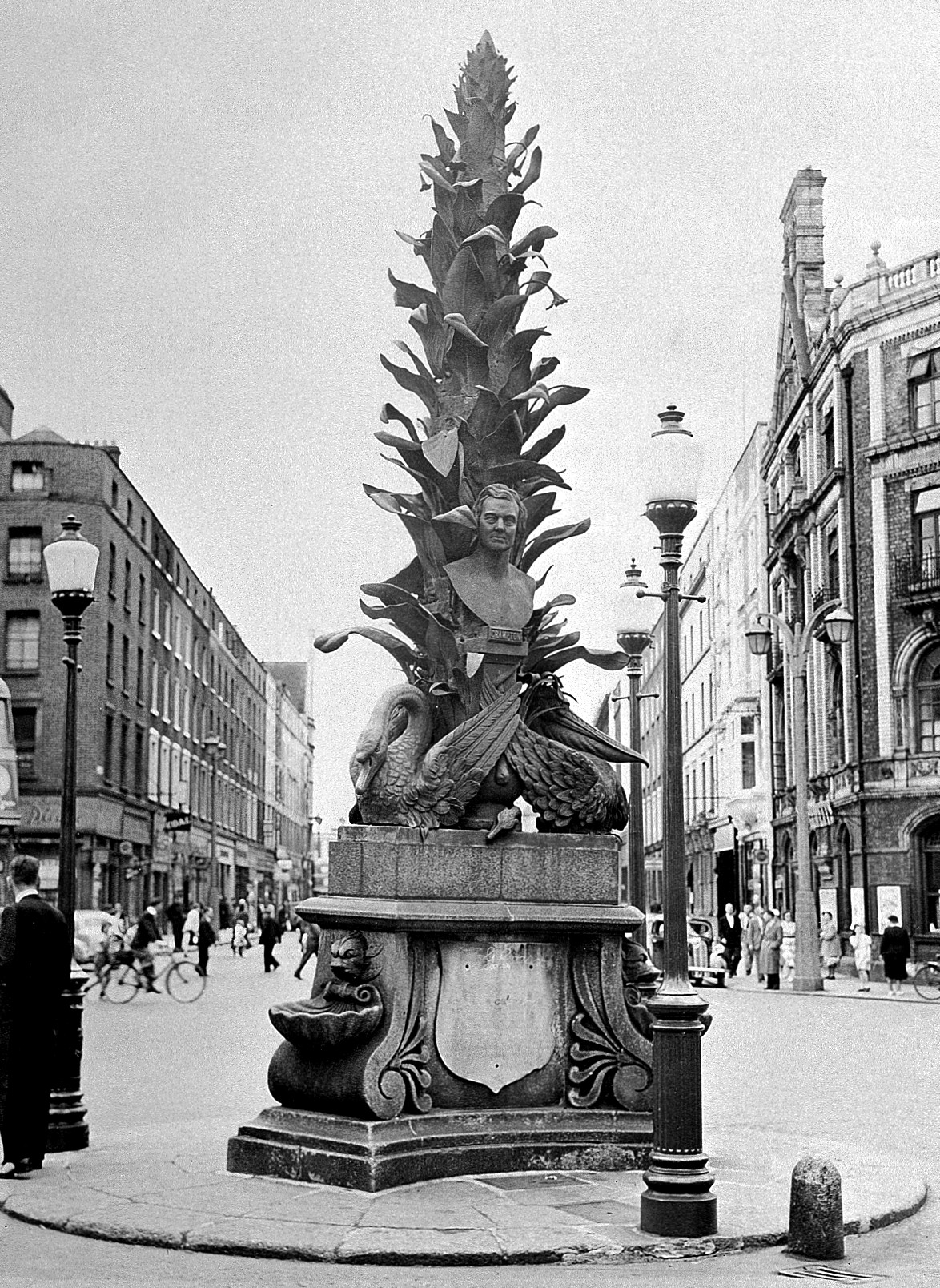
Sir Philip Crampton's memorial

A memorial sculpture to the surgeon Sir Philip Crampton by Joseph Kirk was later erected near the site in 1862 and existed until 1959 when it partially collapsed and then was destroyed as part of road widening works. The statue was sometimes referred to as "the cauliflower".

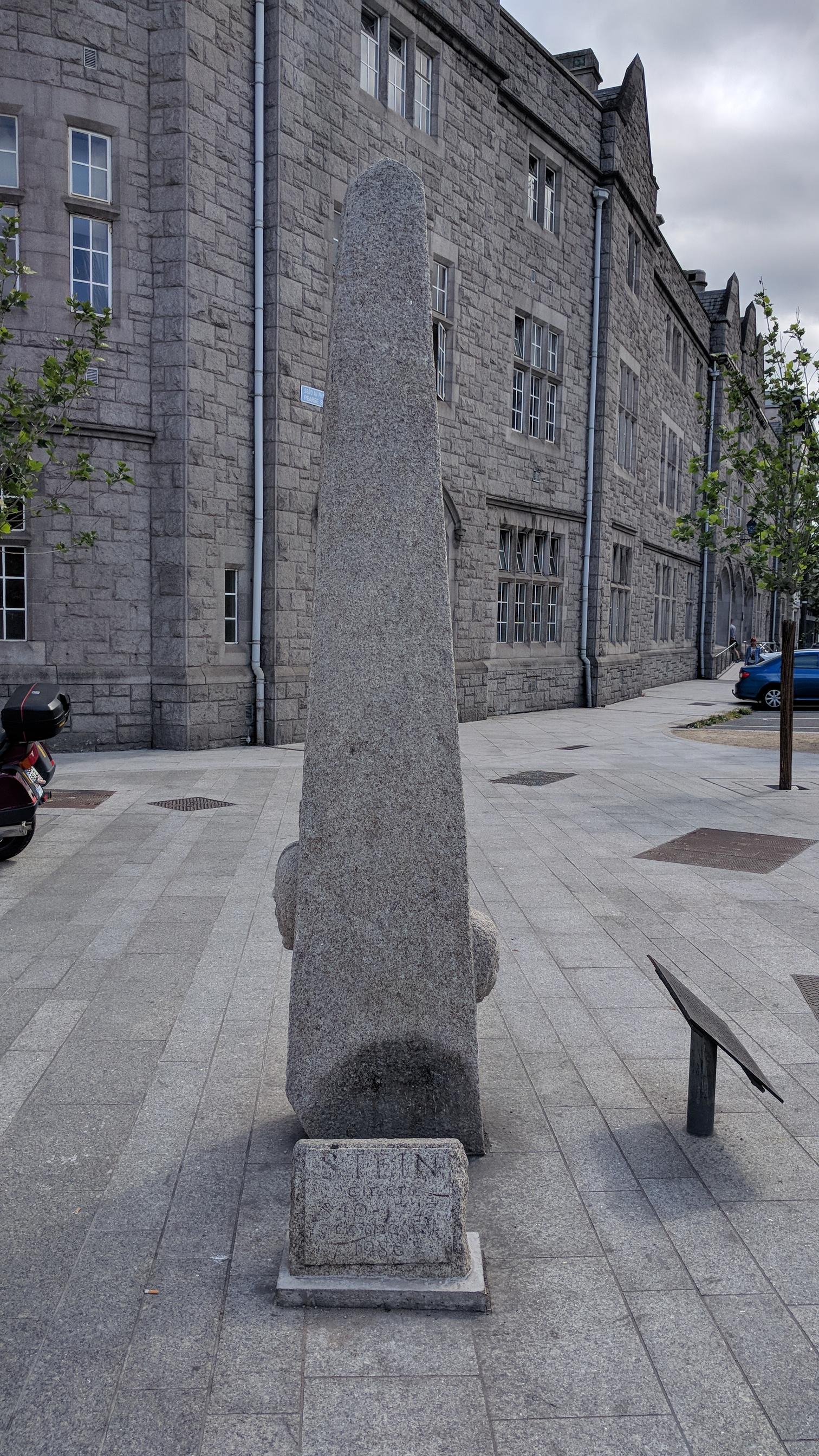
Long Stone replica

A replacement 11 foot tall stein or sculptural pillar made of granite was erected on College Street, Dublin in 1986 near the site of the Crampton Memorial. The sculpture was designed by Cliodhna Cussen. The face of Ivar the Boneless has been carved into the base of the standing stone.
