= Aurora building =

- Interactive map of the Aurora building area

General information
- Status: Planning permission refused Planning appeal withdrawn Never built
- Location: Belfast, Northern Ireland, United Kingdom
- Coordinates: 54.591873°N 5.934151°W

Height
- Roof: 109 metres (358 ft)

Technical details
- Floor count: 37

The Aurora building (also called the Aurora Tower) was a proposed construction project that was not granted planning permission. If built at the proposed height of 109 metres, 37 storeys, it would have been the tallest building on the island of Ireland. The proposed location of the Belfast tower was on the corner of Great Victoria and Ventry Street (the site formerly home to the city centre's last petrol station). Great Victoria Street also fronts other notable buildings in Belfast such as the Grand Opera House, the Europa Hotel and The Crown Liquor Saloon.

The development was proposed to contain almost 300 apartments and 7,000 square feet (700 m^{2}) of commercial space. The contractors involved in the development were McAlister Holdings, Strategic Planning and HKR Architects.

Planning permission was refused, and a subsequent appeal was withdrawn in February 2011. A receiver was appointed to the Aurora site on the instruction of Anglo Irish Bank on 27 January 2011, the same day it placed two other McAlister sites into receivership. Those two sites, at Greenhall Highway in Coleraine and Dunlady Road in Dundonald, were the property of McAlister Construction Ltd.
