= BT Riverside Tower =

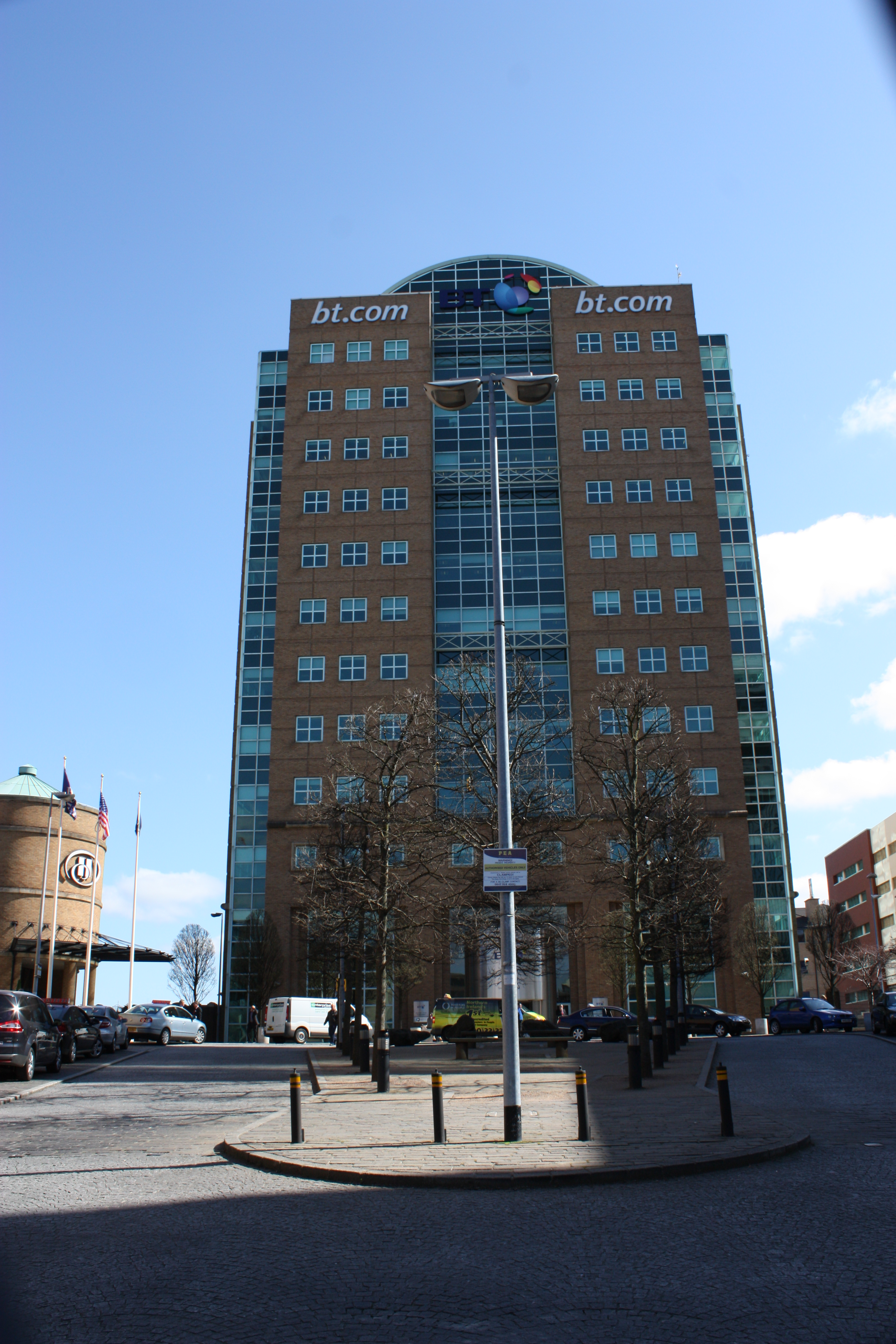

General information
- Type: Office
- Location: Belfast, Northern Ireland
- Completed: 1998

Height
- Height: 61.88 meters

Technical details
- Floor count: 13

Design and construction
- Architecture firm: WDR & RT Taggart
- Main contractor: Gilbert Ash

BT Riverside Tower was built in 1998, as a headquarters of British Telecom for Northern Ireland. The Tower is located at Lanyon Place in Belfast City Centre. It was officially opened by the Duke of Edinburgh on 11 November 1998. The building is currently the 7th tallest building in Belfast. It is located in Lanyon Place, which was one of the Laganside Corporation's redevelopment projects.

BT staff moved in to the building in late 1999 and early 2000, having previously been based at five different city centre locations. BT staff occupied all 11 floors until 2008; some floor space is now occupied by other tenants, including AXA insurance and the Regulation and Quality Improvement Authority. The building was used for filming scenes of the BBC drama Line of Duty.

Under BT Group's "Better Workplace Programme", Riverside Tower was selected as one of the company's key regional hubs, returning the building entirely to BT use. The remaining sub-tenants moved out in late 2022, with AXA Insurance relocating to The Ewart on Bedford Square. Following a major refurbishment by GRAHAM Group, the building was reopened on 2 March 2023 by Northern Ireland Secretary Chris Heaton-Harris to house roughly 2,000 staff from BT, EE, and Openreach.

== See also ==
- List of tallest buildings and structures in Belfast
- List of tallest structures in Ireland
