= Obel Tower =

Highrise building in Belfast, Northern Ireland

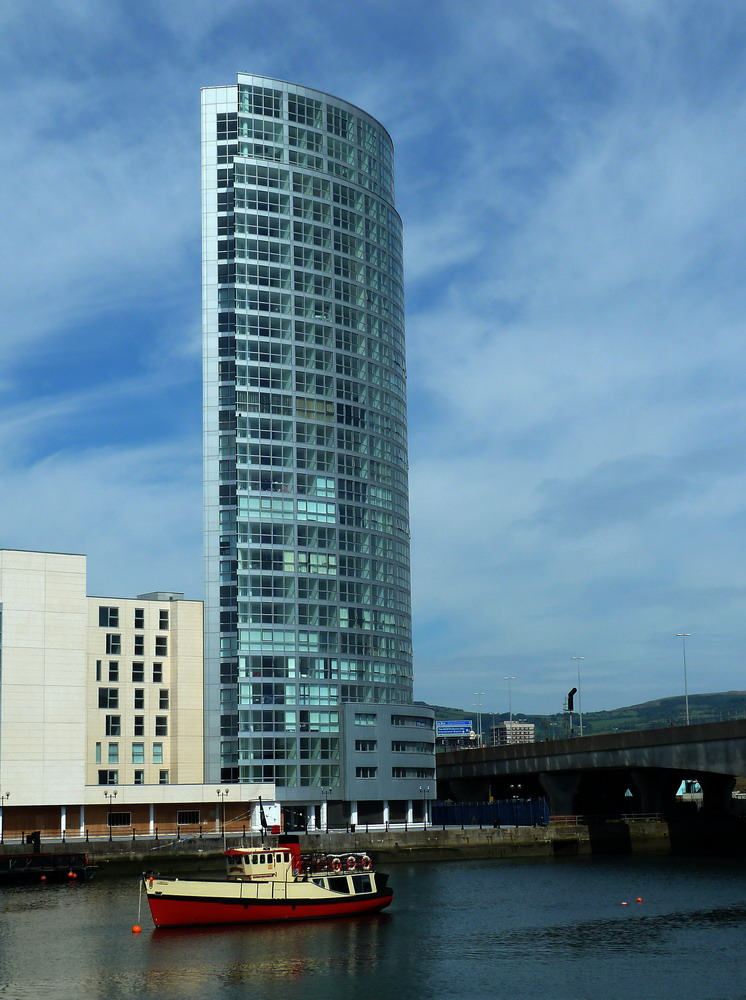
- Obel Tower, Belfast pictured in 2012

General information
- Status: Completed
- Type: Residential
- Location: Donegall Quay, Belfast, Northern Ireland, United Kingdom
- Coordinates: 54.602°N 5.922°W
- Construction started: 2006
- Completed: 2011
- Cost: £60 million

Height
- Roof: 85 m (279 ft)

Technical details
- Floor count: 27

Design and construction
- Architects: Broadway Malyan and Chris Marshall

The Obel Tower is a highrise building in Belfast, Northern Ireland, located on Donegall Quay on the River Lagan beside the Lagan Weir. Measuring 85 metres (279 ft) in height, the tower is the tallest storeyed building in Ireland, dominating the Belfast skyline. On completion it overtook the previous tallest building in Belfast and Northern Ireland, Windsor House (80 m).

== History ==
Obel Tower was developed by the Karl Group at a cost of £60 million. Its name derives from "obelisk" and "old Belfast".

The tower contains 233 apartments. The first 182 apartments released in March 2005, priced from £100,000 to £475,000, were reserved off plan within 48 hours.

Construction work on phase one of the project, the foundations and 2 storey basement carpark, began in January 2006. In mid-2007 construction work on the site ceased, and all of the construction equipment was removed; construction then recommenced on 17 June 2008.

Planning permission was granted in January 2008 for an extra two floors to be added to the tower to cater for further demand in apartment space. The anticipated completion date was originally summer 2010; however, owing to the construction moratorium the building was not completed until spring 2011. These extra floors brought the overall height up from 80.5 metres to 85 metres.

In April 2011 it was announced that London law firm Allen & Overy was to rent all of the available office space at the Obel.

In October 2011 local catering firm Mount Charles opened its second 'Fed and Watered' branded cafe in one of the retail units on the ground floor.

On Friday 30 November 2012 administrators were appointed to Obel Ltd, Obel Offices Ltd and Donegall Quay Ltd. The three firms control the residential complex. According to the BBC, the main firm, Donegall Quay, is unable to pay debts to the former Bank of Scotland Ireland (BoSI) — believed to be more than £51m.

New York based Marathon Asset Management acquired the Obel development for more than £20m during 2014.

Obel 62 (the tower) received a £2m refurbishment during 2016. The work included refurbishment of communal areas and installation of a window insulation film by Solartek Films Ltd.

== See also ==
- List of tallest buildings and structures in Belfast
- List of tallest buildings in Ireland

== Gallery ==
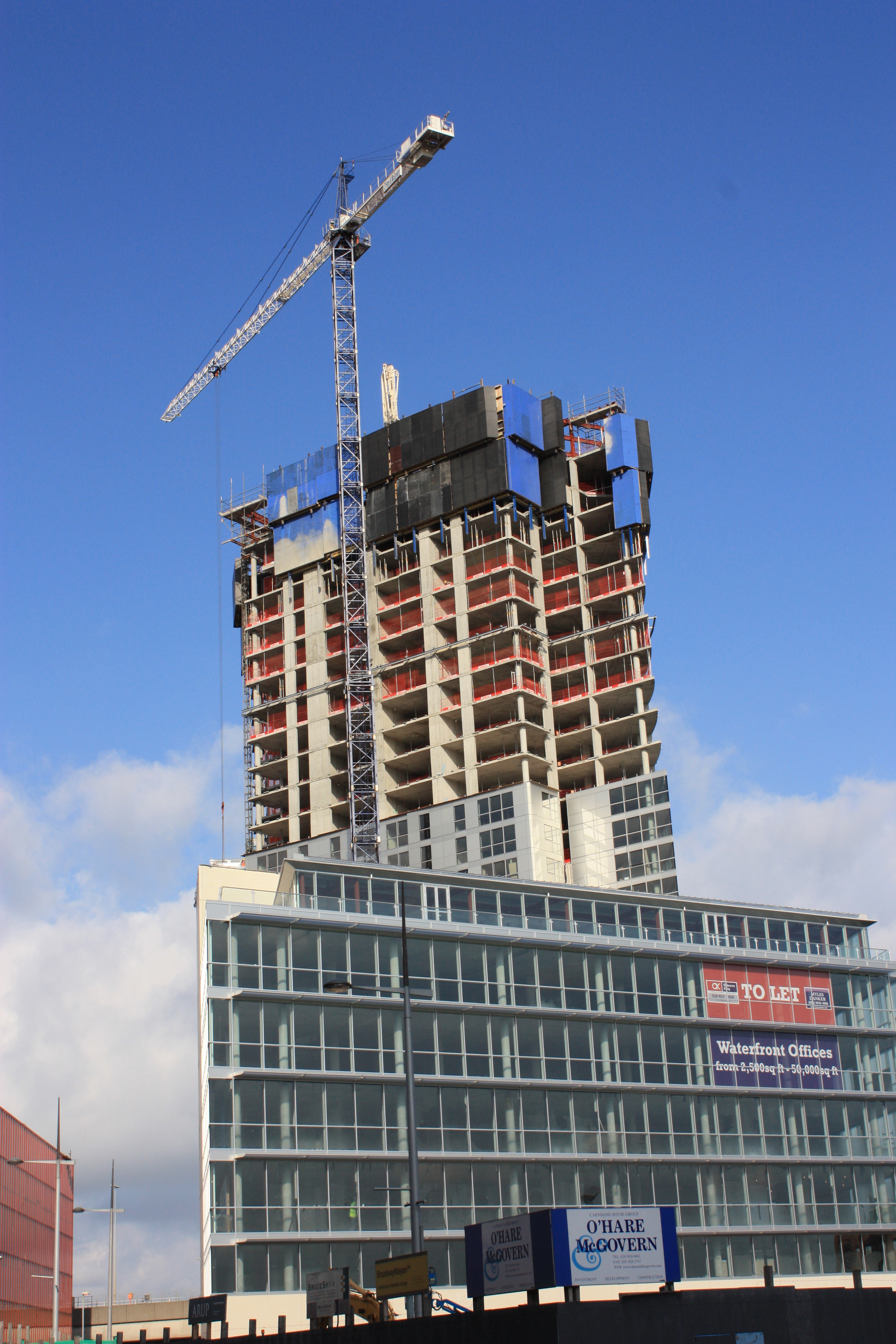
Obel Tower, October 2009

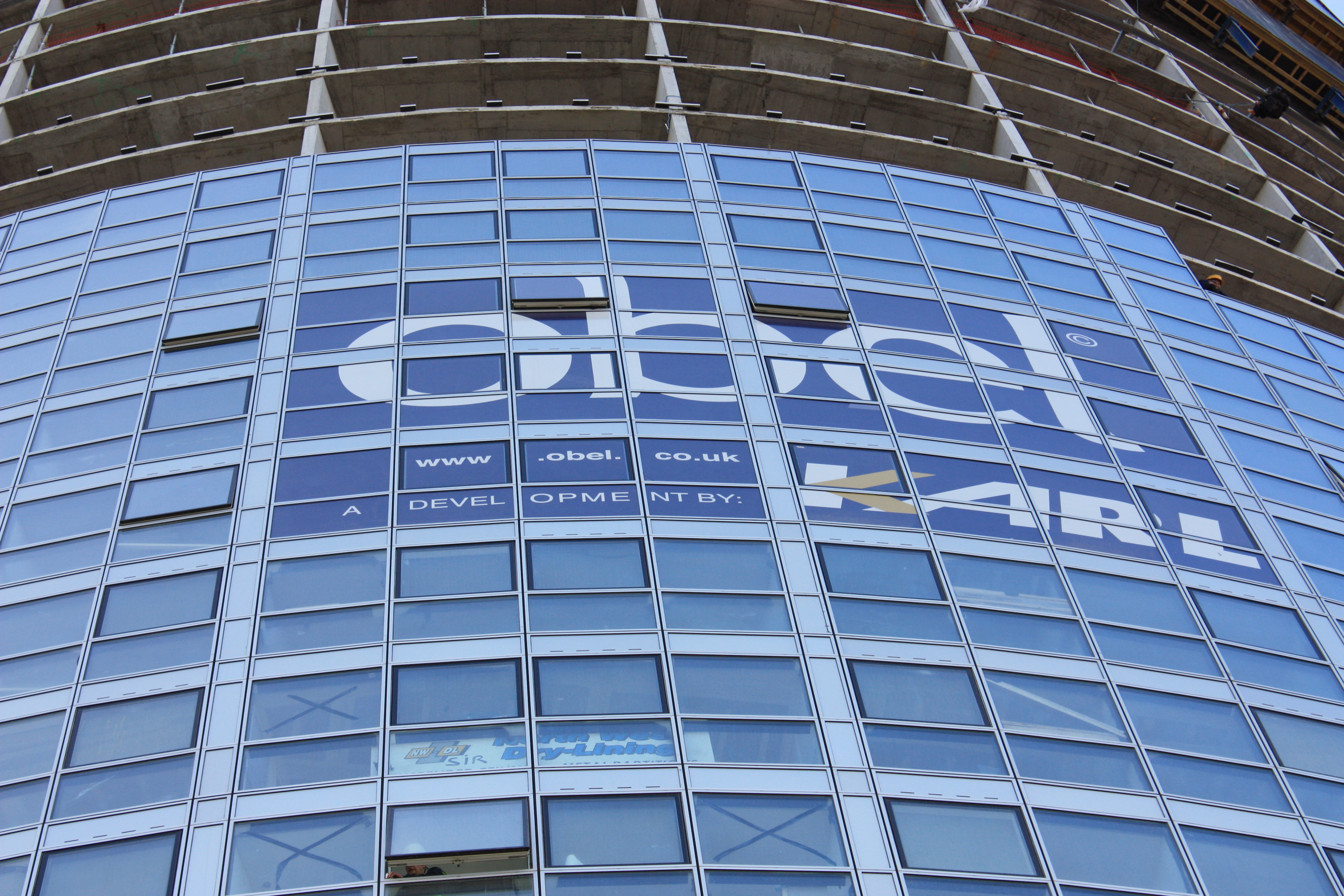
Obel Tower, October 2009

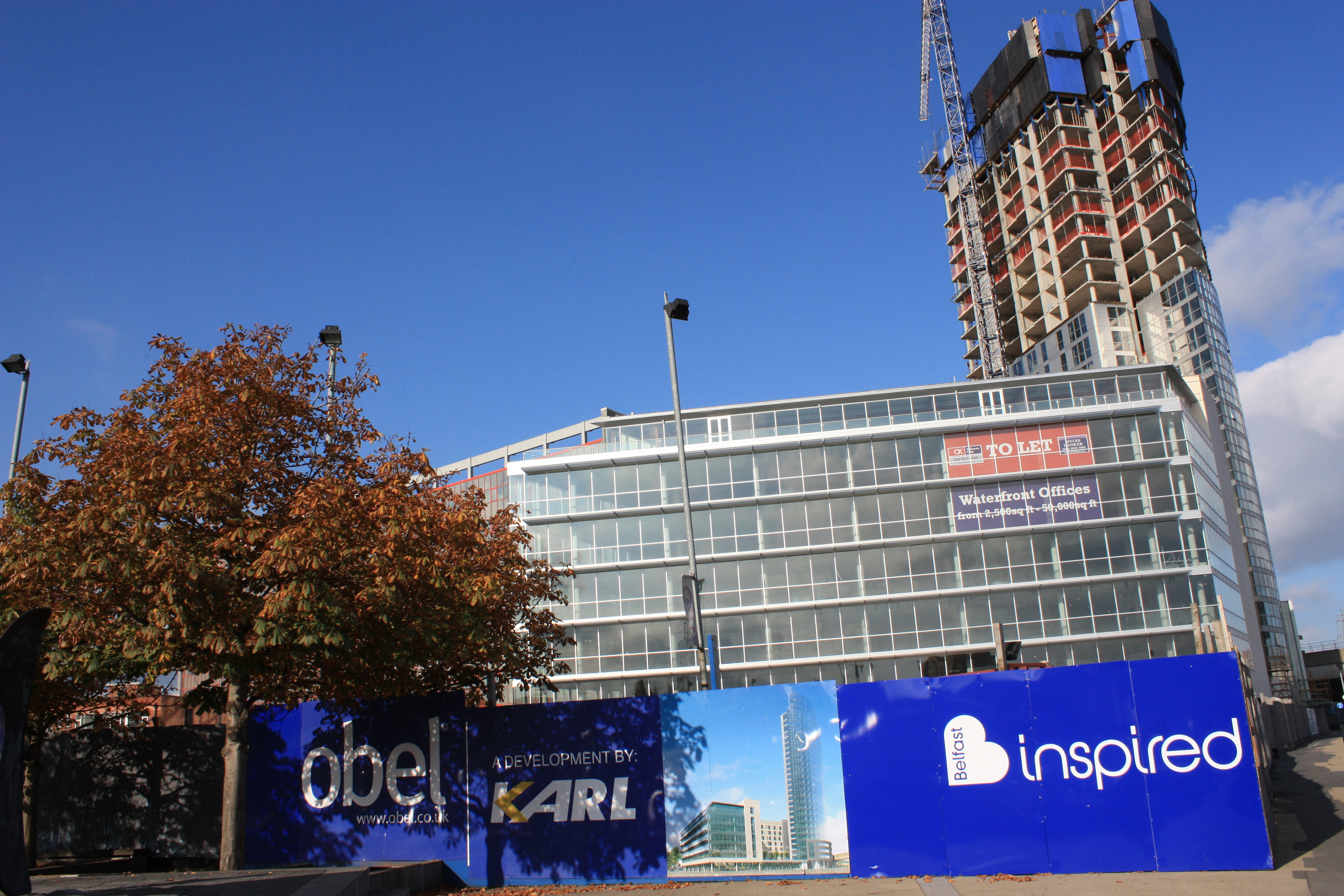
Obel Tower, October 2009

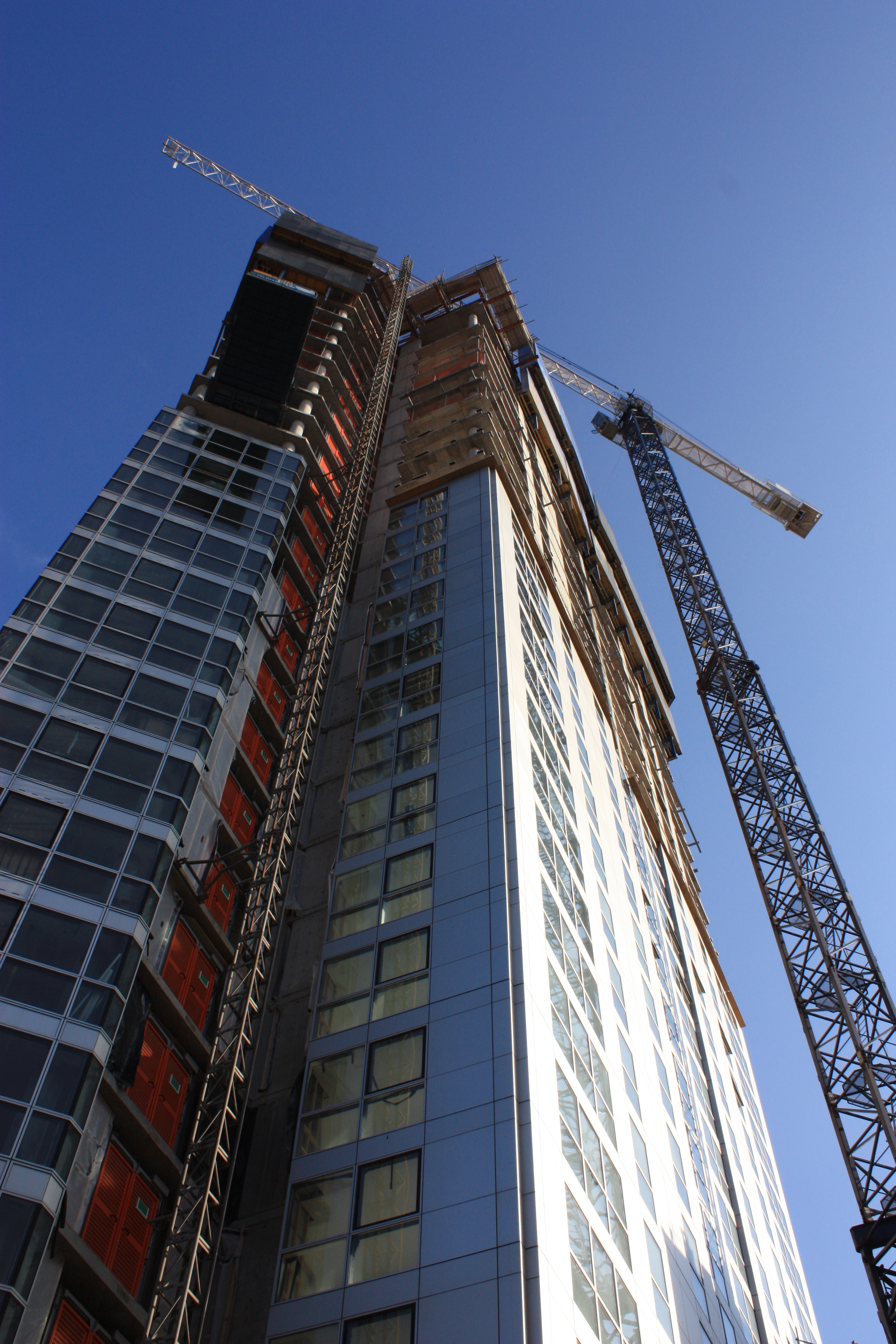
Obel Tower, October 2009

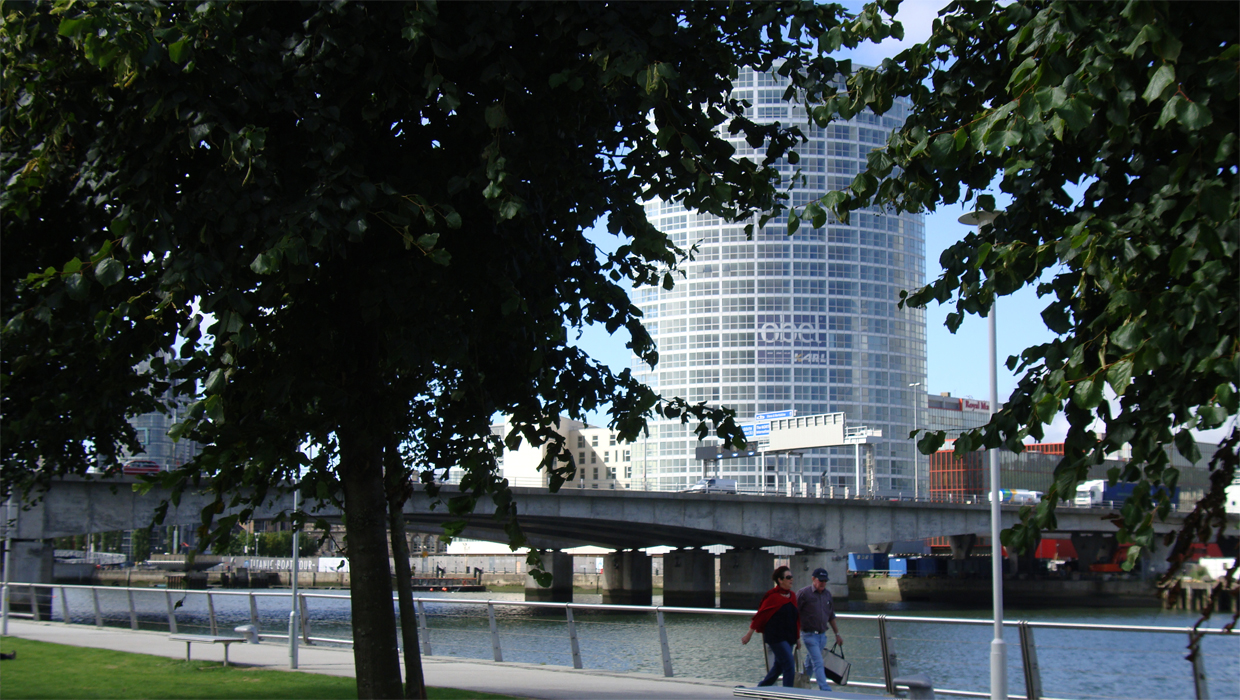
Obel Tower completed

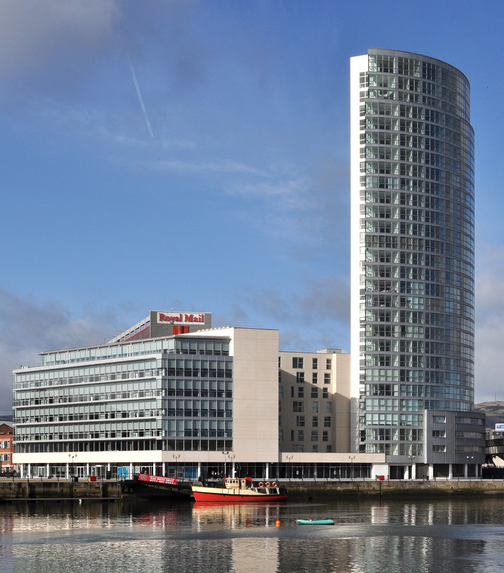
Obel Tower August 2013
