= The Exo Building =

Office development in the Dublin Docklands, Ireland

- The Exo Building in March 2021

General information
- Status: Completed
- Architectural style: Modernist
- Location: North Wall Quay, Dublin 1, D01 W5Y2, Dublin, Ireland
- Coordinates: 53.34755°N 6.22755°W
- Construction started: January 2018
- Completed: 2021
- Cost: €80m development finance
- Owner: European Property Investors Special Opportunities IV (EPISO 4) Fund via Tristan Capital Partners

Height
- Architectural: 73.8 m (242 ft)

Technical details
- Floor count: 17
- Floor area: 16,025 m^{2} (172,490 sq ft)
- Lifts/elevators: 9

Design and construction
- Architect: Shay Cleary Architects
- Developer: Receivers from Grant Thornton on behalf of the National Asset Management Agency
- Structural engineer: O'Connor Sutton Cronin
- Main contractor: Bennett Construction

Website
- www.theexobuilding.com

The Exo Building is a 17-story office building located at the corner of North Wall Quay and East Wall Road in Dublin 1, Ireland. The building is adjacent to the Point Depot (now the 3Arena) fronting on to the river Liffey and Dublin port. As of 2021, it was the tallest office building in the Republic of Ireland at 73 metres tall. The name Exo is in reference to its exoskeleton which reflects the traditional industrial crane and gantry landscape of the port area.

State owned postal services and delivery company An Post have signed a lease in 2021 to become the anchor tenant of the building. As of 2023, An Post intended to occupy 6 floors of the building with around 900 of its staff.

== History ==
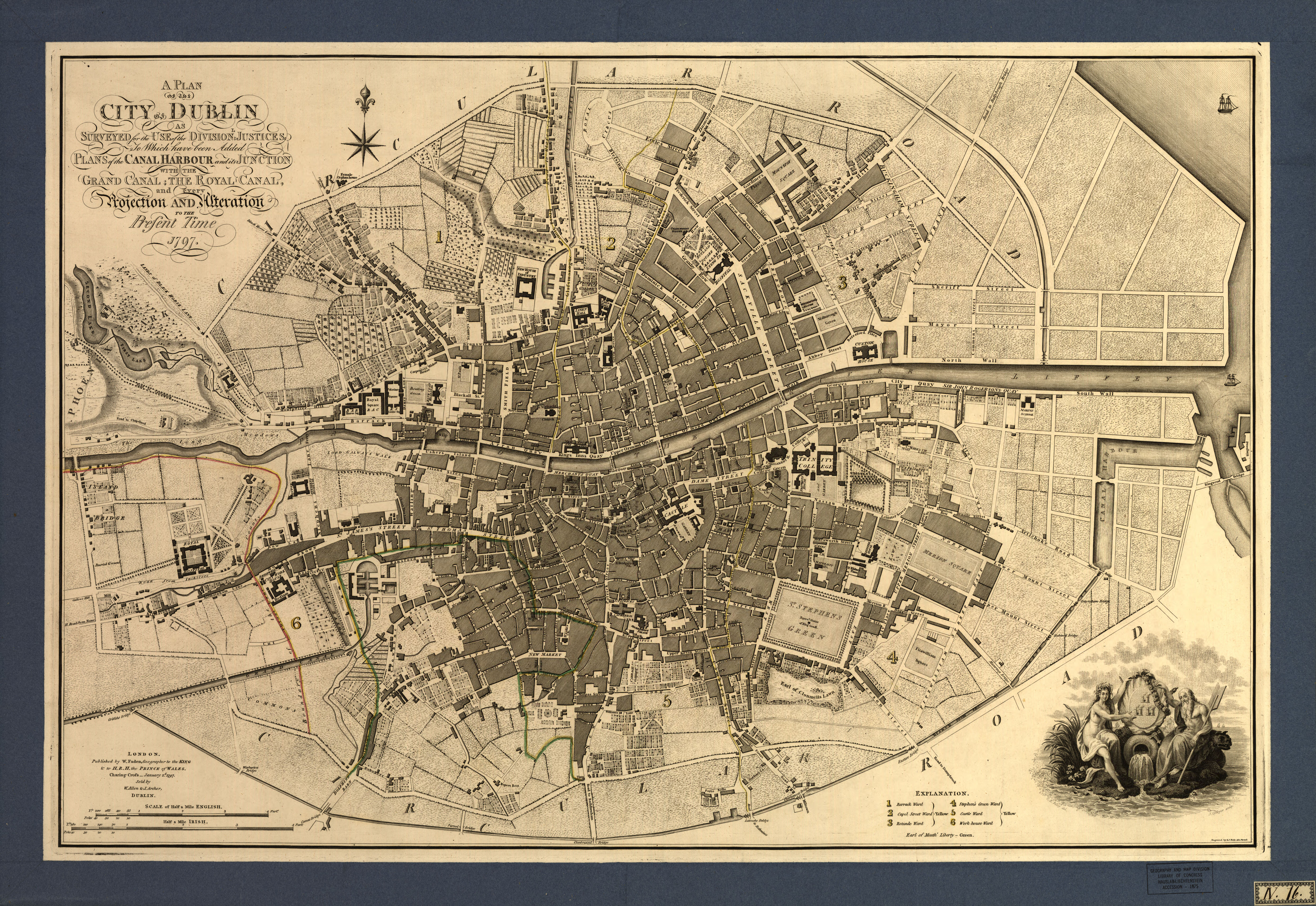
Map of Dublin showing the site facing on the sea and river in 1797

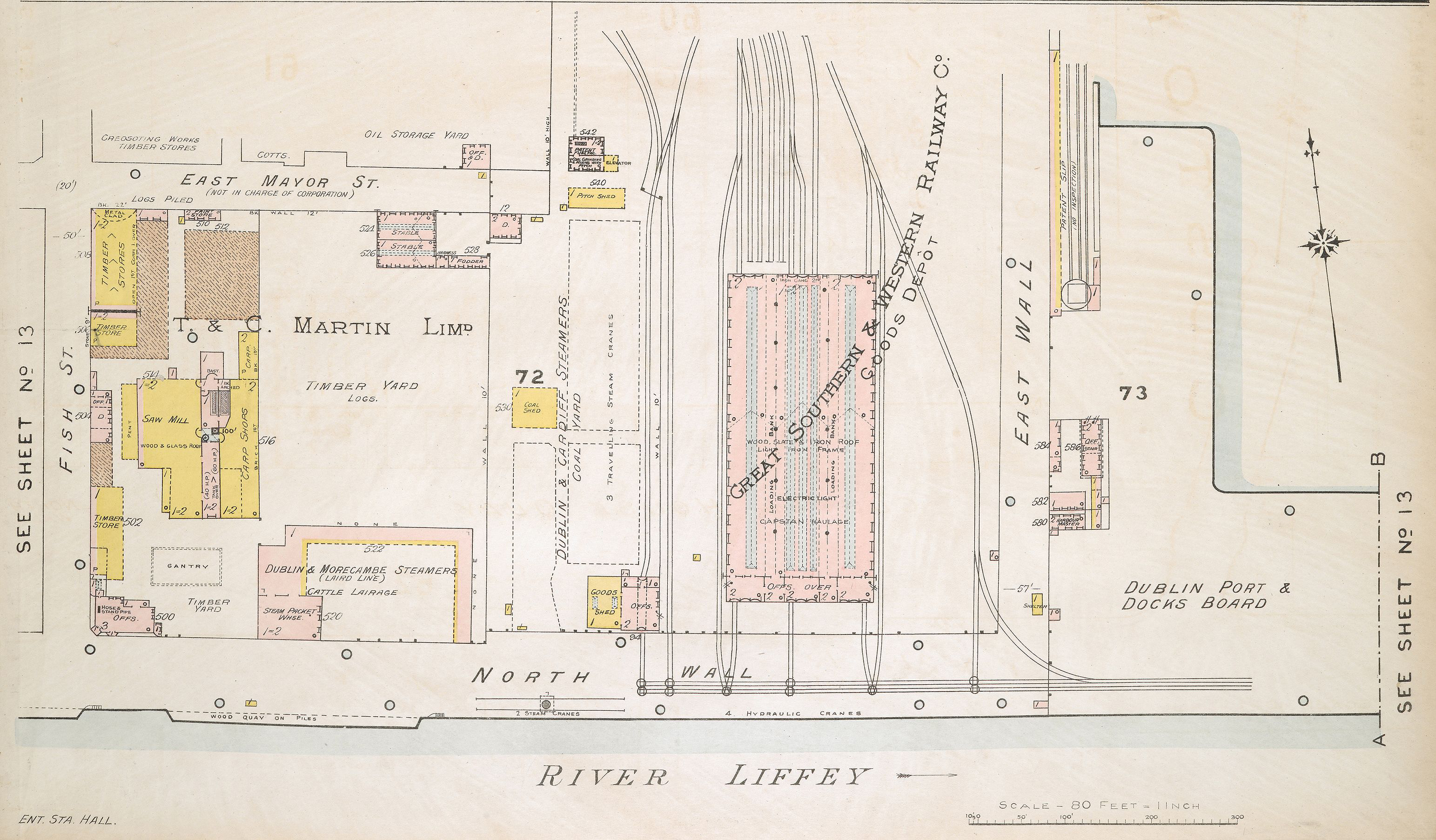
Insurance Plan of the area c.1890

The site was part of Dublin Bay and included a series of islands at low tide up until the reclamation of the land following the construction of the North Wall in 1717. The exact location sat at the corner of the reclaimed land facing open sea on one side and the mouth of the river Liffey on another prior to the construction of the modern Dublin Port.

The site was later used as a railway and support yard by the Great Southern and Western Railway Company as part of the overall Point Depot facility. Later in the 20th century as the site ceased being used as a railway and goods depot, the main warehouse changed use to a music and concert venue while the adjacent yard ceased being used to transport trains and good carts to the port and largely lay empty as a supporting space.

== The Watchtower ==
The building was constructed on a site which was previously earmarked for a Harry Crosbie Celtic Tiger era 40-storey residential skyscraper named The Watchtower. The building was later revised down to 32 stories before planning was granted by the Dublin Docklands Development Authority in 2006. While construction began on the building soon after with excavations being completed in full and foundations and a 3-storey underground basement nearing completion, following the collapse of the Irish property market, the scheme was ultimately mothballed.

A succession of one off amusements and instalments, including the underground Harry's Bar and the Wheel of Dublin, operated in and over the filled-in space for a period owing to its location adjacent to the 3 Arena. Crosbie's loans ultimately transferred to NAMA in 2013 and soon after Grant Thornton were appointed receivers with the development officially ceasing.

== See also ==
- Point Village
