= Belfast Central Library =

Public library in Royal Avenue, Belfast, Northern Ireland

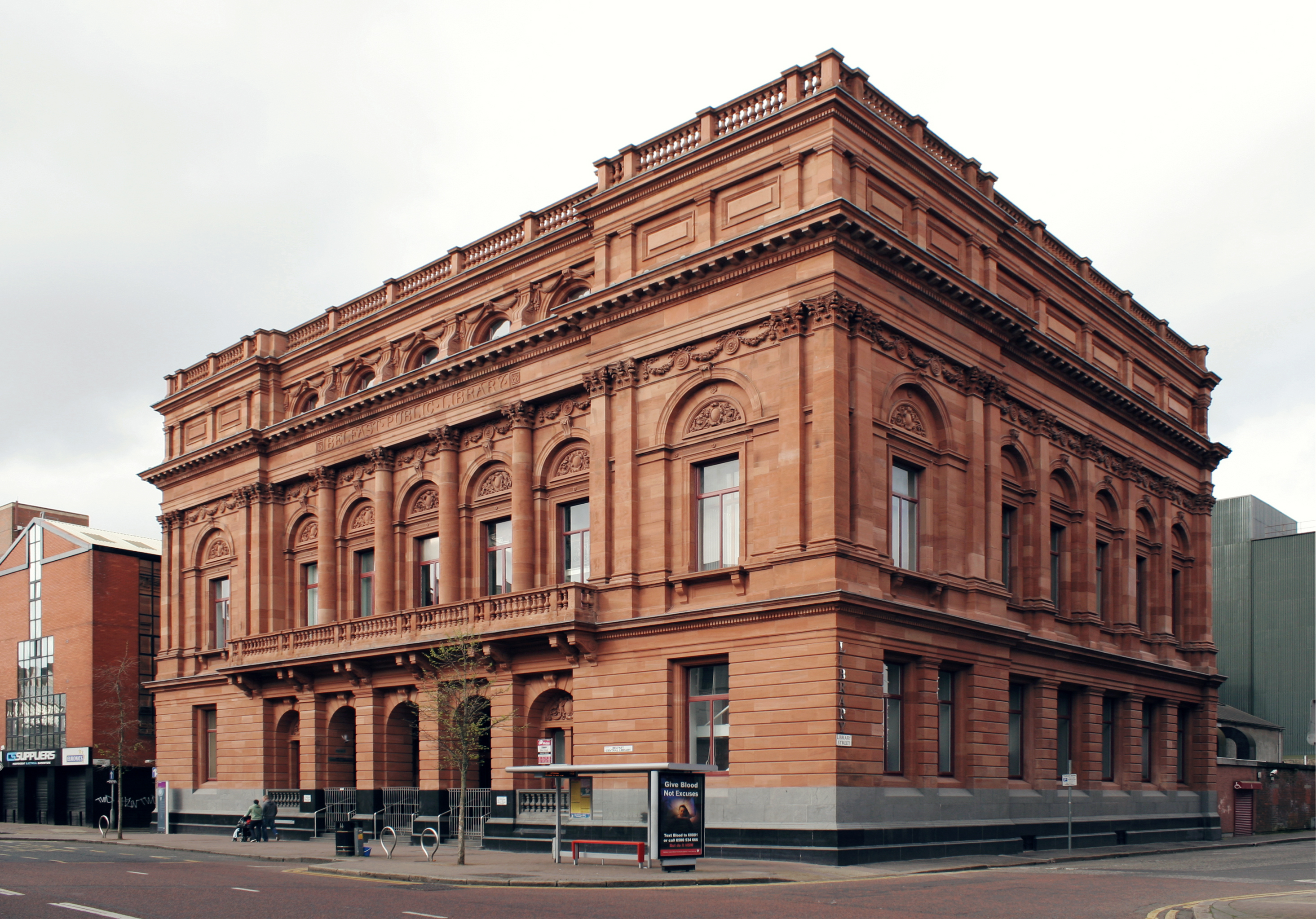
- 54°36′10.19″N 5°55′52.02″W
- Location: Royal Avenue, Belfast, Northern Ireland
- Type: Public Library
- Established: 1888

Collection
- Items collected: books, journals, newspapers, magazines, maps, sound and music recordings and sheet music

Other information
- Website: www.librariesni.org.uk/libraries/greater-belfast/belfast-central-library/

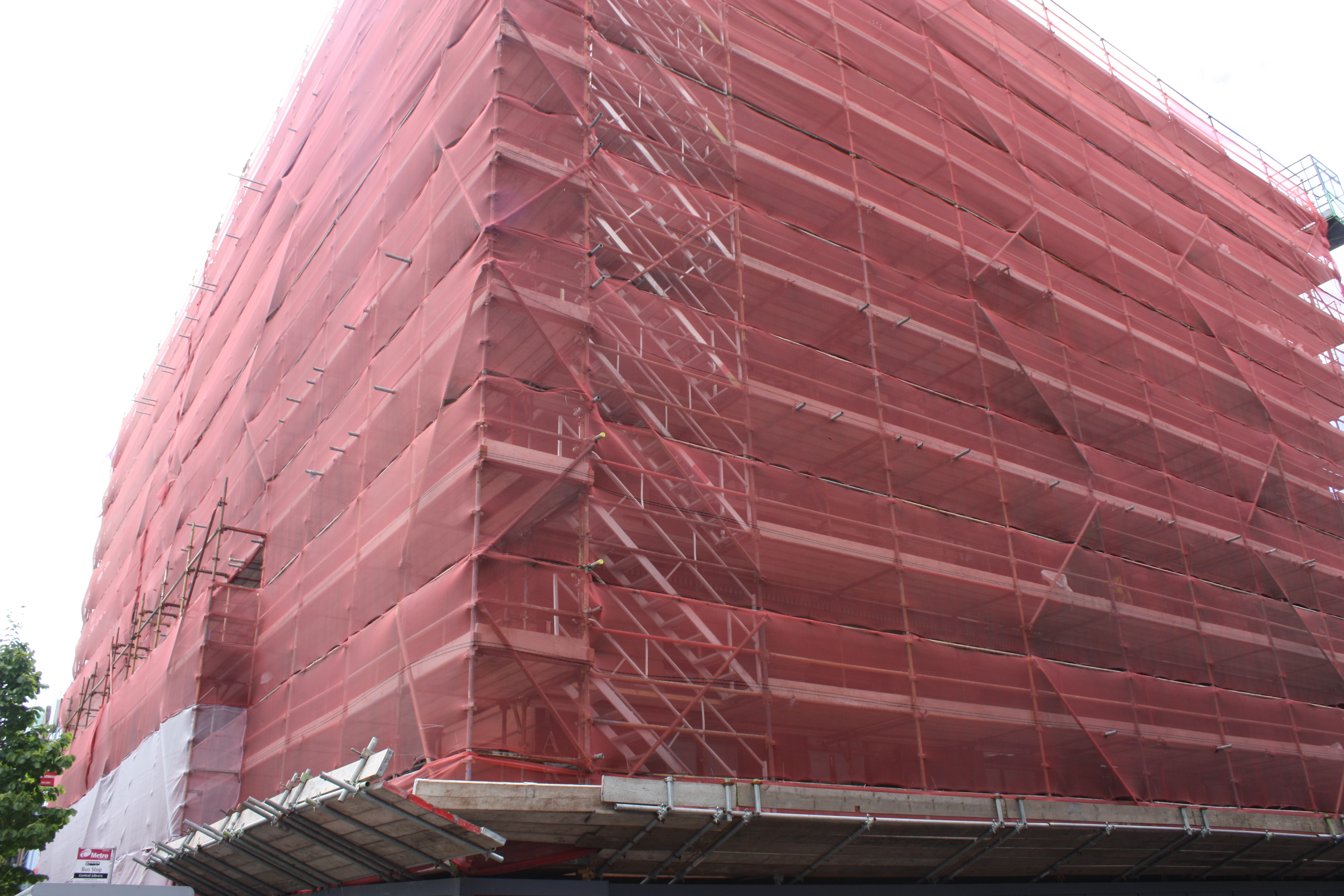
The library, scaffolded for a stonework restoration, July 2010

Belfast Central Library is a public library in Royal Avenue, Belfast, Northern Ireland. Opened in 1888, it was one of the first major public library buildings in Ireland.

A competition for the design of the building was won by architect William Henry Lynn in 1883 and it was built by H & J Martin builders. Designed to reflect the ambitions of the growing city of Belfast, its architecture is a fine example of a public building at the height of the Victorian age. On a black granite base, the Dumfries red sandstone exterior with a slightly Italianate feel, houses a three-floor interior with a sweeping staircase, a pillared foyer, and a fine domed first-floor reading room. The top floor originally included a museum and art gallery. The building is a notable part of the 19th-century cityscape of modern Belfast. It survived undamaged through the Belfast Blitz of World War II and the Troubles of the late 20th century.

The library is in the library and Cathedral Quarter, on the edge of Belfast City Centre and close to the Belfast Campus of the University of Ulster. Two additional buildings were added to the site in the 1960s and 1980s, providing staff accommodation and extra storage. These reflect the growth in the book stock of the library in the intervening decades. A newspaper library is in the 1980s building and accessed from Library Street.

The Library is now run by Northern Ireland Libraries, a public authority covering the whole of Northern Ireland. Belfast Central Library houses a range of sections, including a lending library & Information and Business library still based in the original reading room. A Belfast, Ulster and Irish Department & Music Library on the top floor. It is a major provider of IT facilities on the ground floor providing free internet access.

== Special collections ==
The Library has a number of special collections, including a fine book collection, the library and manuscripts of Francis Joseph Bigger, the manuscripts of the eccentric Amanda McKittrick Ros and the manuscripts of the Ulster playwright Sam Thompson.

The Northern Ireland Music Archive is a computerised database housing recordings, scores and other materials relating to music created by Northern Ireland composers/artists. The Archive, which was funded and developed by the Arts Council of Northern Ireland houses music from the contemporary/classical genre, as well as folk and traditional materials from the Geoff Harden Archive.

Northern Ireland Screen has also placed an access point to their Digital Film Archive in the Lending Library.

Along with Linen Hall Library, Belfast Central Library houses the repository for the Northern Ireland Publications Resource (NIPR), which collects and catalogues all of Northern Ireland's titles published since 2001.

== Gallery ==
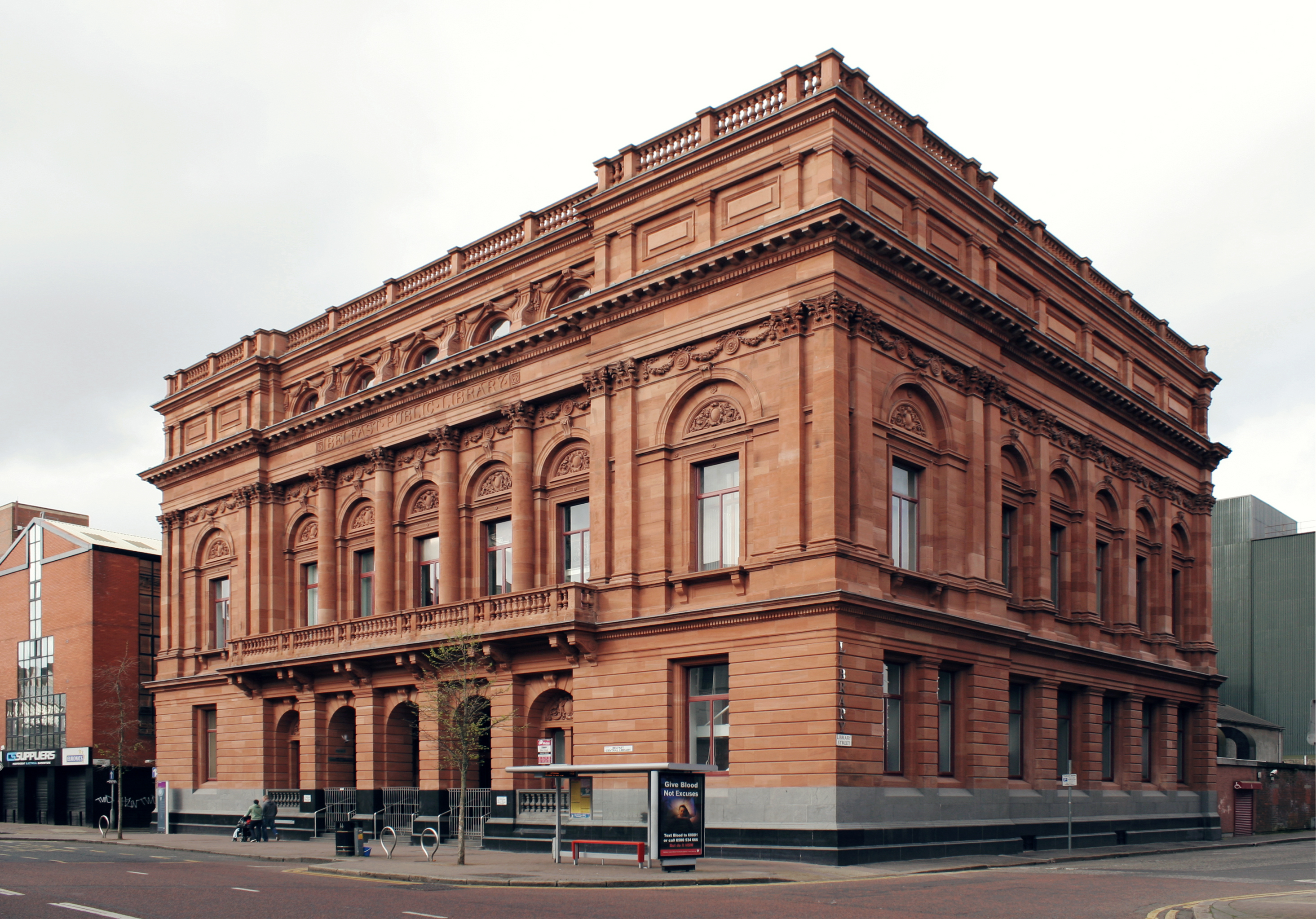
Central Library, Belfast, Country Antrim, Northern Ireland

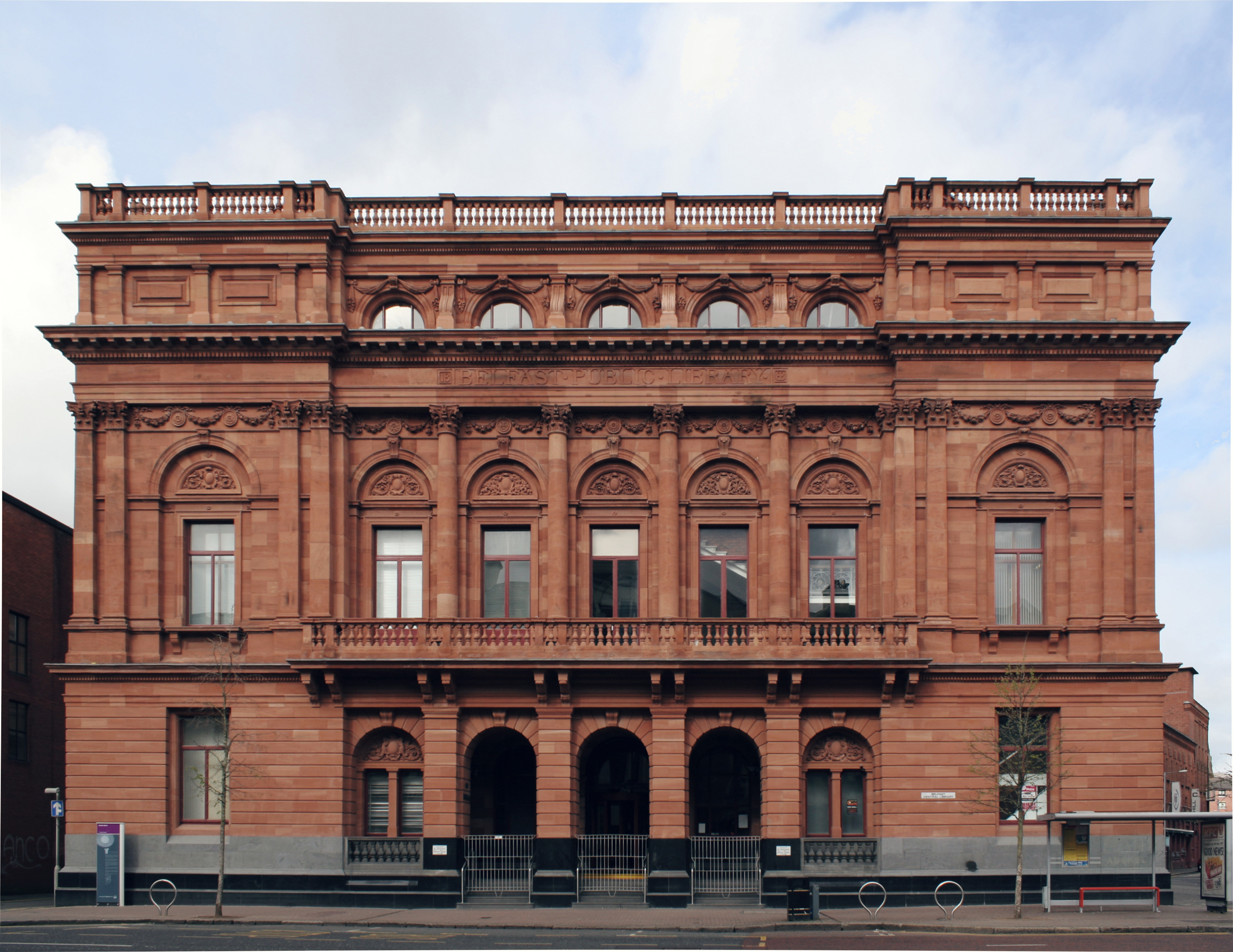
Central Library, Front Elevation, Belfast, Northern Ireland

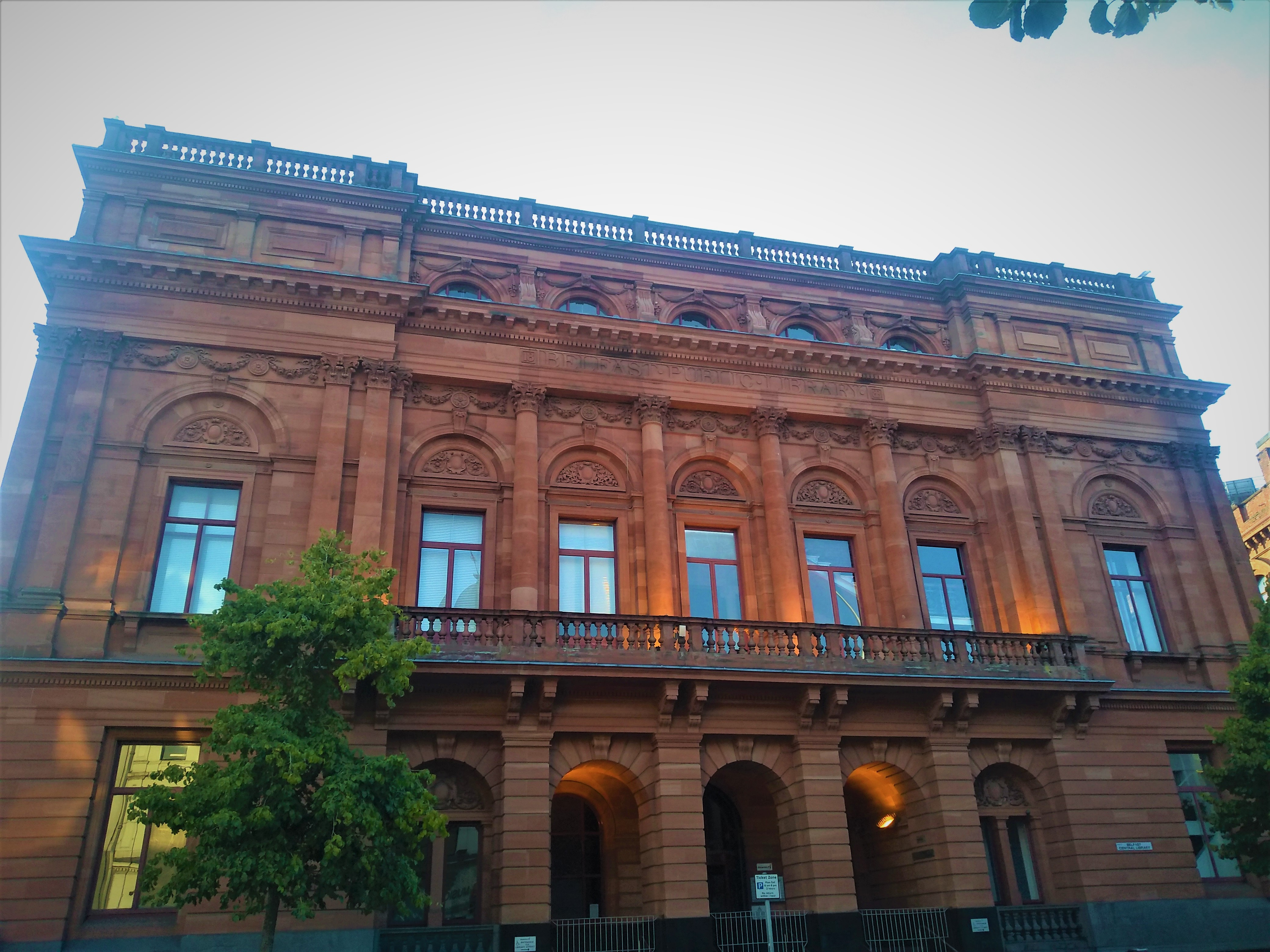
Belfast Public Library building

== See also ==
- Library Quarter, Belfast
