= Belfast Grand Central =

Belfast Grand Central may refer to several things in Belfast, Northern Ireland:

- Belfast Grand Central station, a major integrated bus and train station
- Grand Central Hotel Belfast, the name of two separate hotels
