= CastleCourt =

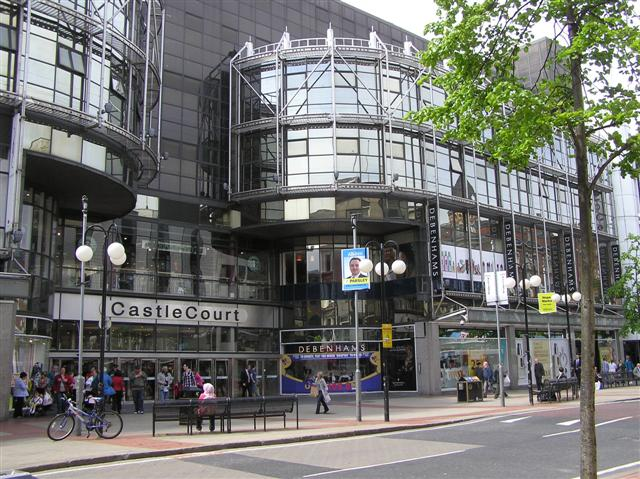
- Outside CastleCourt in 2009
- Location: Belfast, Northern Ireland
- Coordinates: 54°36′1″N 5°55′53″W
- Opened: 1990
- Owner: Wirefox
- Num. of stores: 77
- Num. of anchor tenants: 1
- Floor area: 31,121 m^{2} (334,980 sq ft)
- Floors: 2
- Parking: 1600
- Website: www.castlecourt-uk.com

CastleCourt is a shopping centre on Royal Avenue in Belfast, Northern Ireland. It is Northern Ireland's fourth largest shopping centre. As of 2007, it had approximately 16 million visits a year, and sale densities ranked in the top 10% in the UK.

== History ==
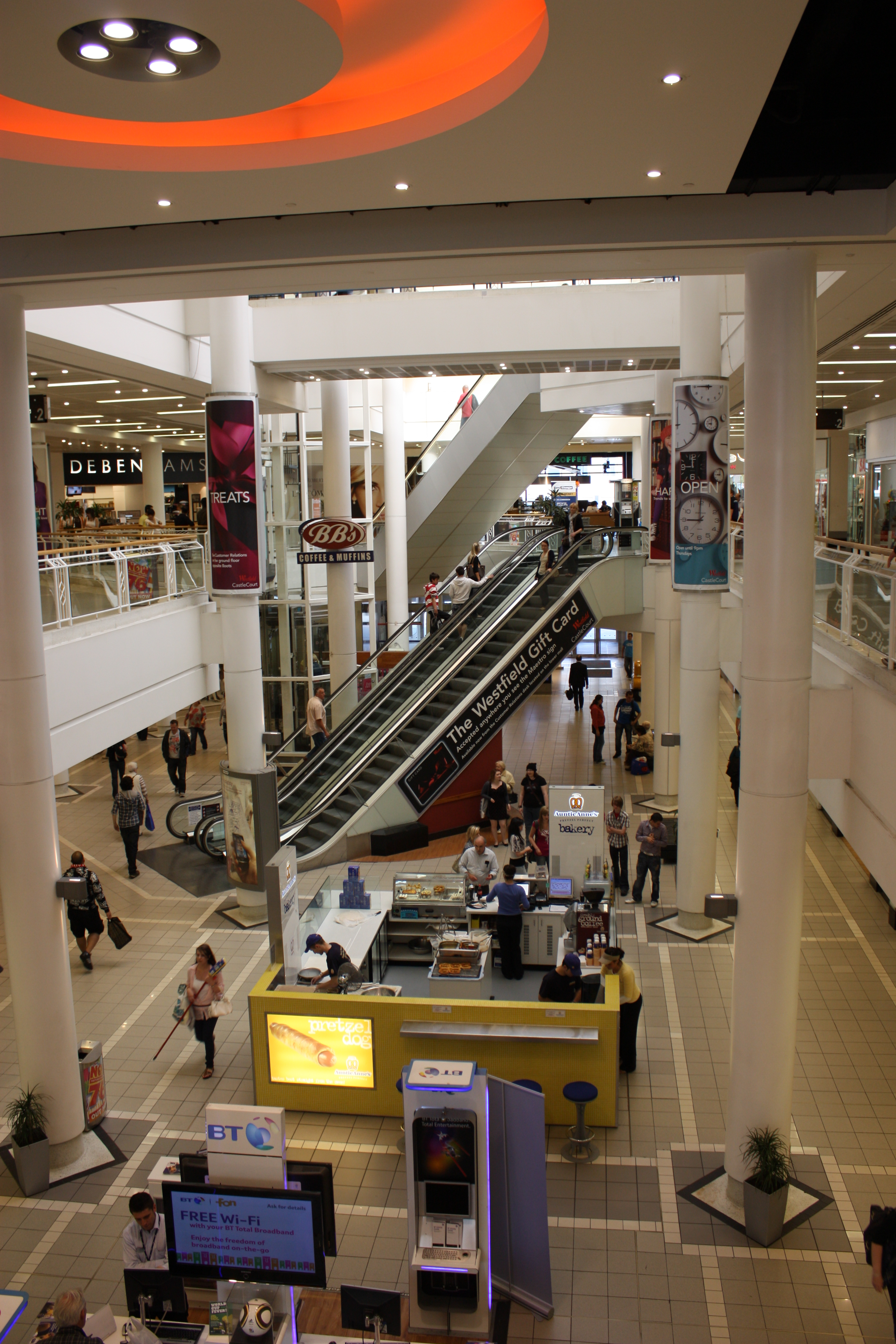
Inside in 2010

The centre was built by John Laing on the site of the former Grand Central Hotel. The nature of the development made it a target for the Provisional IRA: the centre was bombed five times during its construction, four times after it opened, and suffered incendiary bomb attacks. It is now the fourth largest shopping complex in Northern Ireland.

When it opened in 1990, Debenhams was the anchor tenant at the centre and the first in Ireland, stores included Eason, Boots, Next, Virgin Megastores, Ratners, Early Learning Centre, Nice, Petal, United Colors of Benetton and The Original Art Shop.

The centre was brought by the Westfield Group and MEPC plc (later with Hermes Retail Estate) in 2000, renaming it Westfield CastleCourt. Westfield sold its share of the centre fully to Hermes Retail Estate in 2012, effectively renaming it back to just CastleCourt.

In 2005, CastleCourt was refurbished, which included the removal of the fountains, an enlarged food court and a Starbucks cafe overlooking the entrance.

In 2021, a multi-plan development was announced for the former Debenhams which closed the same year. The multi-plan development included a new cinema operated by Omniplex Cinemas called The Avenue, a new Starbucks (relocating from their former presence in the centre), New Look (which also takes up the store space of Hawkin's Bazaar), the return of TK Maxx in the centre after moving to Donegall Arcade on 9 April 2009, the first Northern Irish Vanilla store and a 50,000 sq ft adventure centre.
