= Northern Ireland Music Archive =

Coordinates: 54°36′10.19″N 5°55′52.02″W

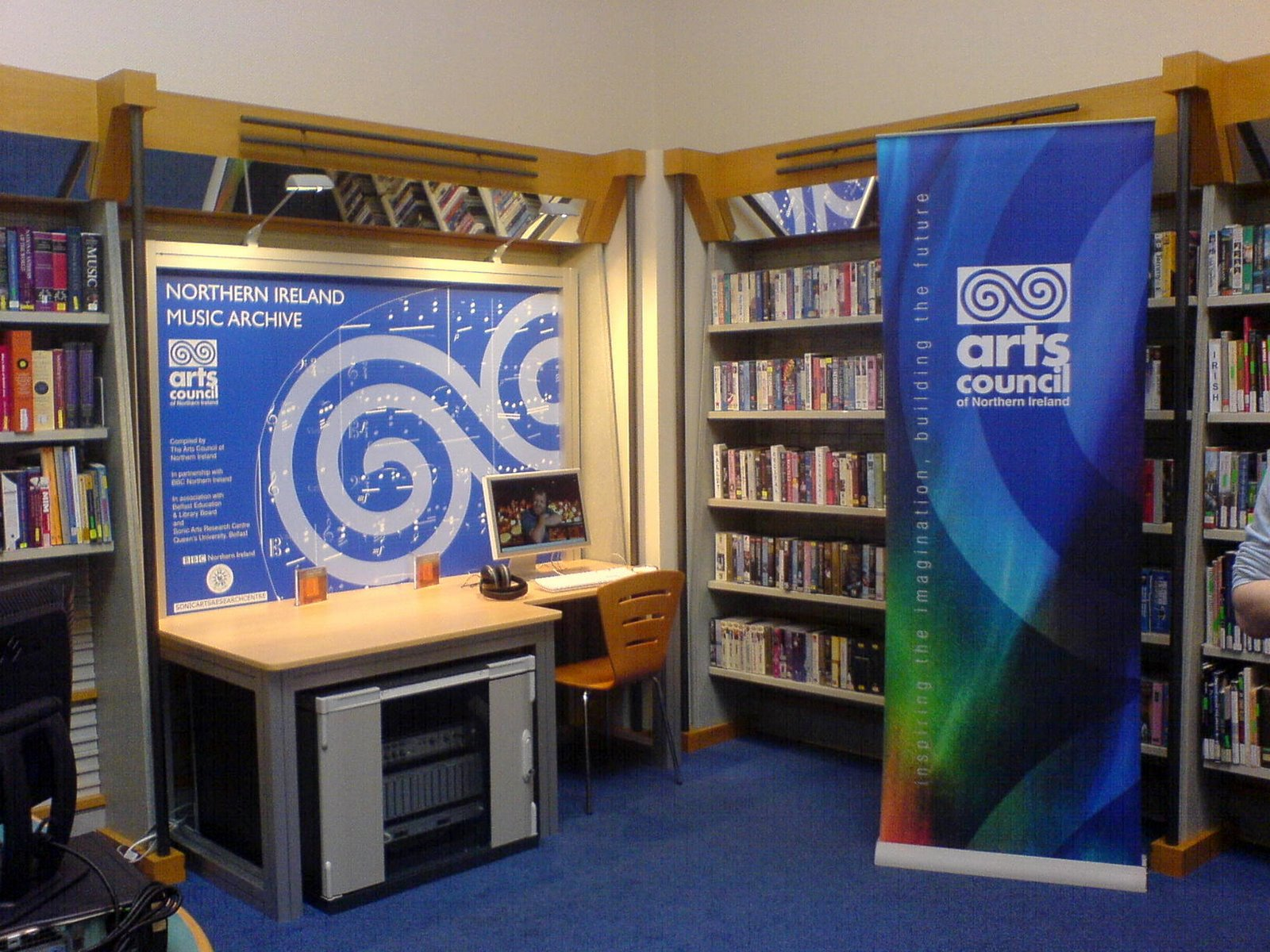
- The archive server in the Music Library, Belfast Central Library
- Location: Belfast Central Library, Belfast, Northern Ireland
- Type: Digital archive
- Established: 2006

Collection
- Items collected: Audio recordings, musical scores, programme notes, photographs, music scene publications
- Size: c. 900 items

The Northern Ireland Music Archive is a digital archive of materials related to music from Northern Ireland. It is based on a publicly accessible computer system situated in the Music Library at Belfast Central Library, Belfast, County Antrim. The archive has been funded and developed by the Arts Council of Northern Ireland.

== History ==
The first materials for the archive were provided by BBC Northern Ireland and were collated and digitised from 2003 onwards, with input and assistance provided by the Sonic Arts Research Centre and Belfast Central Library.

The archive was officially launched on 30 March 2006, with a day of music from numerous contemporary performers including the Brian Irvine Ensemble. At its launch, it contained approximately 400 recordings and a number of scanned sheet music of pieces by 20th-century and contemporary/classical composers born or settled in Northern Ireland. The Arts Council planned to enlarge this collection in the future, with the hope of expanding into other genres of music such as folk, rock and pop.

In 2007, a selection of folk and traditional materials were incorporated from a sizeable collection of tapes bequeathed by local folk promoter and journalist, Geoff Harden. This set of materials was digitised with additional assistance from the City of Belfast School of Music. The new additions were profiled at an official event at the library, which featured live music from local traditional musicians and a speech and song from veteran folk/traditional singer, Len Graham.

== Materials ==
The Northern Ireland Music Archive features digitised materials of numerous formats:

=== Audio recordings ===
- Live performances of classical/contemporary compositions by composers from Northern Ireland
- Interview footage of composers from Northern Ireland
- Radio documentaries on composers and the Northern Irish classical/contemporary music scene
- Live performances by folk/traditional musicians recorded in Northern Ireland

Recordings date from the 1960s up to the present.

=== Visual articles ===
- Sheet music of pieces by composers from Northern Ireland
- Programme notes from premiere (or otherwise notable) performances of pieces by Northern Ireland composers
- Publications relating to the Northern Irish folk scene, including issues of Ulster Folk News
- Photographs of composers and musicians

== Access ==
The archive is housed on a computer server in the Music Library, 2nd Floor, Belfast Central Library. The computer is free to browse at any time during library opening hours; the materials are available for reference only.
