= Modelzone =

British scale model brand and former high street model retail chain

Modelzone Limited
- Current logo
- Company type: Subsidiary of WHSmith plc
- Industry: Retail
- Predecessor: Model Aerodrome
- Founded: Brighton, England (8 November 1937)
- Fate: Acquired by WHSmith, maintained as specialist brand
- Headquarters: Swindon, Wiltshire, United Kingdom
- Number of locations: 10 (through WHSmith)
- Area served: United Kingdom
- Products: Scale models; Toys
- Parent: WHSmith plc
- Website: whsmith.co.uk

Modelzone Limited (often typeset ModelZone and Model Zone) is a scale model brand, owned by British retailer WHSmith, of which scale models and related products are sold in WHSmith stores and online.

Prior to administration and the subsequent acquisition of the brand by WHSmith in 2013, it operated as a retail company through a chain of high-street stores and a distribution arm, Amerang. When Modelzone entered administration in June 2013, the company had 47 branches and 385 employees, and was the UK's largest model retailer. On 28 August 2013, administrators announced that the company would cease independent trading during September 2013 and the remaining 18 shops would close at that point.

In October 2013, WHSmith announced that it had acquired the ModelZone name, with plans to use the brand to sell products through existing WHSmith branches; 10 of its shops had begun to carry products under the brand name by the end of November 2013, with WHSmith also using the Modelzone name to sell online by December 2013.

== History ==
=== Beginnings and name change ===
Originally incorporated as Model Aircraft (Bournemouth) Ltd on 8 November 1937, the company started with one store in Brighton in the 1930s. When this was sold after about 40 years under the same ownership, the store was bought in order to be "a showroom for the importers of many prestige model ranges". Following success at this store, the new owners then began to purchase other shops, in Crawley, Eastbourne, Guildford and Maidstone, and brand them as Model Aerodrome. During the mid-90s a computerised stock control system was implemented, and in 1995 and 1996 respectively, the company opened stores in Croydon and Plymouth.

In March 1999, after the opening of their eighth branch in Bluewater, Kent, the company expanded its range to include Scalextric and Corgi products, and with this expansion of their product line, changed their name to Modelzone. Then they eventually acquired a number of stores formerly owned by the Beatties chain of model shops (which had closed when its parent company, ERA Group, placed it into administration).

=== Investor buyout and expansion ===
In July 2009, ModelZone's new investors sought to "defy the credit crunch" through a buyout led by CEO David Mordecai and non-executive chairman Terry Norris. The buyout was the subject of a prolonged negotiation with private equity investor Lloyds Development Capital, who were initially sceptical of Modelzone's long-term growth forecast. Indeed, as LDC Investment Manager Miles Frost commented in 2010, "The credit crunch hit in 2008 and backing a retailer was a scary prospect for an investor, especially when Modelzone's sales were declining."

Despite LDC's initial scepticism, a strong Christmas performance and internal reforms towards the end of 2008 led LDC to reappraise ModelZone's growth prospects and agree an MBO in July 2009. This agreement saw LDC invest £5.6 million supported by a further £3.6 million of funding over three years. With the MBO complete, in 2010 the ModelZone board began an expansion plan which saw 15 stores open between 2010 and 2012, including in Scotland and in Wales.

By the end of 2012 the company had grown to 47 stores, but this "disastrous" expansion would prove to be too much for the company as it entered into administration at the end of the second quarter of 2013. In one of their most recent accounts, Modelzone stated:

Trading performance for the year was disappointing ... Following a review of the business, it became clear that the business infrastructure and management capability was insufficient, not only to take the business forward and grow further, but also to deliver sustainable profitability. It was also evident that the sales and profit expectations of the new stores opened between 2010 and 2012 were unrealistic.

— Modelzone

=== Administration and store closures ===
The company announced on 26 June 2013 that it had gone into administration. The announcement was made on Modelzone's website, minutes after informing staff, and with the rest of the e-commerce site having been abandoned. Many staff on leave and planned rest days learned of the administration through the website closure and social media:

On 26 June 2013, Richard Michael Hawes, Nicholas Guy Edwards and Robert James Harding of Deloitte LLP were appointed Joint Administrators of Modelzone Holdings Limited, The Amerang Group Limited, Modelzone Limited and Amerang Limited (together the "Companies"). The affairs, business and property of the Companies are being managed by the Joint Administrators. The Joint Administrators act as agents of the Companies only and contract without personal liability. The Joint Administrators are authorised by the Institute of Chartered Accountants in England and Wales (ICAEW). All licensed Insolvency Practitioners of Deloitte LLP are licensed in the UK

— Modelzone statement

The administration was announced just hours after retailers were due to pay rent for the next three months on 24 June, the quarterly rent day, and after ensuring the monthly staff salary pay day run on the 25th of each month, and securing capital return to investors with Deloitte. Alongside the notice on the company's website, notices were placed on the company's e-commerce website refusing all online trade (including Amazon and eBay accounts). Gift vouchers were still being accepted, but at 50% of their face value.

Administrators Deloitte were reported to have been approached with a bid by former owner David Mordecai, who had been made chief executive of Tobar Group after it and subsidiary company toy retailer Hawkin's Bazaar were bought out of administration in 2012. This bid was reported to have been for 20 to 25 stores of the then-47 store chain, but according to Mordecai, "the administrators will not look to break the chain up. They are only looking to sell the whole lot."

Five stores had been closed by 5 August 2013 with the loss of 45 jobs, and another 10 branches closed by 13 August 2013 with the loss of another 66 jobs, taking the company's retail presence down to 32 stores. A spokesman for Deloitte stated that "[t]he joint administrators to Modelzone are still trying to find a potential buyer for some or all of the stores. Unfortunately, to date no such purchaser has come forward."

On 19 August 2013, Deloitte announced the closure of 10 stores more, affecting the jobs of an additional 76 members of store staff. Administrator Richard Hawes at Deloitte said, "During the administration, it has become clear that all stores will not be able to continue to trade profitably, hence the closures announced this week. The administrators would like to thank the company's employees for their support and professionalism during this time."

The closure of ModelZone's stores was expected to have a negative effect on Hornby, whose long-standing partnership with Modelzone saw it selling stock as a concession within Modelzone stores. Hornby itself posted pre-tax losses of £3.4 million after "disappointing" sales of London 2012 merchandise. The day after Modelzone's administration proceedings were announced, Hornby released a statement to the stock market in response:

The Board of Hornby Plc notes that the retail group Modelzone has appointed Deloitte as administrator. Modelzone is an important business partner and although the news of the administration is disappointing our account management team has been well abreast of Modelzone's challenging trading situation and has been able to manage our financial exposure at an acceptable level. Hornby has a wide, multi-channel distribution platform, which it is continuing to broaden. In the UK, Hornby supplies over 700 independent model shops, national retail chains as well as selling direct to consumers via its online platform.

— Hornby statement

The administration of the business also included Modelzone's wholesale and distribution arm, Amerang Ltd, which operated from the same head offices and under the same management. On 17 July 2013 administrators announced that major competitor Ripmax Ltd had bought Amerang from the Modelzone group through newly incorporated company Pinehurst 104 Ltd, safeguarding the jobs of the wholesaler's 18 remaining employees. Joint Administrator Richard Hawes said that they "are delighted to have secured a buyer for Amerang, which continues to be an attractive brand given the strength of its customer and supplier base and its reputation in the market".

=== End of trading ===
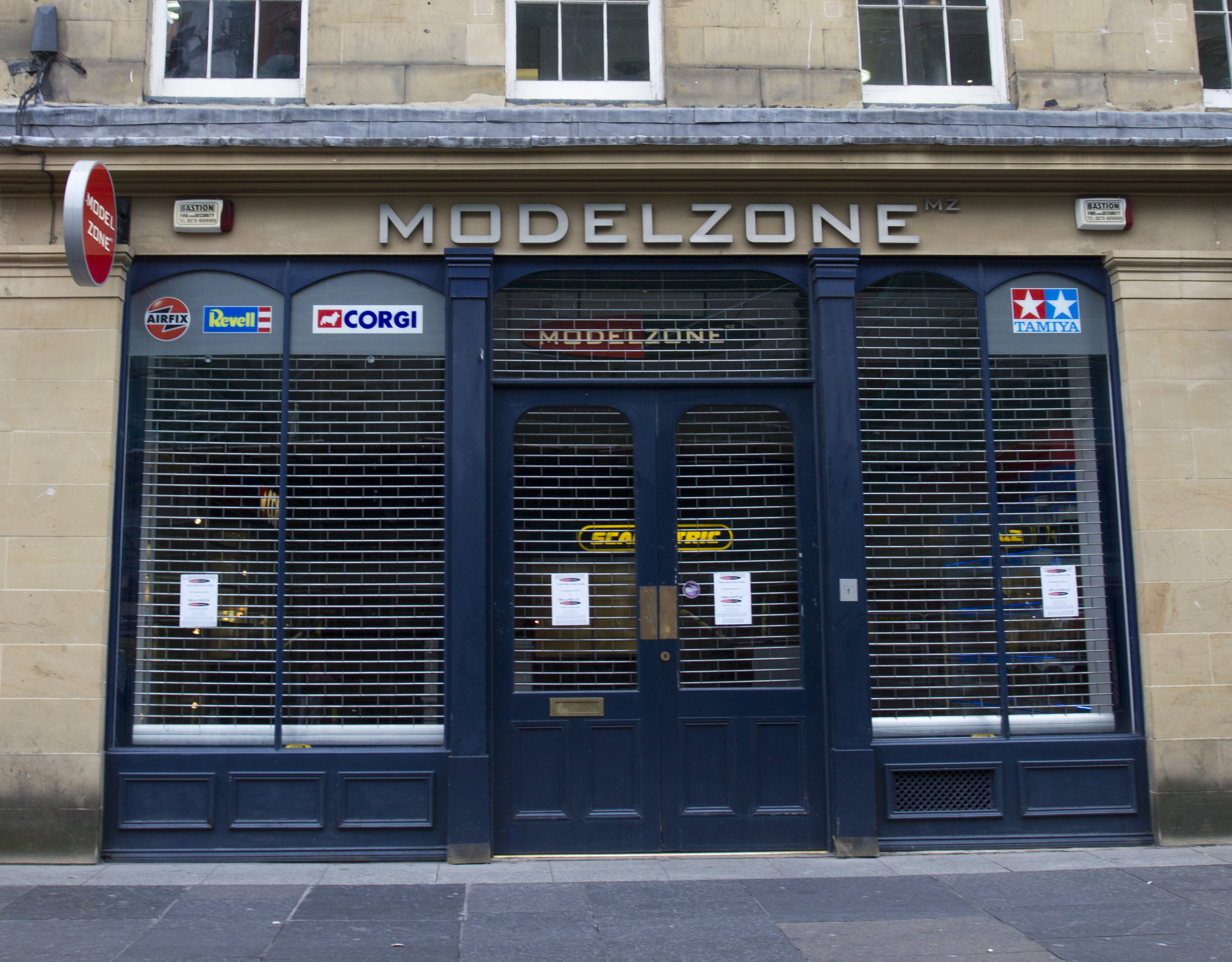
Modelzone Newcastle upon Tyne after its closure in September 2013.

Administrators confirmed on 28 August 2013 that "they had received no offers for the business on a going concern basis", and would be closing the last 18 stores by mid-September 2013, with the loss of the remaining 126 jobs.

Joint administrator Richard Hawes stated:

We sought to find a potential buyer for some or all of the stores, but unfortunately no viable offers have come in since our appointment two months ago. Modelzone has been generating losses over the past few years, largely through an increase in online competition and having taken leases on new stores that proved to be unprofitable. Once again, we would like to thank the company’s employees for their support and professionalism during this time.

— Richard Hawes, Deloitte

=== Relaunch of brand ===
In October 2013, WHSmith, a British retailer known for its high street stores selling books, stationery, magazines, newspapers and entertainment products, announced that it had bought the ModelZone brand, selling products under this brand through existing WHSmith stores, a format employed by the company with some of its other brands. WHSmith announced through the ModelZone Twitter page in November 2013 that 10 stores were to carry products under the ModelZone brand name by 23 November 2013. This was later accompanied by usage of the Modelzone brand on WHSmith's website to sell Airfix, Hornby, Corgi, and Scalextric products.
