= Beatties of London =

UK model retail company

Beatties of London Limited
- Company type: Limited
- Industry: Retail
- Founded: 19 April 1938
- Defunct: 30 March 2001
- Fate: Administration
- Headquarters: London, United Kingdom
- Number of locations: 60 (in 2000)
- Area served: United Kingdom
- Products: Scale models Toys
- Number of employees: 250 (at the time of 26 stores)
- Parent: ERA Group

Beatties of London (commonly known as Beatties) was a model retail company of the United Kingdom, not to be confused with the Beatties department store group.

== History ==
Beatties was founded by Colonel S N Beattie and Charles Whale as the Southgate Model Shop. In the early 1960s they had two small shops on Winchmore Hill Road in London. Looking away from the tube station the one on the right sold new model railway equipment and the one on the left was full of used stuff. He later bought out the Bassett Lowke shops after Whale left the company.

On Beatties' retirement the business was bought by Richard Kohnstamm Ltd (best known as Riko and also the Tamiya importers) who then expanded it into a major chain. At some point the focus on model railways was dropped and Beatties became more like a general toy store.

Beatties bought the Toy and Model retailers Taylor & McKenna in 1987, they had 10 shops, the first one opened in Hemel Hempstead in 1960, and the second shop was opened in Aylesbury in Friars Square

The retail company Era Group plc owned Beatties by the end of its days as a retailer. By the late 1990s Beatties had 60 stores, in locations including the MetroCentre, Gateshead, and the Merry Hill Shopping Centre in the West Midlands. The company had an e-commerce website. The chain ran into financial trouble after an attempt to break into the already well-served video games market, where they struggled against well-established competitors.

On 14 March 2001 the company was placed into administration by its parent company ERA Group. Alan Bloom and Chris Hill, partners at Ernst & Young, were appointed as joint administrative receivers by Barclays Bank, at the request of Era. The shares of Era Group, which Beatties made up the largest part of, were suspended from the AIM list on 27 February 2001. In October 1999 some stores began to close. In July 2000 34 of the 60 stores were closed, and Era Group attempted to raise £5m through a share issue to help pay creditors. In March 2001, 13 of the remaining stores were sold to turnaround specialists Hilco, and the final 13 stores were closed, at the cost of more than 100 jobs. Modelzone acquired many of the former Beatties stores and also suffered a similar fate closing down in 2013. A museum-quality collection of heritage transport toys called "The Beatties Collection" was auctioned by Phillips with a reserve price of around £50,000.
