= Belfast City Centre =

Central business district of Belfast, Northern Ireland

Coordinates: 54.597°N 5.930°W

- Central Business District
- Location within Northern Ireland
- Irish grid reference: J338740
- District: City of Belfast
- Country: Northern Ireland
- Sovereign state: United Kingdom
- Post town: BELFAST
- Postcode district: BT?
- Dialling code: 028
- Police: Northern Ireland
- Fire: Northern Ireland
- Ambulance: Northern Ireland

Belfast City Centre is the central business district of Belfast, Northern Ireland.

The city centre was originally centred on the Donegall Street area. Donegall Street is now mainly a business area, but with expanding residential and entertainment development as part of the Cathedral Quarter scheme - St. Anne's, Belfast's Anglican cathedral is located here. The Roman Catholic cathedral St. Peter's is located a little to the west of the city centre.

Two of Belfast's three main newspapers - The Belfast Telegraph and The Irish News are also located nearby. The News Letter, which claims to be the oldest continually published English language daily newspaper still in existence, was originally located in the area at 55 Donegall Street, site of a massive Provisional IRA carbomb in March 1972, in which seven people died and 148 were injured.

The city centre is now centred on Donegall Square (location of the City Hall), Donegall Place, Royal Avenue, Castle Junction, High Street and surrounding streets and alleys.

== Redevelopment ==
Victoria Square completed in March 2008

Over the past decade the city Centre has seen expansive redevelopment. The Laganside Development includes the landmark Waterfront Hall, BT Tower, Hilton Hotel, Odyssey Complex and various riverside apartment complexes.

The Gasworks Business Park is owned by Belfast City Council and managed by the Councils Estates Management Unit. The site contains commercial offices, call centres, small business units, housing, cafés & restaurants, the Radisson Hotel and an award-winning public landscaped park. The Gasworks has been internationally recognised as a key example of brownfield regeneration in Europe and has won numerous awards in relation to all aspects of its development. The initial phase is now almost complete and the City Council are currently preparing a master plan in preparation for the commencement of Phase II development.

Victoria Square is a commercial, residential and leisure development in Belfast developed and constructed by Multi Development UK in over 6 years. At approximately 800,000 ft^{2} (75,000m^{2}) and costing £400m it is the biggest and one of the most expensive property developments ever undertaken in Northern Ireland. It opened on 6 March 2008. Its anchor tenant at nearly 200,000 ft^{2} (18,581m^{2}) is the largest House of Fraser that the retailer has opened in the UK (as opposed to taken over).

In March 2006, the government gave the go-ahead for a £300m regeneration of a run-down part of Belfast city centre, in the Cathedral Quarter, which could create up to 2,000 jobs. Plans include a new shopping centre, anchored by a department store. The project will not be completed until 2011. It is estimated that 1,000 people will help build the development and 2,000 will be employed there.

== Notable buildings ==
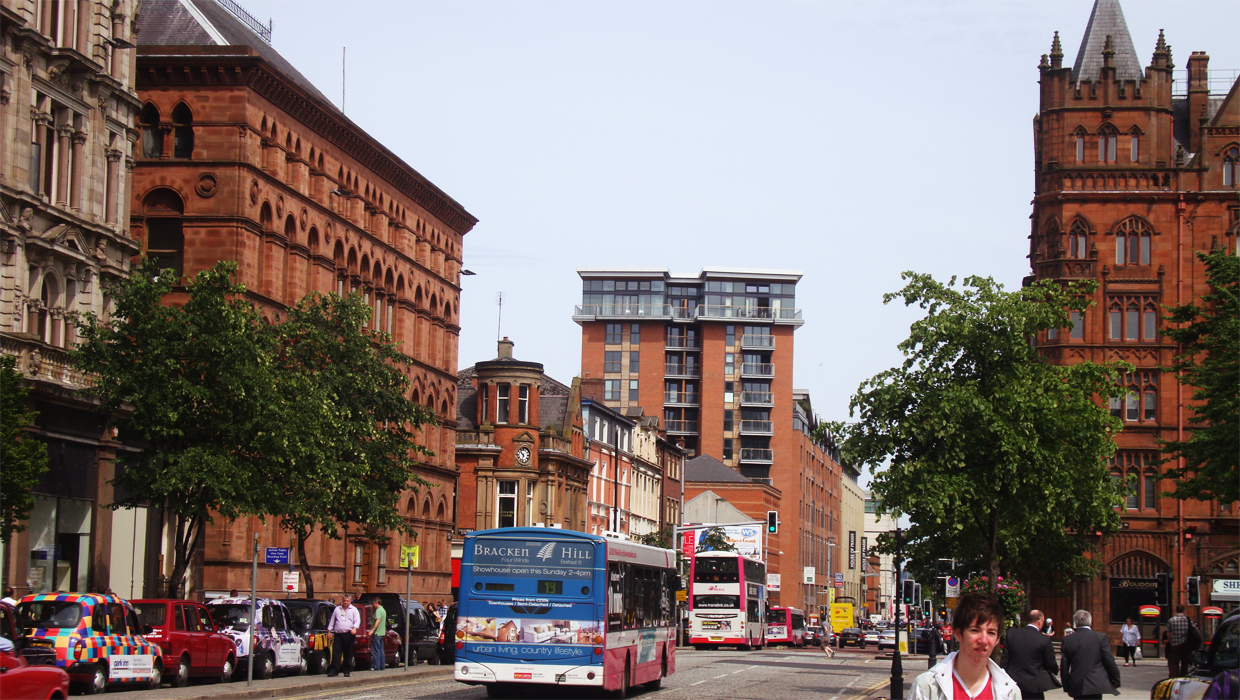
A view of Donegall Square North

- Albert Clock, Victoria Street
- City Hall, Donegall Square
- Linenhall Library, Donegall Square North
- The Obel Tower, Donegall Quay
- Belfast Metropolitan College, College Square East
- Royal Belfast Academical Institution (RBAI), College Square East
- St. George's Church, High Street
- St. George's Market, May Street
- The Ulster Hall, Bedford Street
- The Waterfront Hall, Lanyon Place
- Windsor House, Bedford Street
- Victoria Square

=== Bars and clubs ===
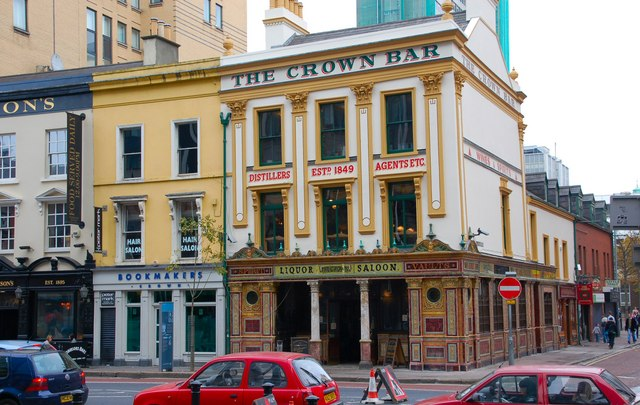
The Crown Liquor Saloon

- McHugh's Bar, Queen's Square
- The Crown Liquor Saloon, Great Victoria Street
- The Limelight, Ormeau Avenue
- The Northern Whig, Waring Street

== Rail Access ==
Northern Ireland Railways provide access on the Belfast Suburban Rail network with stations in proximity to the city centre.

- Belfast Lanyon Place
- Belfast Grand Central
- Botanic
- York Street
- City Hospital

== See also ==
- Charles Lanyon
- List of public art in Belfast
- Buildings and structures in Belfast
