= Ulster Reform Club =

Northern Ireland dining, business and social club

- Formation: 1885
- Type: Social
- Location: Royal Avenue, Belfast
- Members: c. 870
- President: A.E. Wells
- Chief Executive: Alex Graham
- Website: ulsterreformclub.com

The Ulster Reform Club is a business, social and dining club in Northern Ireland.

The club's clubhouse, which opened on New Year's Day 1885, occupies a conspicuous position on Royal Avenue in the centre of Belfast. In its décor, furnishings and objets d'art, the clubhouse retains historical associations.

== Facilities ==
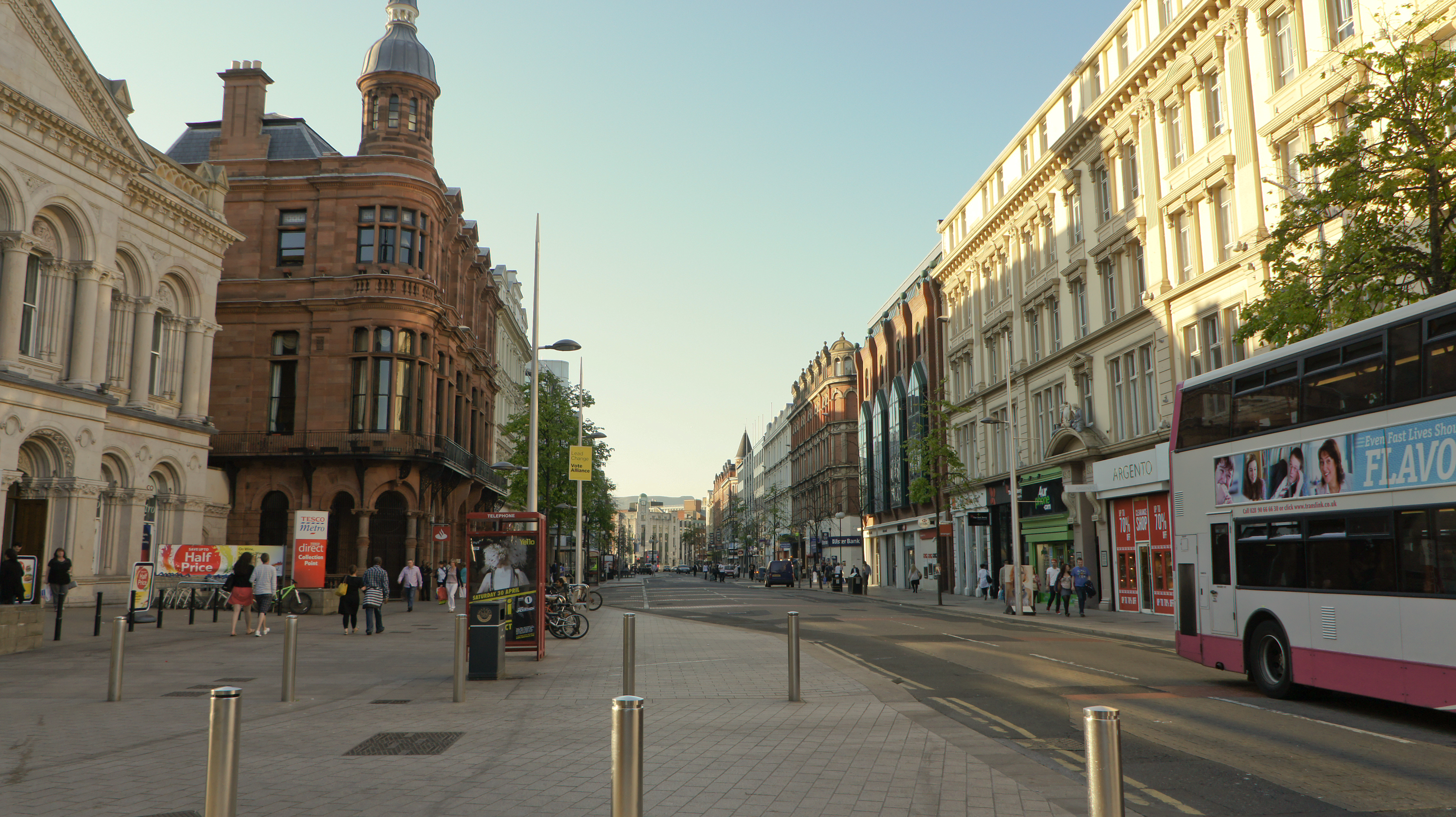
The Ulster Reform Club, the red sandstone building to the left

- Members' bar
- Dining room
- Private dining rooms
- Business room
- Snooker room
- Fitness suite
- Reading room

== Honorary Members ==
- Marquess of Hartington 1885
- Joseph Chamberlain 1887
- Sir Henry James, Q.C. 1891
- The 1st Marquess of Dufferin and Ava 1896
- James Johnston 1904
- Sir Edward Carson, K.C. 1921
- The 1st Viscount Craigavon 1928
- The 7th Marquess of Londonderry 1930
- Lt. Col. F.H. Crawford, C.B.E., J.P. 1941
- J. M. Andrews, D.L. 1943
- The 3rd Duke of Abercorn 1946
- Sir Basil Brooke, 5th Bt., C.B.E., M.C. 1950
- Sir Cecil McKee 1984
