= Victoria Square Shopping Centre =

Shopping complex in Belfast, Northern Ireland

Victoria Square
- Location: Belfast, Northern Ireland
- Coordinates: 54.5983°N 5.9253°W
- Opened: 6 March 2008; 18 years ago
- Developer: Multi Development UK
- Owner: Commerzbank AG
- Num. of stores: 93
- Num. of anchor tenants: 1
- Floor area: 75,000 m^{2} (810,000 sq ft)
- Floors: 7
- Parking: 1000
- Website: victoriasquare.com

Victoria Square is a shopping complex located in Belfast, Northern Ireland. The area includes over 55+ shops, 16 restaurants and an Odeon cinema. Opened on 6 March 2008, Victoria Square is a commercial, residential and leisure development that took 6 years to build.

Its anchor tenant is the largest House of Fraser (now Frasers) that the retailer has opened in the UK, at nearly 200,000 square feet (19,000 m^{2}).

== Design ==
Victoria Square was developed by Multi Development UK Ltd. The architects were Building Design Partnership and T+T Design, the in house architects of Multi Corporation. At approximately 800,000 square feet (74,000 m^{2}) and costing £400m, Victoria Square is the biggest and was one of the most expensive property developments ever undertaken in Northern Ireland.

Victoria Square Main Atrium 2010

An element of the development is two covered, multi-level streets linked to the glass dome, which measures 37 m in diameter and 45 m in height. A public square covered entirely by the glass dome serves as the hub of the entire area. The Jaffe Fountain, constructed in the 1870s by former Lord Mayor Otto Jaffe in memory of his father, has been restored to its original location in Victoria Square. There are pedestrian links to nearby business, nightlife and shopping streets on Laganside, Donegall Place, Royal Avenue and Ann Street.

A large section of the center's roof is covered in Sedum in an attempt to reduce the carbon footprint of Victoria Square.

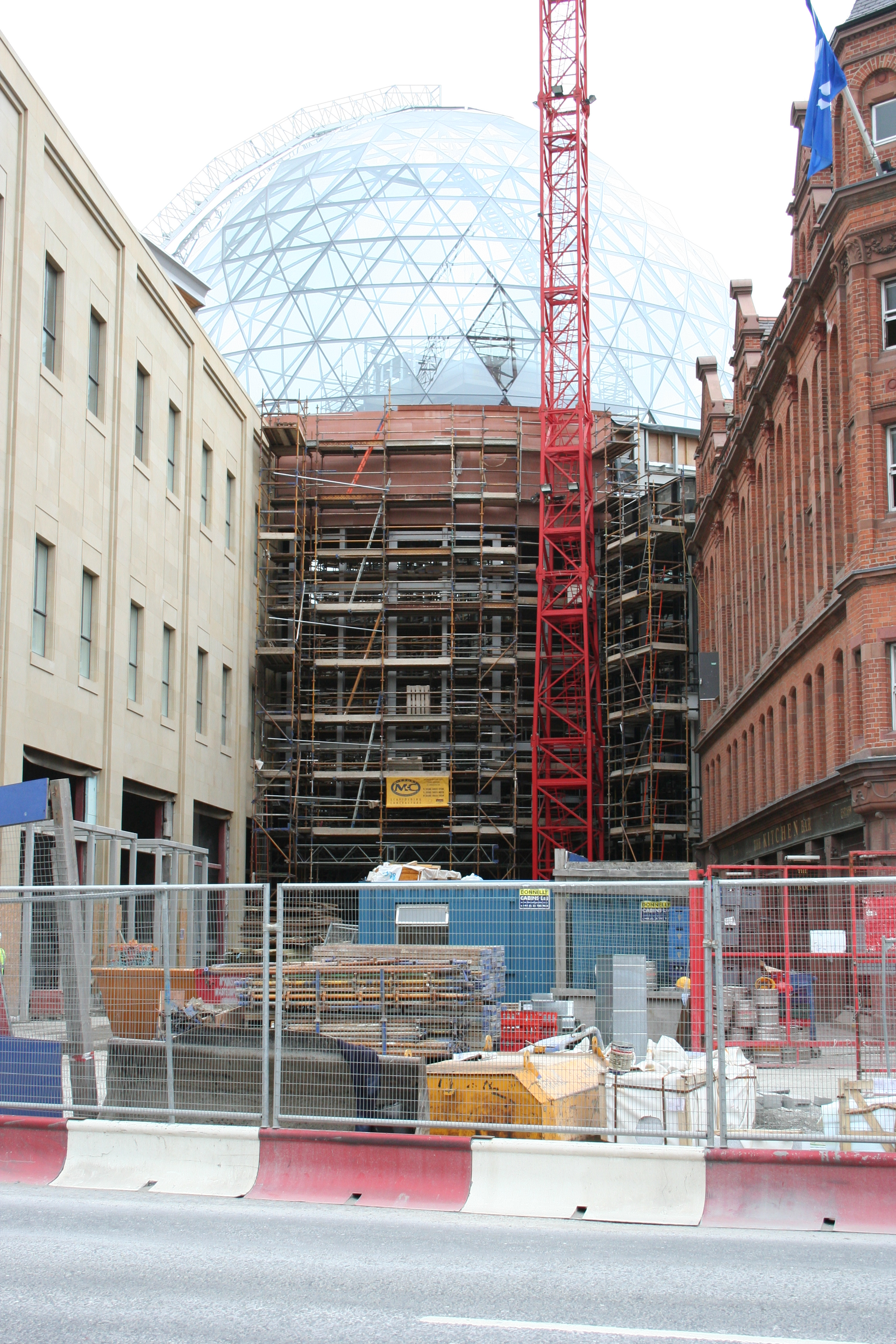
Construction of Victoria Square development August 2007

== Facilities ==
The development spans approximately 800,000 ft² (75,000m²) of retail over four floors. Q-Park provides 2 levels of basement parking with approx. 1,000 car spaces. The retail space includes 98 unit shops, with leisure units including an 8 screen Odeon Cinema. There are also restaurants, bars and cafés. The development also included 106 apartments.

There is a stop for Metro bus services 1, 2, 11, 12, 13, 14, 96 and 696 at the eastern entrance as well as nearby stops for Glider G1 and G2 and Metro bus services 3, 4, 5, 6, 94, 600, 648, and 649 and Ulsterbus services 263, 563, 566 and 568.

Both Lanyon Place and Belfast Grand Central stations are within walking distance.

== Events ==
On 24 November 2013, a car bomb detonated outside a Victoria Square car park. There were no injuries.

== Gallery ==
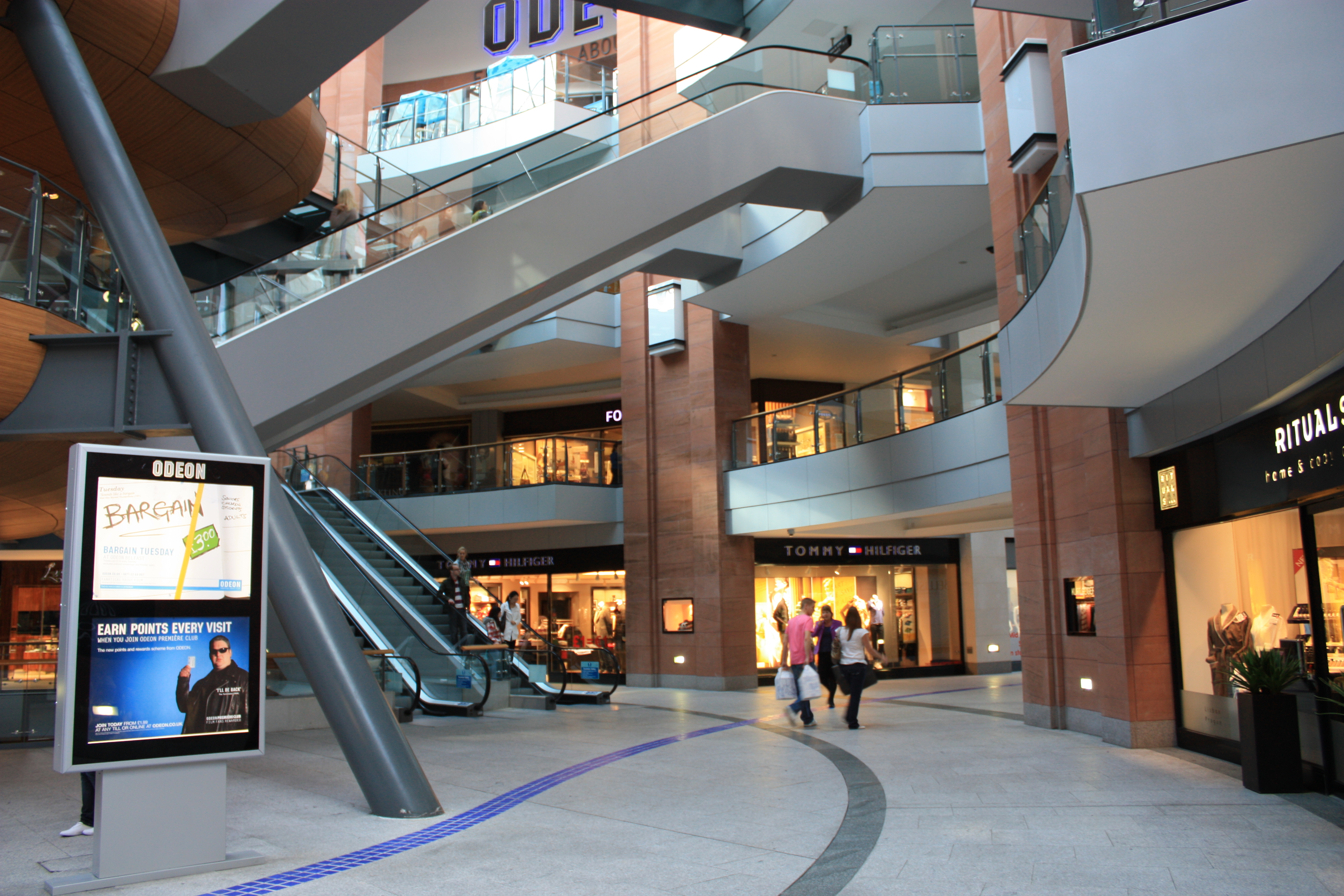
Victoria Square, October 2009

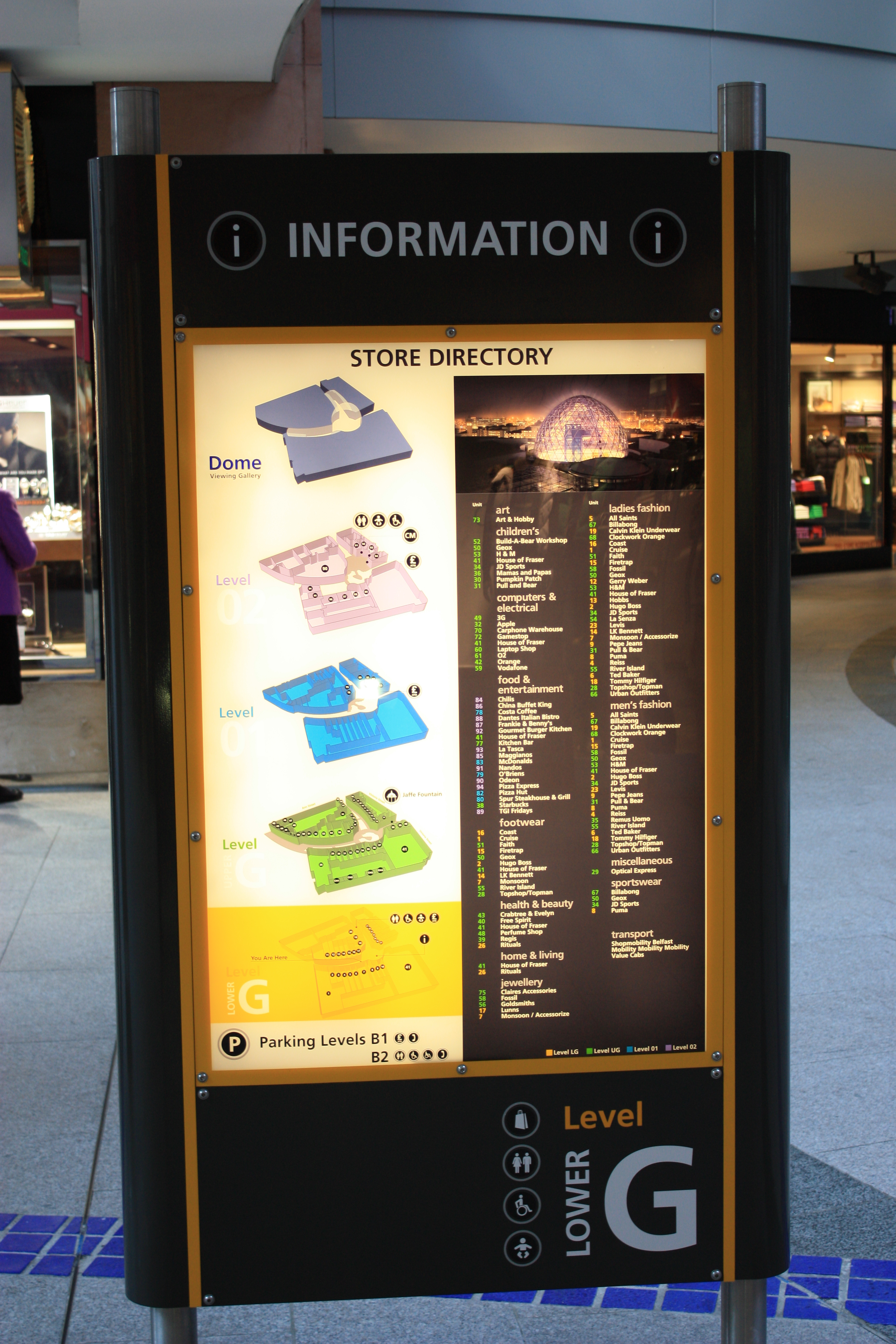
Information board, Victoria Square, October 2009

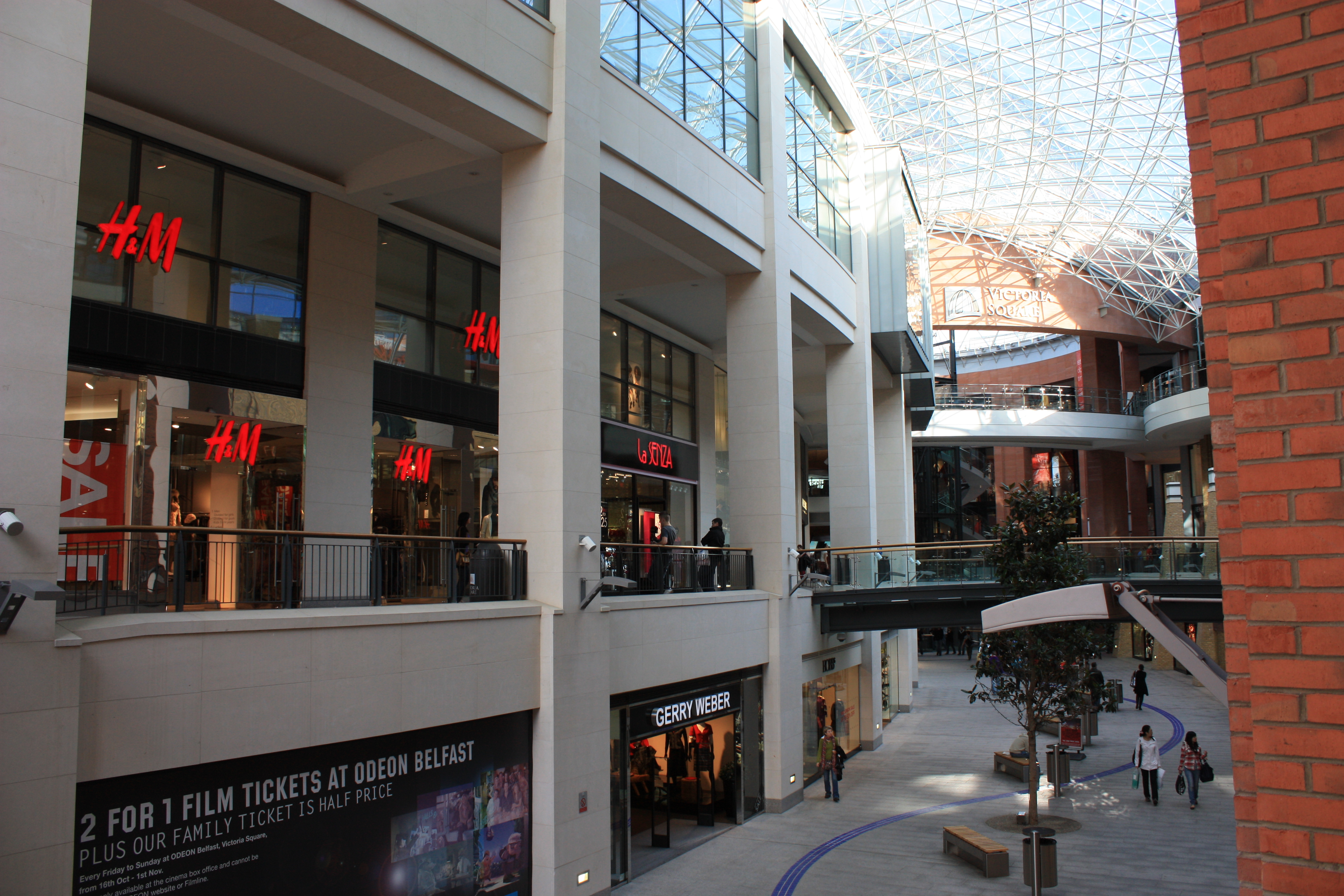
Victoria Square, October 2009

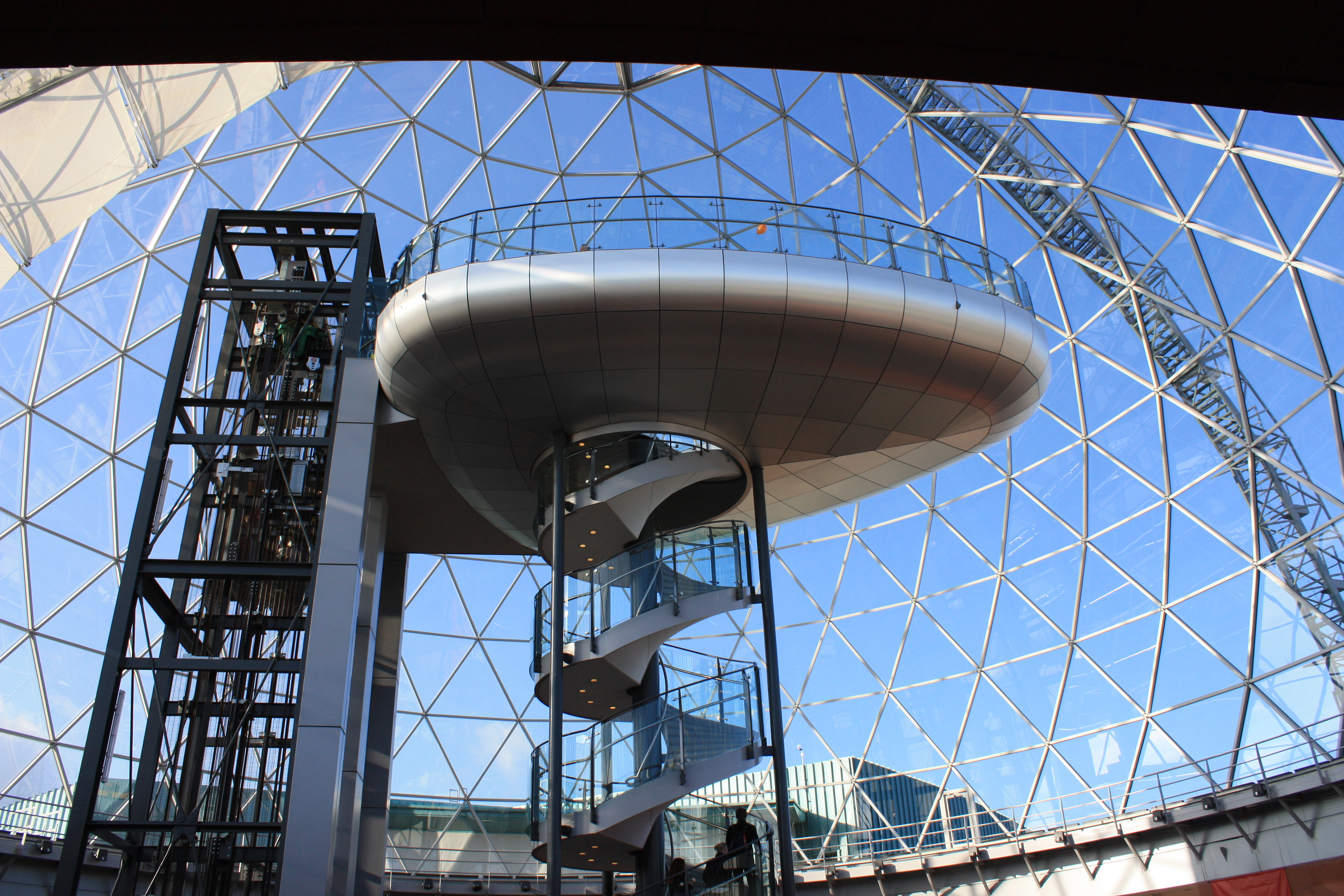
Viewing gallery, Victoria Square, October 2009
