= Ripmax =

British RC model supplier

Ripmax Ltd
- Company type: Private limited company
- Industry: Distribution
- Predecessor: Ripmax Plc
- Founded: Camden Town, United Kingdom, (April 7, 1949)
- Headquarters: Enfield, United Kingdom
- Products: Radio-controlled models
- Website: www.ripmax.com

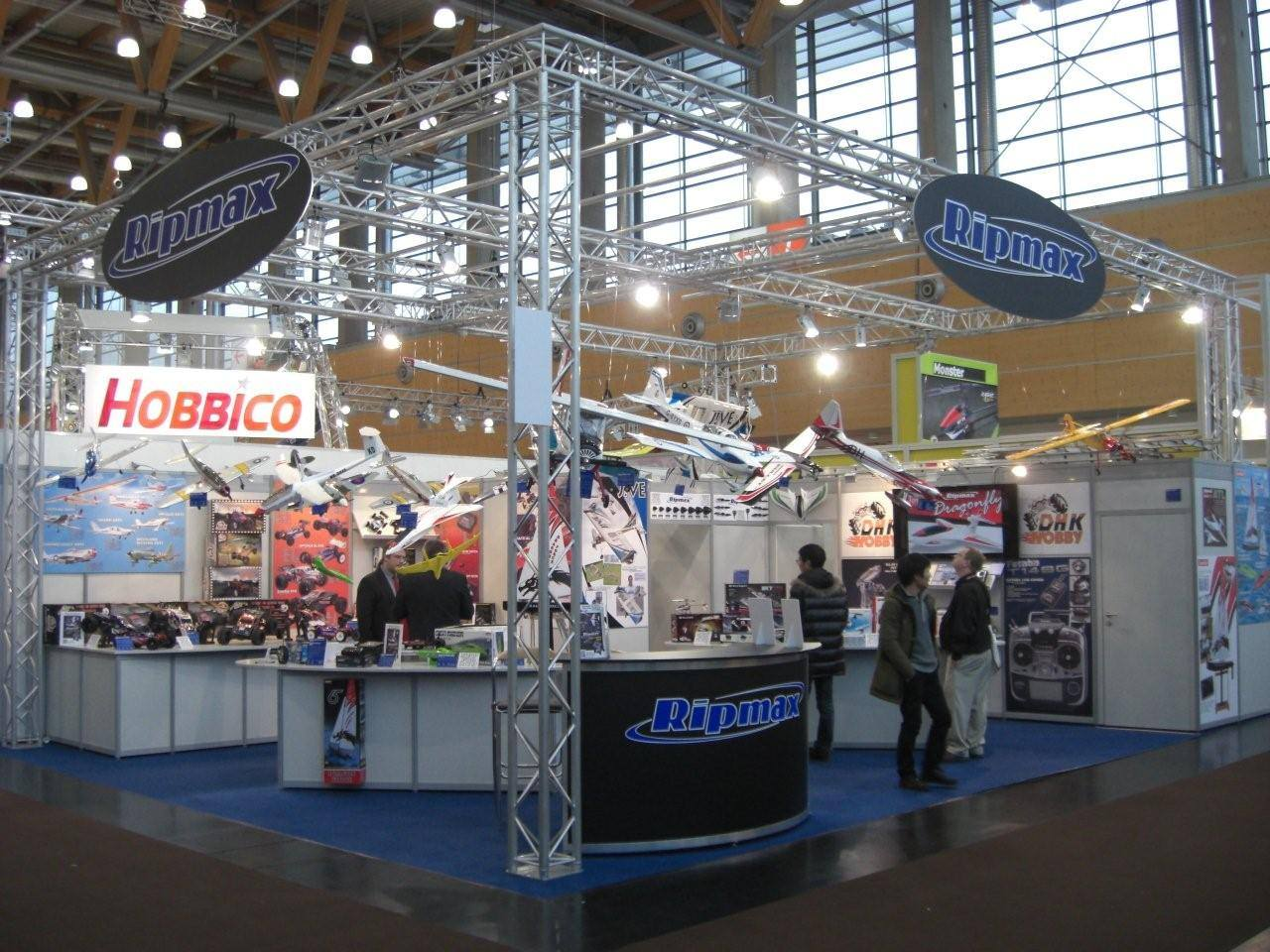
Trade stand at Spielwarenmesse toy show.

Ripmax Limited is a British supplier of radio-controlled models and related components, based in Enfield, north London.

== History ==
The company was founded in 1949 as a toy and model shop in Camden Town, with a focus on model boats. The shop later expanded into distribution, adding warehousing and additional staff to the company, eventually employing about 70 people. As Ripmax Plc, it merged with Irvine Ltd in 2003 to create Ripmax Ltd. In July 2013, Ripmax bought wholesale toy distributor Amerang from the Modelzone Group, which was under administration, saving the jobs of all 18 remaining employees of Amerang.
