= McHugh's Bar =

Public house in Belfast, Northern Ireland

Coordinates: 54.601°N 5.923°W

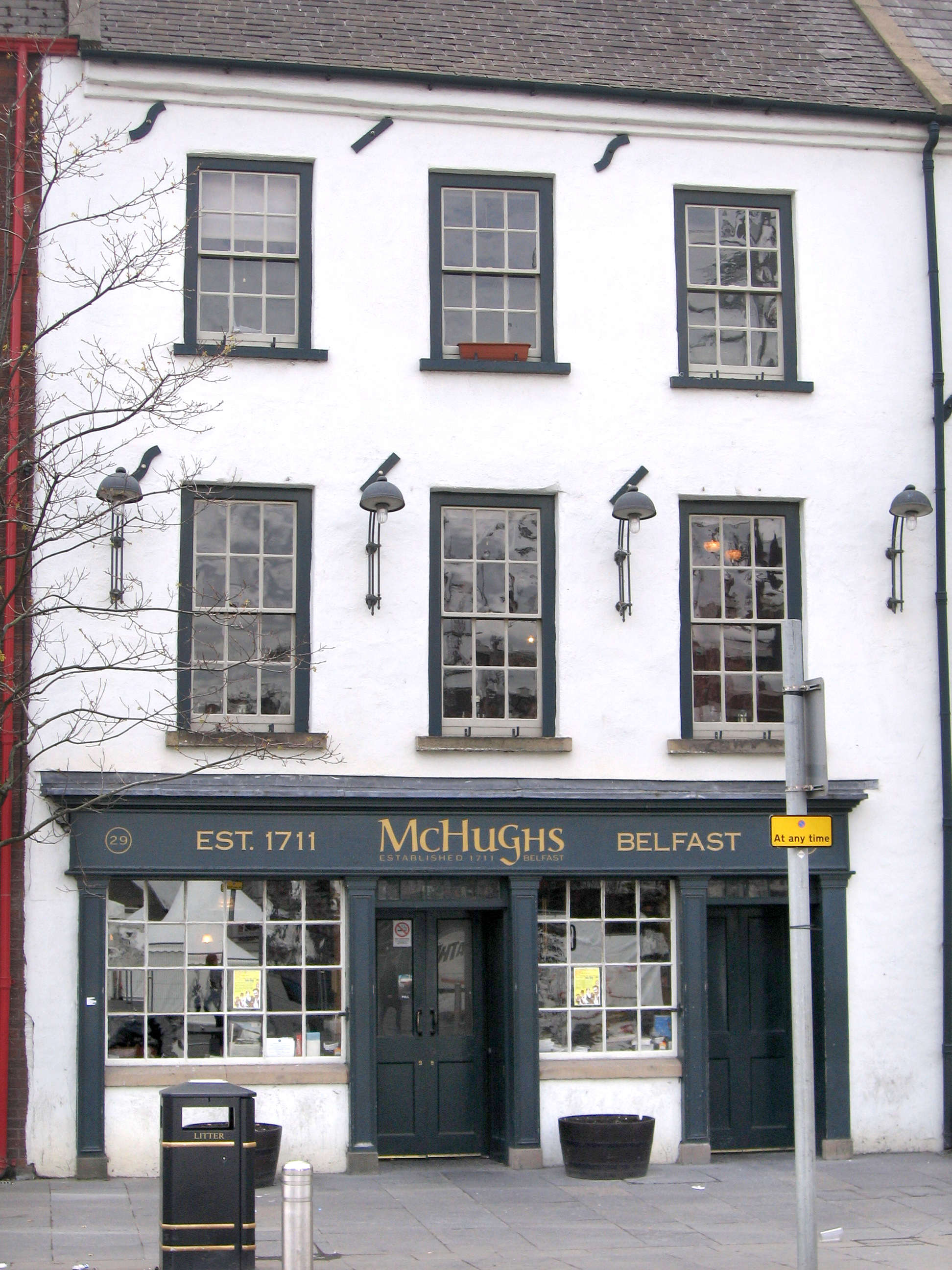
McHughs Bar

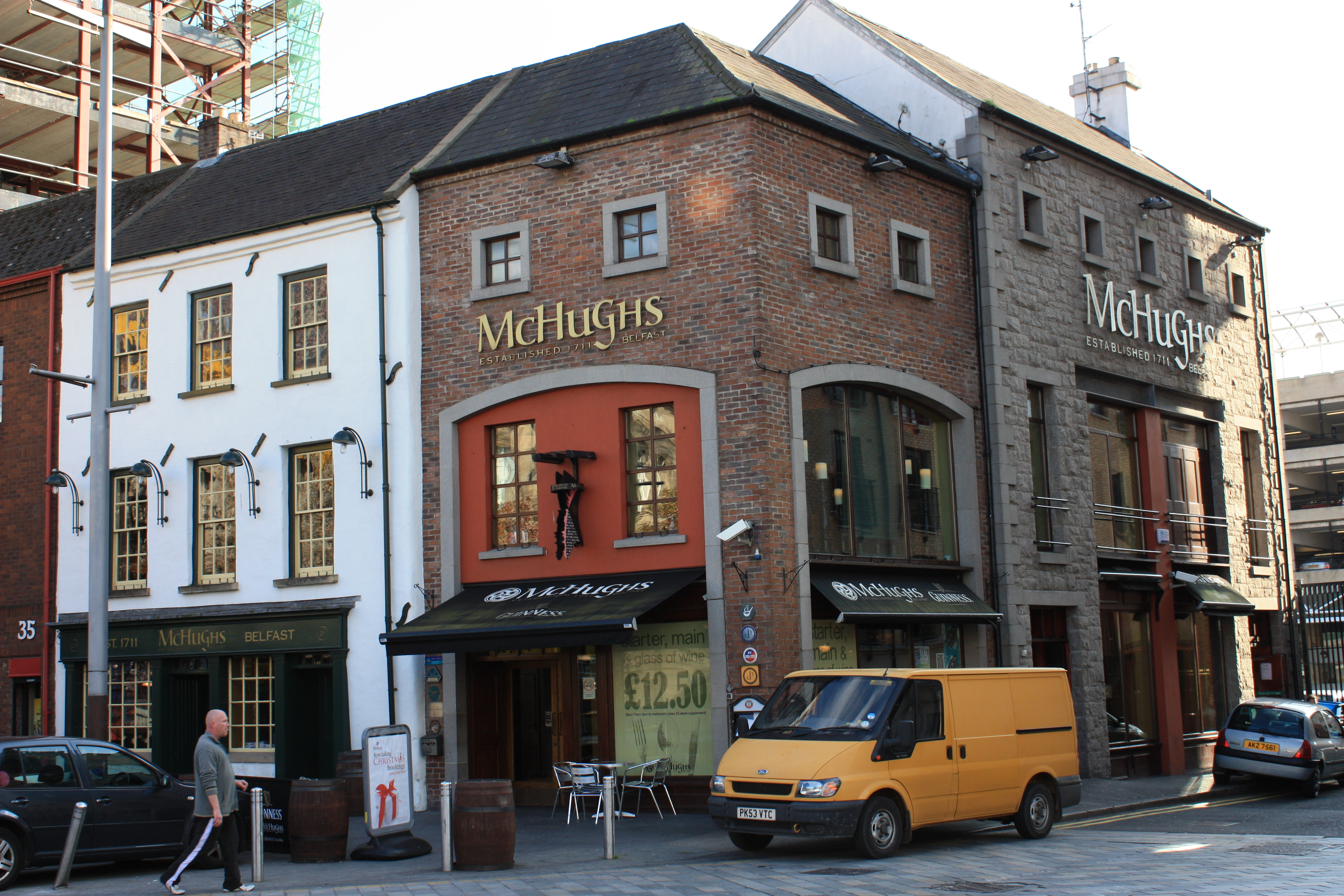
McHughs, October 2009

McHugh's Bar is a pub on Queen's Square in Belfast City Centre, Northern Ireland. It is one of the city's best known pubs and the oldest building in Belfast.

== History ==
McHugh's was originally built as a private dwelling on the old Town Dock around 1711, probably later, though the real date is not officially established. Some time after this the dock was demolished and the River Farset was covered, although it still runs under Queen's Square and the adjacent High Street. Between 1715 and 1725 it was converted to a small pub.

McHugh's has been given a Grade A Listed Building status by the Environment and Heritage Service.

== Renovation and current status ==
The original McHugh's bar was named after well-known Belfast publican called Pat McHugh (Pat the hat) In the 1990s the bar underwent a £1m renovation and expansion, enclosing the neighbouring DuBarry’s Bar, an establishment with a dubious reputation. The previous owners are Botanic Inns, was one of Belfast's largest pub and restaurant companies, whose establishments include The Botanic Inn, The Apartment, The Fly, The King's Head, Madison's, Ryan's Bar and Grill, The Northern Whig and The Globe.

The expansion included a brand new section, but the existing building retains much of its original features including the massive 18th century oak beams.
