= Grand Central Hotel Belfast =

Coordinates: 54.5952°N 5.9315°W

The name Grand Central Hotel Belfast refers to two separate hotels at different locations in the city. The first opened in 1893 and was converted to a military barracks in 1972, before being demolished in the late 1980s. The second is a converted office building nearby, previously known as Windsor House, which was converted to a hotel and opened on 20 June 2018.

== First Grand Central Hotel ==
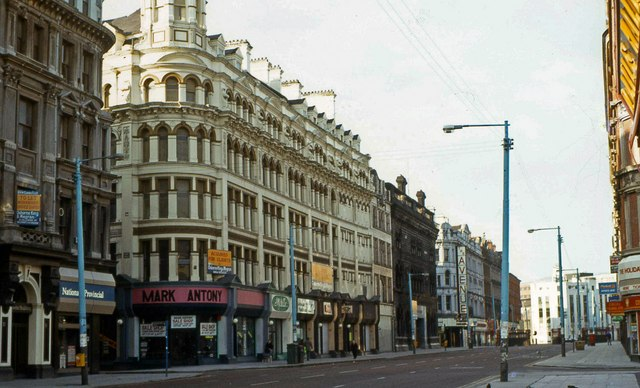
The first Grand Central Hotel, in the mid-1980s

The first Grand Central Hotel was located on Royal Avenue in Belfast, Northern Ireland, and opened in 1893. The hotel contained around 200 guest bedrooms and hosted many famous guests, including the Beatles and the Rolling Stones in the 1960s.

The hotel was taken over by the British Army in 1972 for use as a military base from which to patrol the city centre during the height of the Troubles. The troops based there were protected by anti-rocket screens constructed around the front of the building on the main street to repel everything from bricks and bottles to paint and blast bombs. One of the most bombarded hotels in the world it was attacked more than 150 times by the Provisional IRA and other groups.

In the late 1980s, the hotel was no longer required as a military base. It was acquired by developers and demolished, along with a neighbouring building, to make way for the CastleCourt shopping centre which was completed in 1990.

== Second Grand Central Hotel ==
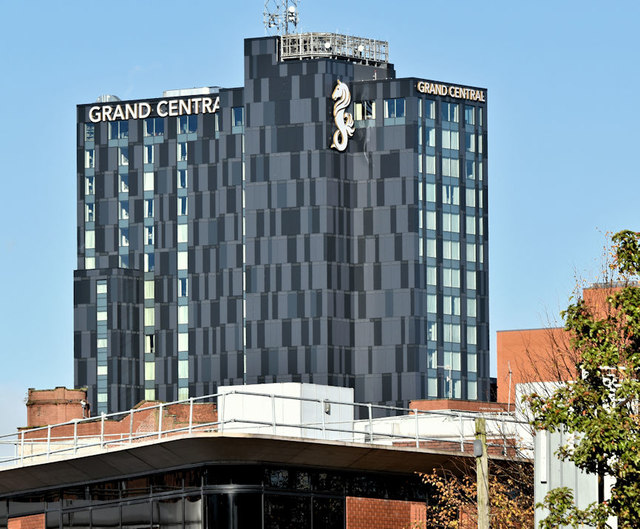
Grand Central Hotel, Oct 2018

The second Grand Central Hotel was originally constructed as Windsor House (officially known as 9-15 Bedford Street), a 23-storey, 80 m high-rise building on Bedford Street in Belfast, Northern Ireland. Following a £30m refurbishment beginning in 2016, the new hotel opened on 20 June 2018 as the Grand Central Hotel.

== See also ==
- List of tallest buildings and structures in Belfast
- Architecture of Belfast
