= Royal Avenue, Belfast =

Street in Belfast, Northern Ireland

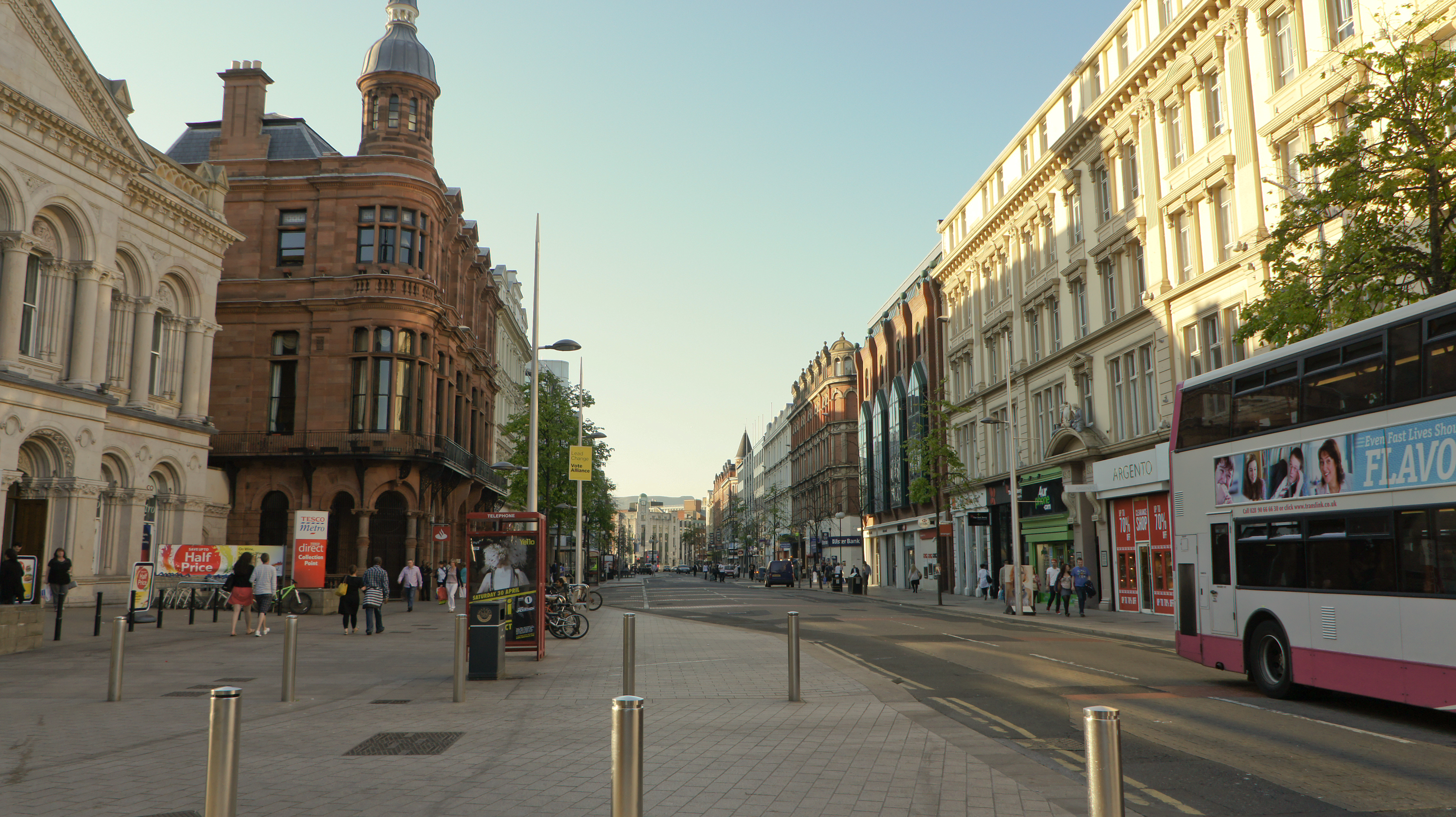
Royal Avenue in 2011, from its lower end.

Royal Avenue is a street in the heart of Belfast city centre, Northern Ireland. It runs for about 500 metres from the junction with Castle Place and Donegall Place to the junction with Donegall Street. It lies between the Cathedral Quarter and the Smithfield and Union Quarter of the city. It has been the city's principal shopping thoroughfare since its establishment in 1881. Today Royal Avenue is one of Belfast's main commercial centres and is home to the £40 million shopping complex CastleCourt.

== Location ==
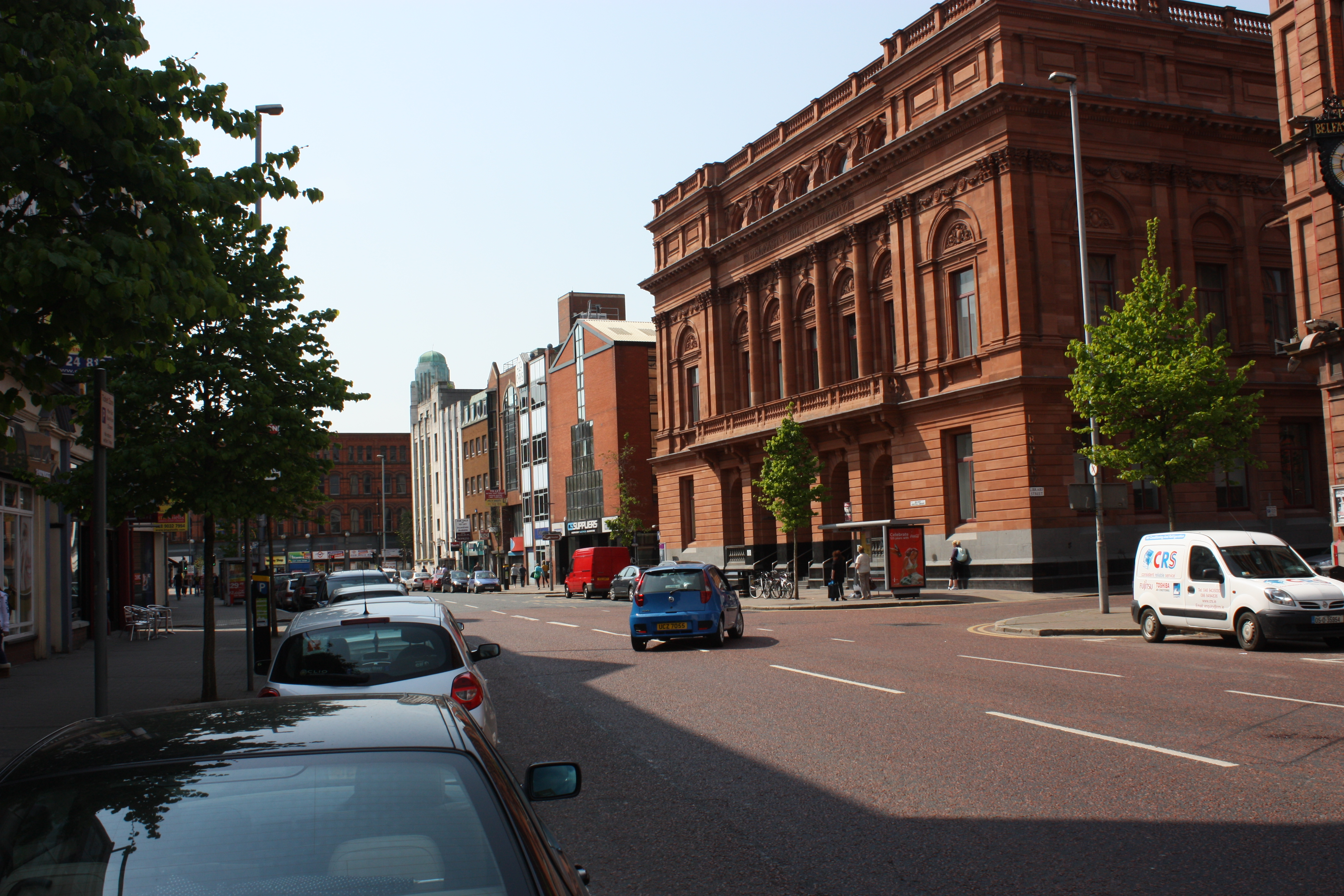
A view of upper Royal Avenue, 2011. On the right is the Belfast Central Library, which opened in 1888.

Beginning from the Donegall Place junction with Castle Place and Castle Street, which is the hub of Belfast city centre, the road runs north to the North Street crossing where the former Bank of Ireland once stood. A fire in summer of 2018 caused the front part of the building to burn leaving only the back of the building standing. Royal Avenue then angles northeast to the Donegall Street intersection continuing in a northeasterly direction as York Street.

Looking south on Royal Avenue, there is an imposing vista of Belfast City Hall and Donegall Square. The Anglican St. Anne's Cathedral in Donegall Street is adjacent to its northern end. It has many Victorian and Edwardian buildings, including the Belfast Central Library and the Haymarket Building, along with newer, modern structures and shopping complexes. At the northern end was the headquarters for the Belfast Telegraph newspaper. Like the rest of the city centre, Royal Avenue has seen much redevelopment since the Troubles officially ended in 1998, and the city embarked on a major urban renewal project.

== History ==
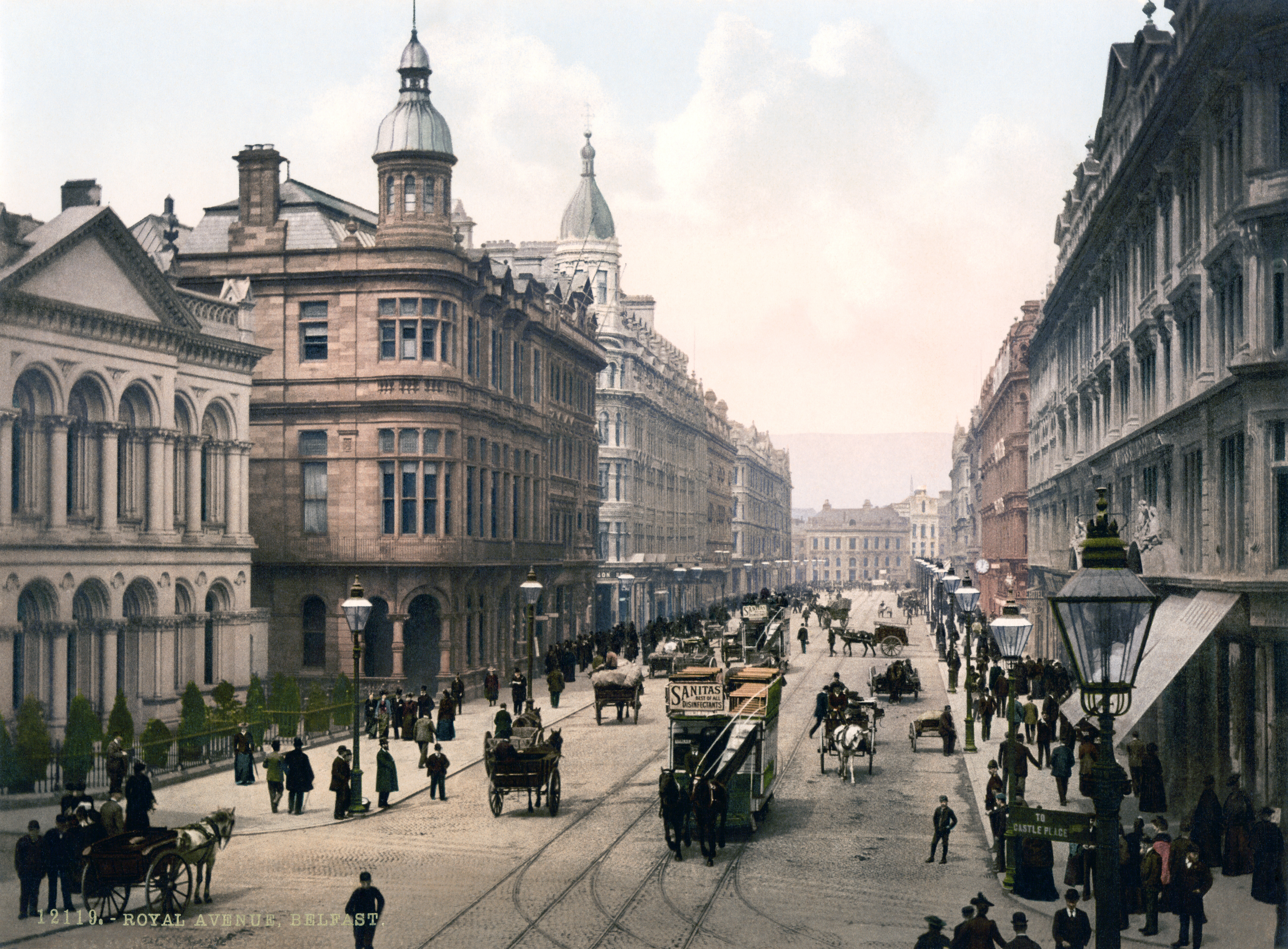
Royal Avenue, 1898, viewed from Castle Junction.

The upper part was formerly named John Street, and the lower part was named Hercules Street after Sir Hercules Langford. Royal Avenue was established in 1881. Since that time, it has served as Belfast's principal shopping thoroughfare, and today it is lined with many leading department stores and top name shops.

The city's most prestigious and elegant hotel, the Grand Central Hotel, was on the street before it was demolished in the late 1980s to make room for the £40 million shopping complex, Westfield CastleCourt. The site on which it was built by John Robb was originally intended to be a central railway terminus; however, due to hesitation on the part of town councillors, Robb constructed a 200-room luxury hotel instead. The hotel, which first opened its doors on 1 June 1893, became the "social hub of Belfast" and provided a temporary home for many illustrious guests, including King Leopold III of Belgium, Sir Winston Churchill, Gene Autry, Bob Hope, The Beatles, and the Rolling Stones. The latter's presence inside the hotel in the mid-1960s nearly provoked a riot as hundreds of fans gathered in Royal Avenue to catch a glimpse of the bandmembers, who watched the chaotic scene taking place below from the hotel's upper windows. A year after the hotel closed down in 1971, it was converted into a fortified military barracks serving as battalion headquarters for regiments in the British Army that were based in Belfast city centre. The former hotel's Bridal Suite became the Army's operational centre for over ten years.

Royal Avenue was filmed from a horse-drawn tramcar on 27 May 1901. The film is extant and shows the street bustling with shoppers, workers, trams, carts, bicycles, and wagons. During the 1907 Belfast Dock strike, Royal Avenue was used as one of the principal thoroughfares for the passage of traction engines driven by blackleg carters to deliver goods from the docks into the city centre. The blacklegs had to be escorted by the Royal Irish Constabulary (RIC) to prevent them from being attacked by flying pickets.

On 29 October 1935, Royal Avenue was packed with thousands of mourners as the funeral cortege of Edward Carson made its way along the street. The road was hit by bombs in the Belfast Blitz when the German Luftwaffe bombarded the city on the night of 15/16 April 1941 in an aerial attack that involved up to 200 bombers and lasted for six and a half hours; many of the buildings sustained considerable damage, although the destruction was much less severe than what was wrought in nearby Donegall and York streets. The Germans returned to bombard the city in another raid on the night of 4/5 May. Royal Avenue was spared from the excessive damage visited upon adjacent streets which were gutted by fire. It is one of the traditional routes used by the Orange Order on their annual 12 July parade.

=== The Troubles ===
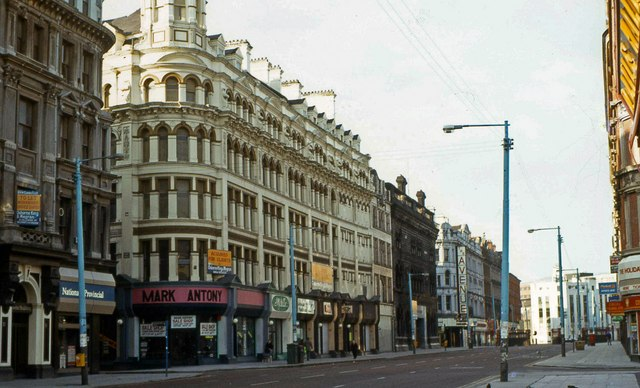
The former Grand Central Hotel, which was converted into a British Army barracks in 1972, was the site of many bombing attacks during The Troubles.

Throughout the Troubles, Royal Avenue was targeted by the Provisional IRA due to its economic importance as a commercial zone and the presence of the British Army military barracks. The barracks itself was bombed many times in the mid-1970s, despite the anti-rocket metal mesh put up to fortify the edifice. Security gates placed at the junction of Royal Avenue and Donegall Place were closed every evening at 6:00 p.m., sealing off the area by what was known locally as a "ring of steel".

Shortly after midnight on 25 November 1975, Francis Crossin, a 34-year-old Catholic civilian, was abducted by the notorious Shankill Butchers gang. He was taken from Library Street, which leads immediately off Royal Avenue at the Central Library. Crossin was walking down the upper part of Library Street towards Royal Avenue when he was hit over the head with a wheel brace, then dragged into a waiting black taxi where he sustained a vicious beating. He was found, with his throat deeply slashed, in an entry near Bisley Street on the Shankill Road. Crossin became the first victim of the lethal gang led by Lenny Murphy. Crossin, who lived in the Suffolk district of south-west Belfast, had been walking home after spending the evening in the Holy Cross Bowling Club in the Ardoyne area of North Belfast from where his family originated.

On 24 February 1988 two Ulster Defence Regiment (UDR) soldiers, James Cummings and Fred Starrett, were killed when a 200-pound remote-controlled IRA bomb, hidden behind hoardings on a construction site, detonated at a Royal Avenue security gate guarded by the UDR. The blast caused considerable damage to the area surrounding the bomb site.

Royal Avenue was yet again attacked by the IRA on 1 January 1993 when an explosive device containing one pound of Semtex was left inside a hairdresser's salon but the device was successfully defused.

== Royal Avenue today ==
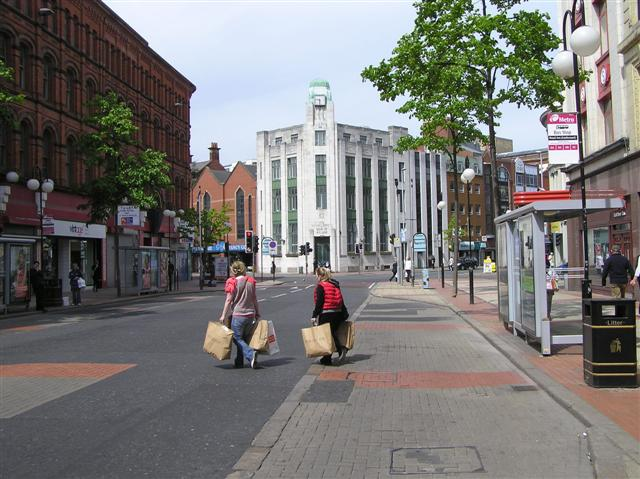
Royal Avenue in 2009, looking north, with the former Bank of Ireland in the background. The Art Deco building, unofficially renamed the "People's Bank" in 2012, is on the North Street intersection.

Royal Avenue is one of the main commercial centres in Belfast. Shops currently on the street include branches of Primark, H&M, and Schuh, as well as major banks including Santander UK, HSBC, and the Nationwide Building Society. Westfield CastleCourt, a major shopping centre owned by the Westfield Group, is also on Royal Avenue, and as of 2023, it hosts over 100 stores, including New Look, Superdrug, Burton, Argos, Games Workshop, and Virgin Media. The centre occupies the former site of the Grand Central Hotel.

The ornate building at 2 Royal Avenue was the former home of the Provincial Bank of Ireland which was erected in 1869. After its closure in 1989, the building was occupied until 2021 by a Tesco store. It was then refurbished as a social facility by Belfast City Council. Next door at 4 Royal Avenue is located the Ulster Reform Club. It was established in 1982 through a merger of the Ulster and Reform clubs, but, tracing its roots through the latter organisation back to 1880.

The Art Deco building at the junction of North Street and Royal Avenue, which was formerly the headquarters of the Bank of Ireland before being left derelict, was taken over by the Occupy movement in early 2012. They since took to referring to the building as the "People's Bank". The group left the building ten months later.

Around 2008 calls came from certain quarters, including former Lord Mayor of Belfast Jim Rodgers, for the pedestrianisation of Royal Avenue following a number of road traffic accidents on the street including a Dunmurry teenager, Ciara Park, being knocked down and killed. The street has since been partly pedestrianised. Many scenes in the 2011 comedy film Killing Bono were shot in Royal Avenue to recreate Dublin as it appeared in the late 1970s/early 1980s.
