= Hawkin's Bazaar =

1973–2021 British novelty gift and toy shop

Hawkin’s Bazaar

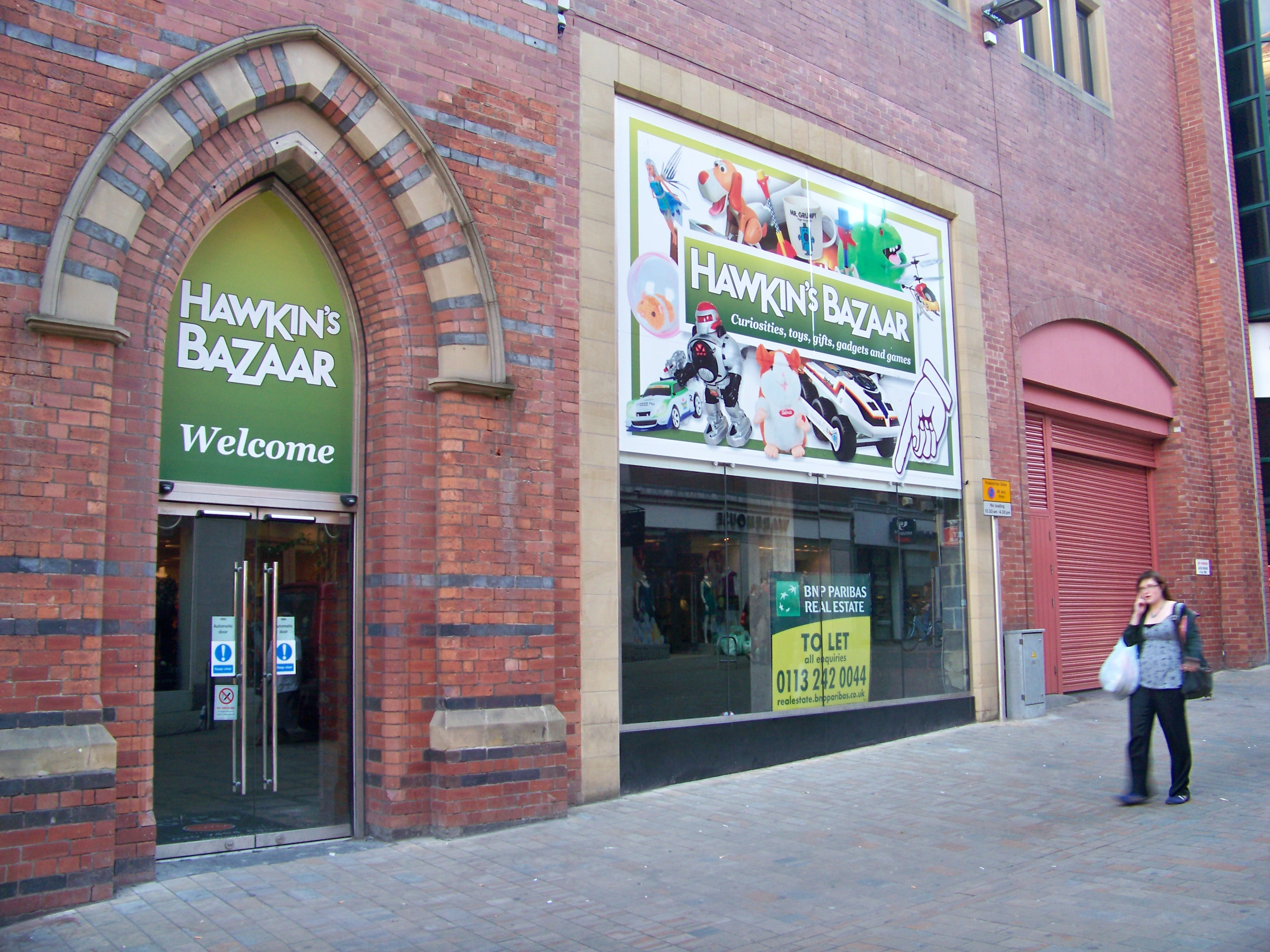
- A now-closed branch of Hawkin's Bazaar on Lands Lane in Leeds
- Company type: Limited company
- Industry: Retail
- Founded: 1973; 53 years ago Halesworth, Suffolk
- Founder: Sid Templer
- Defunct: 22 November 2021
- Fate: Acquired and folded into Menkind
- Successor: Menkind
- Headquarters: Yare House, Norwich, Norfolk, United Kingdom
- Number of locations: 18
- Area served: England
- Key people: Tom Straw and Simon Thomas (administrators)
- Products: Toys; gadgets; gifts
- Parent: Menkind
- Website: www.hawkinsltd.co.uk

Hawkin's Bazaar Ltd was a British novelty gift and toy shop chain based in Norwich, England. It offered a range of unusual toys, gifts, gadgets and curiosities. They sourced out-of-the-ordinary products and offered something different, a range of toys and gifts meant to appeal to many ages and tastes.

== History ==
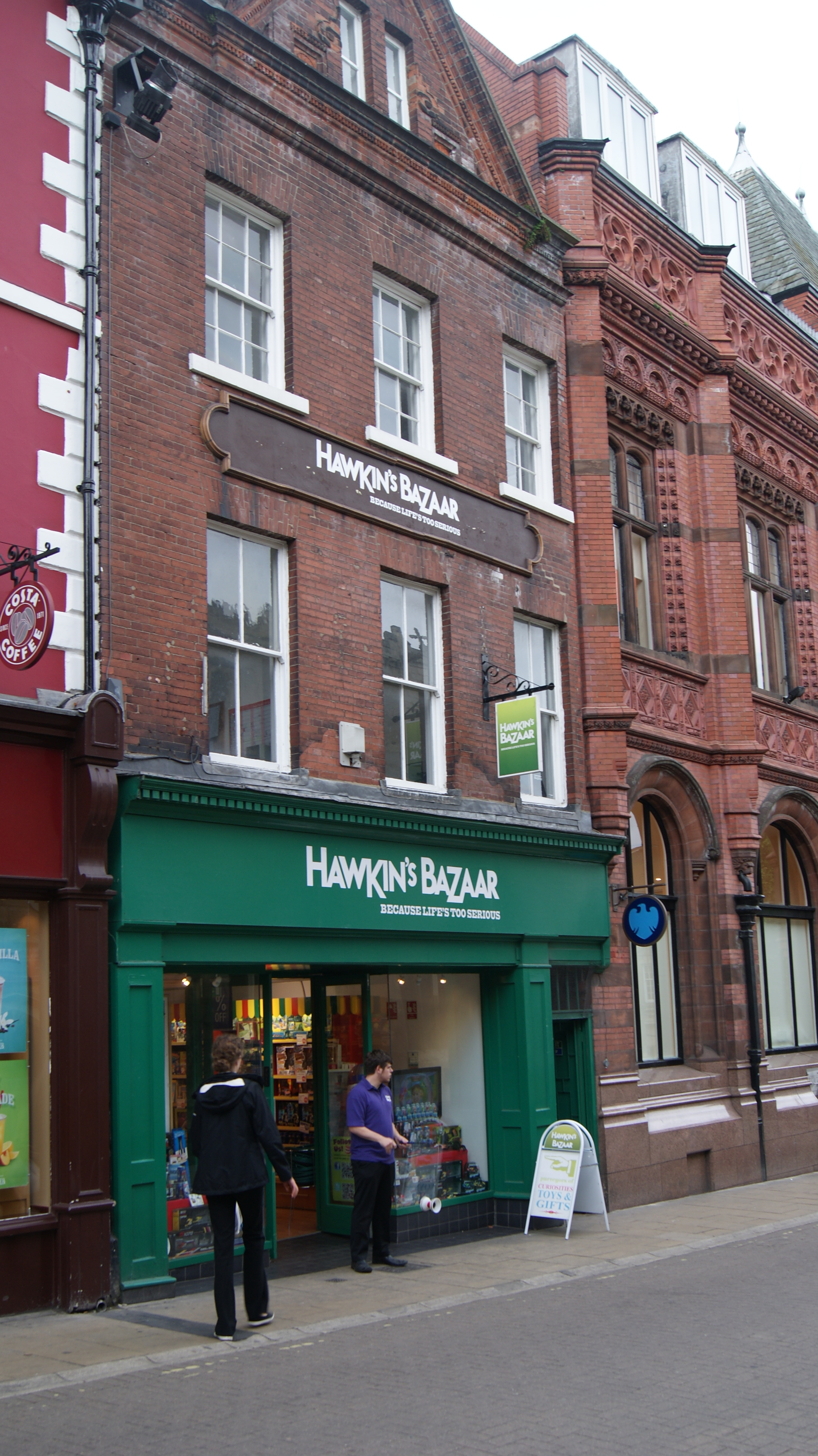
A branch of Hawkin's Bazaar on High Ousegate, in York

The company known as Hawkin's Bazaar Ltd started life as a niche mail order toy company founded by Sid Templer in 1973 in Halesworth, Suffolk. The name of the company at that time, TOBAR, was from the first few letters of his son's forenames, Toby and Barnaby. Tobar remains the name of the parent company to this day.

In 1976, the mail order company moved premises into an old disused public house, formerly named the Hawk Inn, and decided to adapt the name for themselves as Hawkin's & Co; Bazaar was added to the name later.

In 1989, the company moved premises again to a former farm, Elm House in St Margaret South Elmham; Toby took over the running of the company from his father, Sid. It was also around this time that the company opened its first retail shop in Salisbury. In 1998, the company launched their websites, shortly after beginning to open retail locations across the United Kingdom. Also in the 1990s, the company began to sell into the European markets and opened a European wholesale branch, TOBAR France, in 2010.

In 2007, the company moved to a £10 million facility in Worlingham, before moving to Norfolk in 2013. Also in 2007, they launched a sub-brand, Stocking Fillers.

2013 marked the company's 40th year in business. Whilst a lot had changed since Hawkin's Bazaar launched as a mail order service, the company still referred to its original values with taglines such as "Unusual gifts for every occasion since 1973" and "Suppliers to Father Christmas since 1973" adorning their mail order catalogues and other communications.

In addition to high street shops and mail order catalogues, the company continued to operate online. Its website was updated and re-launched in August 2012.

=== 2012 administration ===
On 23 January 2012, Hawkin's Bazaar (and Tobar Group) were bought by Primary Capital from administration through a management buy-out, although they did already own the company in the first place.

The company continued trading in 2012 and opened several additional stores towards the end of the year (some at previous sites). As of December 2012, the company had 27 stores open around the UK. During 2012, the Tobar Group achieved sales of over £20 million and employed 250 people.

In December 2015, the company was bought in a management buy-out supported by private equity firm Merino. While under the ownership of Merino, Tobar acquired Bluw Limited in 2016, a Scottish toy company, H Grossman (established 1946, Glasgow), in March 2018, and an educational company, Kit for Kids, in March 2019.

=== 2020 administration ===
In 2018, the company made a £978,344 loss on sales of £15.3 million. In August 2019, Merino put the business up for sale. The company entered administration for the second time on 23 January 2020, with Tom Straw and Simon Thomas being appointed as Joint Administrators. As of January 2020, Hawkin's Bazaar had 18 locations, all of which closed on 3 February.

The Hawkin's Bazaar brand was bought out of administration by H Grossman Ltd, a company owned by Tobar/Merino. Today, H Grossman, controlled by Merino Industries Limited and Mark Colley, operate not only under the Hawkin's Bazaar brand, but also Stocking Fillers and Tobar.

On 22 November 2021, Menkind bought Hawkin's Bazaar and Stocking Fillers from H Grossman for an undisclosed sum; Menkind would absorb the two companies, meaning that the Hawkin's Bazaar brand was nonexistent as of 2024.

== Location ==
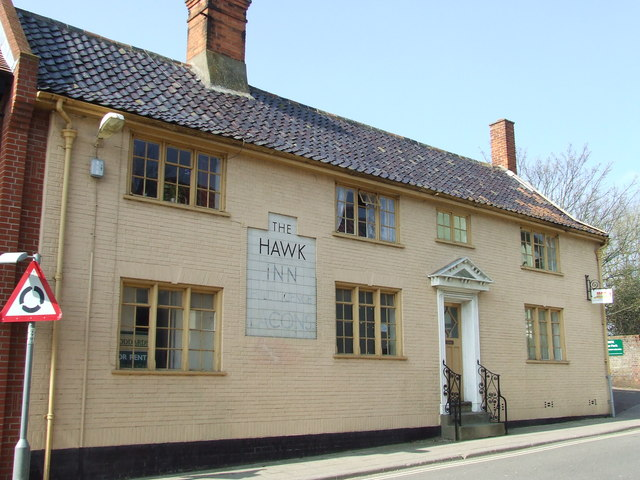
The Hawk Inn pub, Suffolk

The company was founded in Corbridge, Northumberland, before moving to St Margarets and opening stores across the United Kingdom. From 2007 up to the end of 2012, Hawkin's Bazaar operated out of Beccles from The Old Aerodrome in Worlingham, where the warehouse and head office were based. At the start of 2013, the company separated these two entities, with the warehouse moving to Eye, Suffolk, and the head office to Norwich.

In addition to their UK operations, Tobar have a warehouse in France, a presence in Scandinavia, and a showroom in Hong Kong.
