= Geoff Harden =

- Born: 8 July 1943; Kent, England
- Died: 4 September 2006 (aged 63); Belfast, Northern Ireland
- Occupation(s): journalist, radio presenter, recording engineer
- Notable credit(s): The News Letter, Sunflower Folk Club, Belfast CityBeat, U105

Geoff Harden (8 July 1943 – 4 September 2006) was a journalist, broadcaster, recording engineer and folk music promoter. Born in Kent, England, Harden moved to Belfast, Northern Ireland in 1966. He became well known on the music scene in Belfast after setting up the Sunflower Folk Club in Corporation Street, and consequently for his work as a folk music columnist in The News Letter and as a presenter on and contributor to numerous local radio stations.
