= Paddy O'Flaherty =

Irish broadcaster and journalist

- Born: 1943
- Died: 27 September 2016
- Career
- Show: Good Morning Ulster
- Station: BBC Radio Ulster
- Show: Evening Extra
- Station: BBC Radio Ulster

Paddy O'Flaherty (1943 – 27 September 2016) was a broadcaster and journalist for BBC Northern Ireland. He was known for his work on BBC Radio Ulster, including Good Morning Ulster and Evening Extra, as well as his love for country music.

== Career ==
O'Flaherty grew up in the Ballyhackamore area of Belfast, Northern Ireland. In the 1960s and 1970s, O'Flaherty worked as a journalist for The Irish News; he covered topics from Irish civil rights to the country music column. In the 1990s, O'Flaherty worked as BBC Radio Ulster's angling reporter on the Your Place and Mine programme. He also presented the Make Mine Country programme on BBC television and reported on many 'lighter' issues on radio and television. O'Flaherty's last programme on Good Morning Ulster was a discussion of the use of telephone boxes in an age of mobile phones.

== Death and tributes ==
O'Flaherty died on 27 September 2016; his death was announced by Noel Thompson on Good Morning Ulster. Speaking after his death was announced, Peter Johnston, the Controller of BBC Northern Ireland, said that "We were all deeply saddened to hear of the death of Paddy, who for many years was a well-known face and voice across our airwaves and television screens." Northern Ireland First Minister Arlene Foster said that she was "really sorry to hear about Paddy's death. Such a gentle person", whilst deputy First Minister Martin McGuinness said that O'Flaherty was "a wonderful broadcaster, fiddler and like myself, a fly fisherman". Séamus Dooley from the National Union of Journalists said that O'Flaherty was "the embodiment of all that is best in public service broadcasting". He was remembered at the 2016 Phonographic Performance Ireland Radio Awards along with Terry Wogan. His funeral was held at St Gerard's Church in Belfast, and was attended by 300 people. O'Flaherty's wife Brenda died in 2003, and he is survived by his two children.
