= List of people from Northern Ireland =

This list includes notable people who were born in, or lived in Northern Ireland.

== A–G ==
- Gerry Adams – politician
- Max Adrian – actor
- Mark Allen – snooker player
- Gerry Anderson – television presenter
- Willie Anderson – Ireland Rugby Union International
- Colin Bateman – actor, director and writer
- David Bates – physicist
- Andrea Begley – singer
- Philomena Begley – country music singer
- Eric Bell – guitarist for Them and Thin Lizzy
- John Stewart Bell – physicist
- Jocelyn Bell Burnell – astrophysicist
- George Best – footballer
- Rory Best – rugby player
- Colin Blakely – actor
- Danny Blanchflower – footballer
- May Blood – trade unionist and peer
- Robert Bradford – politician
- Conor Bradley – footballer
- Kenneth Branagh – actor and director
- Anna Burns – novelist
- Jake Burns – founder of and singer in the punk band Stiff Little Fingers
- Amanda Burton – actress
- Stephen Boyd – actor
- Calibre – musician, DJ
- Vivian Campbell – rock guitarist for Def Leppard
- Peter Canavan – Gaelic footballer
- Joshua Cargill – drag queen
- Adam Carroll – racing driver
- Ciarán Carson – poet
- Frank Carson – comedian
- George Cassidy – jazz musician
- Andrea Catherwood – journalist and television presenter
- Darren Clarke – golfer
- George Clarke – filmmaker
- Clare Crockett – Roman Catholic religious sister and actress
- Phil Coulter – songwriter, pianist and music producer, arranger and director
- Nadine Coyle – singer for Girls Aloud
- Sean Coyle – radio presenter
- James Craig – loyalist paramilitary criminal
- John Daly – television presenter
- Steven Davis – footballer
- George Dawson – politician
- Martin Dillon – author and journalist
- Brendan Dolan – darts player
- Laura Donnelly – actress
- Richard Dormer – actor
- Jamie Dornan – actor, model, musician
- Roma Downey – actress
- Adrian Dunbar – actor
- Hugo Duncan – singer and broadcaster
- Joey Dunlop – motorcycle racer
- Robert Dunlop – motorcycle racer
- Garth Ennis – comics writer
- St. John Greer Ervine – writer
- Jonny Evans – footballer
- Michelle Fairley – Game of Thrones actress
- Fra Fee – actor
- Harry Ferguson – inventor; developed modern agricultural tractor and first four-wheel drive Formula One car; first person to build and fly his own plane in Ireland
- Dave Finlay – professional wrestler; associated with World Wrestling Entertainment
- Emily Flain – actress
- Brendan Foley – writer, director
- Arlene Foster – former first minister of Northern Ireland
- Carl Frampton – boxer
- Brian Friel – playwright
- Jackie Fullerton – television presenter
- Bronagh Gallagher – actress and singer
- Mike Gibson – rugby player
- Stephen Grimason – journalist
- Daryl Gurney – darts player

== H–M ==
- John Hallam – actor
- Holly Hamilton – journalist and television presenter
- Neil Hannon – musician, The Divine Comedy
- David Healy – footballer
- Seamus Heaney – poet
- Paul Henry – artist
- Alex Higgins – snooker player
- Conleth Hill – Game of Thrones actor
- Ciarán Hinds – actor
- David Holmes – composer, DJ and musician
- Eamonn Holmes – television presenter
- Geraldine Hughes – actress
- John Hume – recipient of Nobel Peace Prize
- David Humphreys – rugby player
- Gloria Hunniford – television presenter
- Eddie Irvine – racing driver
- Saoirse-Monica Jackson – actress
- Oliver Jeffers – artist and author
- Pat Jennings – footballer
- Jimeoin – actor and comedian
- Marie Jones – playwright
- Patrick J. Jones – painter
- Valene Kane – actress
- John Kelly – author and broadcaster
- John Kelly – coal merchant and shipowner
- Samuel Kelly (1818–1877) – coal merchant and shipowner
- Sir Samuel Kelly (1879 –1937) – coal merchant and shipowner
- Tracy Kelly – politician
- Brian Kennedy – musician
- Patrick Kielty – television presenter
- Jack Kyle – rugby player
- Kyle Lafferty – footballer
- Christine Lampard – television presenter
- Joseph Larmor – physicist
- John Lavery – painter
- Michael Legge – actor
- Neil Lennon – footballer
- C. S. Lewis – writer
- Helen Lewis – choreographer and pioneer of modern dance
- Gary Lightbody – singer for Snow Patrol
- John Linehan – entertainer
- Jane Loughrey – journalist for UTV
- John Lynch – actor
- Susan Lynch – actress
- Bernard MacLaverty – writer
- Patrick Magee – actor
- Simone Magill – professional footballer
- Derek Mahon – poet
- Paula Malcomson – actress
- Linda Martin – singer
- Brian Mawhinney (PC) – former British politician and chairman of the Football League in England
- Paddy Mayne – soldier and explorer
- Mary McAleese – president of Ireland
- Stephen McAnena – writer and screenwriter
- Willie John McBride – rugby player, captained Ireland and British Lions
- Christopher McCafferty – club promoter, DJ
- Graeme McDowell – golfer, Lions
- Ian McElhinney – actor
- Leah McFall – singer-songwriter
- Lisa McGee – playwright and screenwriter
- Eimear McGeown – flautist
- Matt McGinn (born 1978) – singer-songwriter
- Damian McGinty – singer and actor
- Alister McGrath – Christian theologian
- Medbh McGuckian – poet
- Martin McGuinness – politician
- Rory McIlroy – golfer
- Gerry McKenna MRIA – biologist
- Robert McKenzie – actor
- David McKittrick – journalist
- Ralph McLean – television presenter
- Paul McLoone – radio producer and lead singer of The Undertones
- James McParland – Pinkerton detective
- Peter McParland – footballer
- Gerard McSorley
- Olivia McVeigh – influencer, actor
- Stephanie Meadow – athlete
- Brian Moore – novelist
- Gary Moore – former blues rock guitarist for Thin Lizzy
- Colin Morgan – actor
- Van Morrison – singer
- William Mulholland – civil engineer
- Hercules Mulligan – Irish-American tailor and spy during the American Revolutionary War, member of the Sons of Liberty
- Colin Murray – radio and television presenter
- Ruby Murray – pop chart star

== N–Z ==
- Kristian Nairn – actor
- Liam Neeson – actor
- Sam Neill – actor
- James Nesbitt – actor
- Alanna Nihell – boxer
- Stephen Nolan – radio and television presenter
- Una O'Connor – actress
- Jamie-Lee O'Donnell – actress
- Martin O'Neill – footballer and football manager
- Michelle O'Neill – politician
- Ian Paisley – preacher and politician
- Rhonda Paisley – author
- Norman Parke – MMA fighter
- Glenn Patterson – novelist
- Mary Peters – athlete
- William Pirrie – co-designed the RMS Titanic
- Graeme Purdy – photographer and author
- Patricia Quinn – actress
- Ronan Rafferty – golfer
- Stephen Rea – actor
- Aimee Richardson – actress
- Brendan Rodgers – football manager
- Zöe Salmon – television presenter
- Feargal Sharkey – lead singer of The Undertones
- Dean Shiels – footballer
- Victor Sloan – photographer and artist
- Hans Sloane – inventor
- Michael Smiley – actor
- Joe Swail – snooker player
- Bronágh Taggart – actress
- Dennis Taylor – snooker player
- William Thomson, 1st Baron Kelvin – mathematical physicist and engineer
- Austin Trevor – actor
- Andrew Trimble – rugby player
- Juliet Turner – singer-songwriter
- VerseChorusVerse – musician and singer/songwriter
- John Watson – Formula One driver
- Tim Wheeler – lead singer, guitarist and songwriter of the band Ash
- Norman Whiteside – footballer
- Jayne Wisener – actress
- Jo Zebedee – author and businesswoman
