= Martin O'Brien (journalist) =

Irish journalist

Martin O'Brien is an Irish journalist, author, media/communications consultant and speech writer. A former Editor of The Irish News , he is the co-author of "In Good Time" - A Memoir by Harold Good with Martin O'Brien, which was published by Red Stripe Press (Dublin) in October 2024. He specializes in religious affairs and was Northern correspondent of The Irish Catholic until he started work on "In Good Time". He covered the election of Pope Francis for BBC Northern Ireland. He left the BBC on 31 March 2013, having been on the staff for 28 years, and has established his own business, Martin O'Brien Media, based in Belfast. As a freelance journalist he contributed to the coverage of the Lying in State of Pope Francis for BBC Newsline (TV), BBC Radio Ulster and UTV Live, in April 2025. Also, for The Irish News he extensively covered the Conclave which elected Pope Leo XIV while also contributing to the coverage on BBC Radio Ulster, UTV Live and Newstalk .

== Personal life ==
O'Brien was born in Enniskillen, County Fermanagh, Northern Ireland.

He is a graduate in Politics and Scholastic Philosophy from Queen's University, Belfast, and served on the university's Senate from 1982 to 2006. He was the recipient of The Irish Association for Cultural, Economic and Social Relations Montgomery Medal in 1993 for his Queens University's Master's dissertation on Prime Minister Margaret Thatcher's Irish policy.

He is married with two daughters and two sons.

== Career ==
O'Brien began his journalistic career as a reporter with the Belfast Telegraph. Before joining the BBC, he was Editor of The Irish News from 1982 to 1984. At his appointment, at the age of 27, he was believed to be the youngest daily newspaper editor in the UK or Ireland.

He is Associate Producer and originator of "Our Man in the Vatican" the 2010 BBC (Northern Ireland) TV observational documentary trilogy depicting a year in the life of Francis Campbell, then United Kingdom Ambassador to the Holy See - and its sequel "Our Man in the Vatican: The Papal Visit" which was broadcast shortly after the Pope's visit to Britain. It captured Ambassador Campbell's role in the planning and organisation of Benedict XVI's State visit to Britain.

O'Brien worked as a producer in network development in Northern Ireland from 2011 until 2013. From 1996 to 2011 he produced Sunday Sequence, BBC Radio Ulster's weekly religious affairs and ethics programme, winning four Andrew Cross Awards in religious affairs broadcasting. In March 2013 O'Brien covered the Conclave and the election of Pope Francis for BBC Radio Ulster and broke the news of the election live on BBC Radio Ulster's Evening Extra programme as the white smoke bellowed from the chimney of the Sistine Chapel, ahead of numerous other news outlets worldwide. In an article for BBC News On-Line he reported that the Irish Government will eventually re-open an Embassy to the Holy See. Previously he produced Good Morning Ulster and Sunday Newsbreak, winning a Radio Academy Sony Award for best radio current affairs programme in the United Kingdom. In May 2013 O'Brien was appointed Northern Correspondent of The Irish Catholic, a Dublin-based weekly newspaper, and conducted the first ever media interview with an elderly Catholic priest who carried a bullet in his brain from a gun attack in 1974. In November 2015 in The Irish Catholic he conducted the first wide-ranging interview with Mary McAleese since she retired as President of Ireland in 2011. Since he retired from the BBC O'Brien has contributed occasional columns and features to The Irish News and The Belfast Telegraph.
