= Malachi O'Doherty =

British journalist, writer and broadcaster (born 1951)

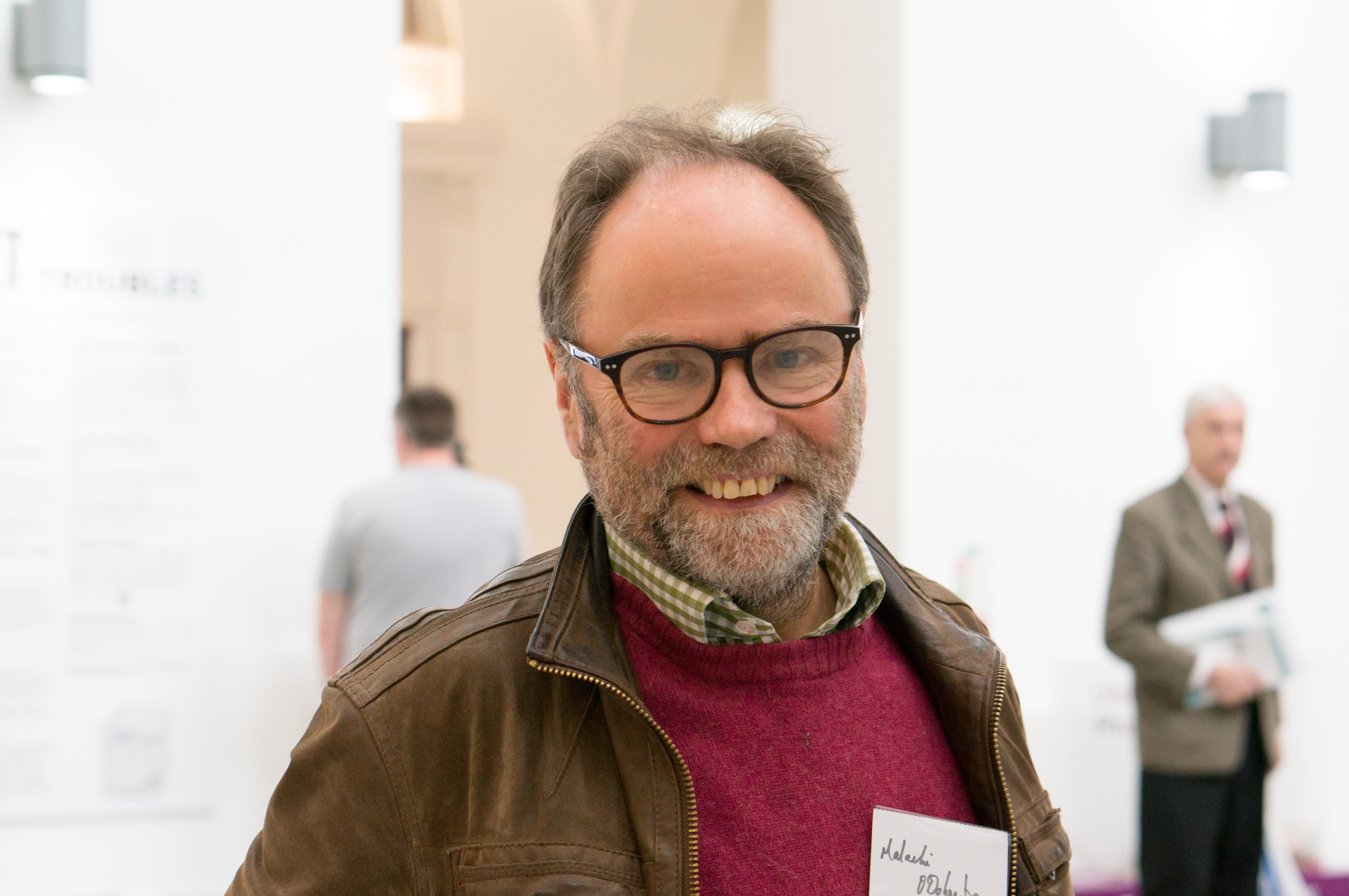
Malachi O'Doherty

Malachi John O'Doherty (born 1951, Muff, County Donegal, Ireland) is a journalist, author and broadcaster in Northern Ireland. He is the producer and presenter of the audio blog Arts Talk.

== Career ==
O'Doherty was one of the longest running commentators/columnists on any Irish radio programme, having been a regular on Radio Ulster's Talkback from its creation in the mid-1980s until a revamp of the programme in 2009. He provided political and social commentary for BBC NI's Hearts and Minds programme, and was often a frequent reporter for BBC Radio Ulster's Sunday Sequence in the programme's heyday.

His political journalism has been published in many Irish and British newspapers and periodicals, including The Irish Times, The Guardian, The Sunday Times, The Observer, The Scotsman and The New Statesman. In the mid-1990s he worked on and presented several television documentaries on Northern Irish culture and politics, for Channel Four, The BBC and UTV, all of them with independent production companies, chiefly Observer Films, DBA and Chistera. He is a former Managing Editor of Fortnight magazine. He writes for the Guardian's Comment is Free blog.

He writes most frequently now in the Belfast Telegraph where his is often commissioned to write about religion and terrorism. He frequently writes through memoir. He has published four memoirs. One, I Was A Teenage Catholic (2003), deals with the development of his thinking on religious issues and the other, The Telling Year (2007) recounts his work as a young inept journalist in Belfast in the worst year for deaths (1972) of the Troubles in Northern Ireland.

He wrote about his father, Barney, in Under His Roof (2009) and more recently a reflection on cycling and ageing in On My Own Two Wheels (2012). He has dabbled in fiction and drama. He wrote comedy sketches for a controversial BBC television cabaret called The Show in the early 1990s and scripted a history of the Dominicans in Ireland for a nationwide schools production in 2007.

O'Doherty has avoided expressions of party-political commitment though he has been more critical of the IRA than of any other party to the conflict, frequently accusing it of having been the prime irritant. But he has supported the Good Friday Agreement, which was endorsed by both the IRA and Loyalist groups and most political parties. He has addressed political groups from across the spectrum, including the Ulster Unionist Party and the SDLP. He has twice been a keynote speaker at the Alliance Party of Northern Ireland's annual conference. He gave a major speech at the Irish Association's annual conference in 2003 examining the future of nationalism.

O'Doherty appears at literary festivals in Northern Ireland and Scotland (Aspects and Wigtown, for example) and has also read at The Blue Met in Montreal (2004) and the Ottawa International Writer's Festival (2008).

On 16 March 2007, O'Doherty delivered a lecture to the French Society for Irish Studies on the life and thinking of Margaret Noble, a County Tyrone-born Methodist who had taken the name Sister Nivedita, when initiated into the Ramakrishna Mission by her Guru, Swami Vivekananda. In the 1970s for four years he was in India, in the ashram of Swami Paramananda Saraswati. He has written about this in I Was A Teenage Catholic.

== Books by Malachi O'Doherty ==
- The Trouble With Guns: Republican Strategy and the Provisional IRA (The Blackstaff Press, 1998), ISBN 9780856406058. Described by the former leading IRA volunteer and informant Sean O'Callaghan as "An honest and decent book . . . It is lucid and accessible, and is the most subtle analysis of the modern-day republican movement that I have read ... one of the most valuable books to emerge from Northern Ireland in recent years."
- I Was a Teenage Catholic (Mercier/Marino, 2003), ISBN 9781860231551. An account of Malachi O'Doherty's upbringing in west Belfast, his experiences of Catholicism and his eventual rejection of the church's beliefs. The book also narrates his travels in India and his encounter with a Hindu swami.
- The Telling Year: Belfast 1972 (Gill and Macmillan, 2007), ISBN 9780717141906. A memoir of living and working as a journalist through the worst year of the Troubles, 1972. This was also the year O'Doherty was approached by an RUC officer in Northern Ireland and invited to become an "informer". He declined.
- Empty Pulpits: Ireland's Retreat From Religion (Gill and Macmillan, 2008), ISBN 9780717142361. An account of the rapid secularisation of Ireland. O'Doherty attracted the wrath of humanist groups for his own attacks on the "new atheists" and his claims that their critiques of religion were flawed by a failure to comprehend religious motivation.
- Under His Roof (Summer Palace Press, 2009), ISBN 9780956099563
- On My Own Two Wheels (Blackstaff Press, 2012), ISBN 9780856408892
- Gerry Adams: An Unauthorised Life (Faber, 2017), ISBN 9780571315963
- Fifty Years On: The Troubles and the Struggle For Change in Northern Ireland (Atlantic, 2019), ISBN 9781786496645
- Terry Brankin Has A Gun (Merrion, 2020), ISBN 9781785373107
- The Year of Chaos: Northern Ireland on the Brink of Civil War, 1971/72 (Atlantic 2021) ISBN 9781838951214

== Biography ==
O'Doherty was born in 1951 in Muff, County Donegal but raised in West Belfast, Northern Ireland. He trained as a journalist at the College of Business Studies in Belfast and as a mature student in 1990, took a master's degree in Irish Studies from Queen's University Belfast.

In June 1995 he married poet and broadcaster Maureen Boyle. He is a former Writer in Residence at Queen's University Belfast. He was awarded a PhD by the School of English at QUB in 2012.
