= William Crawley =

Northern Irish journalist

William Crawley MRIA is a Belfast-born BBC journalist and broadcaster. He is the presenter of Talkback, a daily radio programme on BBC Radio Ulster, and he is a presenter of Sunday on BBC Radio 4. He has also made several television series for BBC Northern Ireland.

== Early life ==
William Hugh Galloway Crawley was born and raised in North Belfast. He was educated at Grove Primary School, Dunlambert Secondary School, Belfast Royal Academy and Queen's University, where he studied Philosophy (B.A., M.Phil.). He read Theology (M.Div.) at Princeton Theological Seminary. In 1999 Crawley was awarded a PhD by Queen's for a thesis on the epistemology of the American philosopher Alvin Plantinga.

Prior to his career in the media, Crawley worked as a university lecturer in Philosophy and Theology. Having been licensed, then subsequently ordained into the ministry of the Presbyterian Church in Ireland in the mid-1990s, he worked as assistant minister in First Presbyterian Church, New York City, and Fisherwick Presbyterian Church, Belfast, before serving as Presbyterian chaplain at the University of Ulster. He later resigned from the ordained ministry and from membership of the church before beginning his career as a journalist. He has described himself as "a lapsed Protestant."

== Television programmes ==
- Blueprint NI, a three-part series examining Ireland's natural history, first broadcast in 2008.
- The late-night television interview show, William Crawley Meets..., a series of 30 minutes in duration with leading thinkers and social reformers from across the world, including the philosopher Peter Singer, the scientist Richard Dawkins, the writer and broadcaster Melvyn Bragg, and the gay bishop Gene Robinson.
- Frozen North (BBC One, 2008), a documentary examining the possible future impact of global warming.
- Festival Nights (BBC Two), television coverage of the 2005, 2006 and 2007 Belfast Festival at Queens.
- Hearts and Minds, a Northern Ireland politics programme.
- What's Wrong With ...? (BBC One), a six-part round-table current affairs discussion programme.
- More Than Meets The Eye (BBC Two, 2008), a series investigating folklore in contemporary Ireland.
- He anchored the BBC's live coverage of the Queen's official visit to Northern Ireland in 2008.
- In 2010, he presented an episode of Spotlight (BBC One NI) concerning the Vatican.
- In 2012, he wrote and presented a 60-minute documentary exploring the history of the Ulster Covenant.
- In 2013, his series An Independent People examined the history of Ireland's Presbyterians.
- His 2013 one-hour documentary It's a Blas followed his year-long effort to learn Irish sufficiently well to present a live radio programme in the language.
- The 2013 programme The Man Who Shrank The World told the story of the engineering feat carried out by the scientist Lord Kelvin in the creation of a transatlantic communications cable was made as part of the Groundbreakers series for BBC Four.
- His 2014 four-part series for BBC Two Northern Ireland, It's a Brave New World -- New Zealand, examined the links between Northern Ireland and New Zealand.
- 2015 Brave New World: USA (4 part series).
- 2016 Brave New World: Australia (4 part series).
- 2017 Brave New World: Canada (4 part series).
- 2018 Brave New World: Bringing It Home (1 episode).
- 2019 Spend It Like Stormont.

== Radio programmes ==
- He presented Sunday Sequence on BBC Radio Ulster from 2002 to 2014.
- Since 2008, he has presented Sunday on BBC Radio 4.
- He has presented the daily radio phone-in show Talkback on BBC Radio Ulster since 2015.
- He has presented Radio 4's Beyond Belief and The Moral Maze.

== Awards and memberships ==
- Fellow of the Royal Society of the Arts (FRSA).
- Fellow of the British-American Project.
- Recipient of Eisenhower Fellowship (2012).
- Honorary Doctor of Letters (D.Lit.), Queen's University Belfast, 2012, for services to broadcasting.
- Andrew Cross Award for Speech Broadcaster of the Year 2006, and other programme content awards.
- Thinker and Explainer of the Year, Slugger O'Toole/Channel 4 Political Awards 2011.
- Aisling Award, 2013, for contribution to Irish language broadcasting.
- Patron, Belfast Film Festival.
- Member of advisory board of Irish Pages: A Journal of Contemporary Writing.
- 2015 Royal Television Society Documentary Award for Brave New World: New Zealand.
- Member of the Royal Irish Academy.
- 2022 IMRO Speech Broadcaster of the Year (Gold Award).
