= Sarah Brett =

Irish radio presenter

Sarah Jane Brett (born 1974) is an Irish radio presenter, who broadcasts on BBC Radio Ulster's breakfast show.

== Early life ==
Brett was born in Northampton. Her parents moved to Portnoo, a village beside Narin in the west of County Donegal, Ireland, when she was four. She attended St. Columba's Comprehensive School in Glenties, County Donegal.

She enrolled on a journalism course in Derry in her mid-20s.

== Career ==
=== Journalism ===
Brett did a work placement at the Sunday Tribune in Dublin. She worked at the Belfast Telegraph for eight years.

=== Radio Foyle ===
Brett joined BBC Radio Foyle in 2004, later occasionally working on Good Morning Ulster and Talk Back at BBC Radio Ulster. She worked with Enda McClafferty on the Breakfast show from 2010 and won the News Broadcaster of the Year award at the 2013 Phonographic Performance Ireland awards.

=== Radio Five Live ===
In September 2014 Brett joined Radio Five Live on the Afternoon Edition Monday-Thursday programme from 1.00 pm to 4.00 pm, beginning with Dan Walker. In May 2019 she replaced Phil Williams as host of the late evening show, 10.30 pm to 1.00 am, Monday to Wednesday.

=== Radio Ulster ===
In February 2020, it was announced that Brett would be one of the new co-presenters of Good Morning Ulster on BBC Radio Ulster with Chris Buckler. By the time the new presenters came on air Covid had arrived and it would be several months before they came together in the one studio.

== Personal life ==
Brett gave birth to a son, Theo in June 2014. She married Terry Coyle in June 2013, an artist, whom she met in Derry, and who is from Creggan, Derry. They live in Eglinton, County Londonderry.

== See also ==
- Stephen Nolan
