= Marcus Hunter-Neill =

Northern Irish broadcaster

Hunter-Neill as Lady Portia DiMonte in 2015

Marcus Hunter-Neill is a Northern Irish broadcaster. He presented packages for Gerry Kelly and for Arts Extra, for which he was awarded bronze in the Newcomer of the Year category at the 2014 Phonographic Performance Ireland awards. He has also performed the drag persona Lady Portia Di'Monte since 1999.

== Life and career ==
Hunter-Neill was born in Bangor but subsequently moved to east Belfast. His father, Billy, was in charge of the gym at HM Prison Maze during The Troubles and died with cancer in December 2025. Hunter-Neill has an older brother, an older sister, and dyslexia. He launched his drag persona in 1999 after Belfast gay bar The Parliament decided to fill a Sunday karaoke slot with a cabaret act; Lady Portia Di'Monte was inspired by Margo Leadbetter, Goldie Hawn, Charlie's Angels, and a primary school teacher. By July 2009, Hunter-Neill had appeared on Deal or No Deal, Late and Live, and Kitchen Criminals; that month, he organised a fashion show to raise money for Look GoodFeel Better. Hunter-Neill underwent a training course at the BBC in Belfast in 2013, following which he began presenting for Arts Extra and then for Gerry Kelly's show. He was awarded bronze in the Newcomer of the Year category at the 2014 Phonographic Performance Ireland awards.

By April 2016, Hunter-Neill had appeared on Channel 4's Come Dine with Me; that month, he began presenting his own radio show as part of BBC Radio Ulster's New Voices section. Lady Portia marched at several protests demanding the legalisation of same-sex marriage during this period. After appearing with his father on the station's Locks, Frocks, and H-Blocks in 2019 and losing his job during lockdown in 2020, he opened a soup kitchen and a consultancy firm and started coaching programmes and campaigning for the NSPCC. Hunter-Neill opened a gender-neutral salon in May 2023 and donated £20,000 worth of clothes to local charity Show Some Love in July 2024, the latter because Lady Portia's outings no longer required large numbers of costume changes.

In August 2025, Lady Portia and fellow drag queen Miss Dora Belle performed at the children's event Drag Queen Storytime at Holywood Arches Library as part of the EastSide Arts Festival; the latter provided sign language. A protest meant that the pair had to be driven home in police cars, with footage appearing on social media and Hunter-Neill appearing on paedophile hunter websites. Subsequent events were cancelled. Comments by Gordon Lyons and TalkTV's The Political Asylum respectively led Equity to mount a UK-wide campaign against "political interference in the arts" and Hunter-Neill to successfully sue TalkTV for damages.
