= Enda McClafferty =

Irish journalist currently BBC Newsline Political Editor

- Born: 19 May 1970; Letterkenny, Donegal, Ireland
- Occupation(s): Journalist, television presenter
- Known for: BBC Newsline
- Title: Political Editor, BBC Newsline

Enda McClafferty (born 19 May 1970) is an Irish journalist who is the Political Editor of BBC Northern Ireland. He was appointed to the role in December 2020.

== Early life ==
McClafferty was born and raised in Letterkenny in County Donegal in the north-west of Ulster. He later attended the University of Ulster. He lives with his wife and children on the outskirts of St. Johnston, a village in The Laggan district in East Donegal.

== Career ==
McClafferty worked for The Belfast Telegraph from 1995 until 2000. He joined BBC Northern Ireland in 2000 as a Breakfast presenter on BBC Radio Foyle in Derry. He later worked on Spotlight and as a political correspondent before being appointed political editor in 2020.
