= Country Afternoon with Hugo Duncan =

The Hugo Duncan Show
- Other names: Hugo Duncan
- Genre: Radio Broadcast
- Running time: 1 hour 30 minutes
- Country of origin: United Kingdom
- Language: Mid-Ulster English
- Home station: BBC Radio Ulster
- Hosted by: Hugo Duncan
- Produced by: Terri Simpson
- Recording studio: Broadcasting House, Belfast
- Opening theme: Rocky Top
- Ending theme: Yakety Sax
- Website: www.bbc.co.uk/northernireland/radioulster/hugo_duncan/

The Hugo Duncan Show is a country music radio programme, broadcast on BBC Radio Ulster and on BBC Radio Foyle Mondays to Fridays, 1.30pm-3pm. The show is broadcast live from the BBC Radio Foyle studios in Derry City. The show features interviews with country singers and performers, and Hugo regularly takes the show on the road with his Outside Broadcasts around Northern Ireland to meet the listeners.
