= Kerry McLean =

Kerry McLean, born in Ballymoney, is a broadcaster with BBC Radio Ulster. She was educated at Dalriada School, Ballymoney, La Sainte Union, Southampton, University College, London, where she studied French, Education and English Literature, and Psychology at Ulster University.

She joined the BBC in 1993 and over the next six years worked in the following: news and current affairs in Belfast on Good Morning Ulster; in Glasgow on Good Morning Scotland; in London on the Today programme on BBC Radio 4; and later for the Ukrainian and then Education sections of the BBC World Service. Her broadcasting career includes early stints as a traffic and travel reporter, presenting the English/French bilingual output for West Africa for the BBC World Service and, Weekend Extra for BBC Radio Ulster. From 2014 until 2019, Kerry had an afternoon slot, 15:00 - 17:00, Monday - Thursday. From 2019 until 2023 she presented on Sunday afternoons, and since February 2023 hosts the weekend morning shows on BBC Radio Ulster and BBC Radio Foyle replacing the late Kim Lenaghan who died last year. Kerry has also worked as a newspaper columnist for the Belfast Telegraph and hosts the Parentline podcast.

Kerry lives in Ballymoney with her husband Ralph and has three children, Tara, Dan and Eve.
