= Stephen Nolan =

Northern Irish radio and television presenter

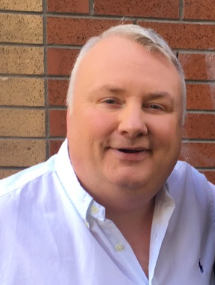
- Nolan in 2018
- Born: Stephen Raymond Nolan; 20 August 1973 (age 53); Belfast, Northern Ireland
- Education: Queen's University Belfast
- Occupations: Radio and television presenter
- Years active: 2002–present
- Employer: BBC

Stephen Raymond Nolan (born 20 August 1973) is a Northern Irish radio and television presenter for BBC Northern Ireland and BBC Radio 5 Live. Nolan is the highest earning BBC broadcaster in Northern Ireland. In the 2023–2024 financial year, he earned a salary in the range of £405,000–£409,999 for his work on BBC Radio Ulster (which is almost always broadcast on BBC Radio Foyle as well), Nolan Live on BBC One (Northern Ireland) and The Stephen Nolan Show on Radio 5 Live.

In an online article in the Manchester Journal, Nolan is described as "a name synonymous with Northern Irish broadcasting, has become a polarising figure. His high-profile role as a radio and television presenter for BBC Northern Ireland has garnered him both staunch supporters and ardent critics".

== Early life ==
Born in the Shankill Road area of Belfast, Nolan was educated at Springhill Primary School, the Royal Belfast Academical Institution and The Queen's University of Belfast, where he studied French and Business Studies, graduating with a BA in 1995.

== Career ==
=== Radio ===
In 2002, Nolan joined Belfast CityBeat, where he won a Sony Radio Academy Award. The following year, he was hired by BBC Northern Ireland, where he has worked since 2003, presenting The Nolan Show on BBC Radio Ulster. The show is also broadcast on BBC Radio Foyle.

Since 16 July 2005, Nolan has presented his own weekend phone-in show for BBC Radio 5 Live, airing from 10pm to 1am every Friday and Sunday, and from 9pm to 12am every Saturday. The show includes updates on the latest news from BBC correspondents, discussion about the news with contributions from listeners and guests, and discussion of the newspaper headlines of the following day. Until 2017, he also co-hosted Question Time Extra Time, a simulcast of BBC One's Question Time, followed by a continuation of debates on 5 Live.

In 2006, Nolan was involved in a mock boxing match with Gerry Anderson in aid of the BBC's Children in Need appeal.

On 13 October 2021, he launched a podcast, Nolan Investigates.

BBC Northern Ireland claims The Nolan Show remains the "most listened to" radio broadcast in Northern Ireland following reports it has been surpassed by Cool FM. Cool FM's owners, Bauer Media NI, claim audience figures "tell a different story". Bauer content director Stuart Robinson said that while Radio Ulster had dominated ratings, "there has been a change in fortunes in the past 12 months".

An article in The Irish Times claimed that The Nolan Show dominated Northern Ireland's airwaves but asked if it was "hard hitting or just hardline", noting that critics say the amount of airtime given by Nolan to some unionists stirs division. In the article, Professor Peter Shirlow, director of the University of Liverpool's Institute of Irish Studies, said "There's clearly good journalism in that he's exposing issues. . . but it seems to me you're finding an aggression in society through that programme, you're digging into an aggression which evidence tells us doesn't exist in the way that it did."

==== Nationalist boycott ====
Following coverage of the Bobby Storey funeral during the COVID pandemic, Sinn Féin, an Irish republican political party, began boycotting the show. The SDLP also began to boycott the radio programme after the abrupt, on-air removal of the SDLP's Stormont leader, Matthew O'Toole, in March 2023 over comments about the spokesman for the Loyalist Communities Council, an umbrella group which issues statements on behalf of some loyalist paramilitary groups.

The Irish Times reported that in April 2023 a "heated" meeting took place between the SDLP and BBC Northern Ireland director Adam Smyth, with party leaders raising concerns about the balance of the programme's contributors and editorial accountability. Smyth sent the party an email in late June 2023, confirming that an assessment of "content" on the programme over a "typical one month period" had been performed to address the issues mentioned in the meeting. The BBC's Executive Complaints Unit concluded that Nolan was justified in stopping O'Toole's participation during the 3 March broadcast. The SDLP described the BBC's handling of the situation as "extremely poor" and refused to meet Smyth and other BBC executives again until it has a copy of the review into The Nolan Show.

The SDLP ended their boycott at the beginning of the campaign for the 2024 general election.

==== DUP boycott ====
The Democratic Unionist Party (DUP) boycotted the programme for several years due to alleged "bias" in its coverage of the party's role in the Renewable Heat Incentive scandal.

=== Television ===
Nolan has presented several television programmes. Nolan Live on BBC Northern Ireland is a weekly television debate and phone-in show. Fair Play, also on BBC Northern Ireland, was a weekly consumer watchdog programme. Mission Employable was a series focusing on helping a group of unemployed people to find their dream career. Nolan has also presented the BBC's Children in Need Northern Ireland broadcast. Since 2008, he has presented Panic Attack, airing on Friday nights in Northern Ireland. The show was repeated nationwide in a daytime slot starting in February 2010. In 2008, he stood in for Matthew Wright on Five's The Wright Stuff. In 2011, Nolan presented a documentary focusing on the Shankill Butchers. Since 2008, Nolan has hosted a weekly TV version of The Nolan Show on BBC Northern Ireland every Wednesday.

In 2013, a new series, Story of a Lifetime, hosted by Nolan, began with episode one focusing on the life of his Radio Ulster colleague Hugo Duncan.

In 2023, Nolan gained access to Maghaberry Prison for his six-part documentary for BBC television, screened nationwide, Jailed: Inside Maghaberry Prison.

In 2023–24, Nolan earned between £405,000 and £409,999 as a BBC presenter.

In 2026, Nolan presented the police series Peelers: The PSNI for Real for BBC One Northern Ireland. The series took two years to make. Nolan accompanied first-response officers in attending crime scenes, drug-den raids and the execution of arrest warrants, to capture first-hand, the daily, on-the-ground work of the Police Service of Northern Ireland. During the series' filming, Nolan and the officers explain the personal toll that their work, places on them, including having sleepless nights. A first series, of six episodes, started airing on 27 April. A second six-part series was released on 11 November 2026.

=== Ulster–Scots programming and funding ===
The TV show Stephen Nolan: Ulster-Scots, My Family and Me was made by Third Street Studios, commissioned by the BBC Northern Ireland and made with the support of Northern Ireland Screen's Ulster-Scots Broadcast Fund. The programme's development was supported by the Ulster-Scots Broadcast Fund (USBF), but no programme-level figure was provided. According to Northern Ireland Screen's USBF awards list for 2014–15, Stephen Nolan Broadcasting Ltd was awarded £14,996.

Nolan and his associated companies have been the beneficiaries of additional funding from this body. Third Street Studios Ltd received £83,625 to support the production of The DNA of Ulster-Scots with Nolan. Additionally, Third Street Studios Ltd received £37,500 to support the production of 'The Music and Dance of Ulster-Scots: Piping and Drumming'.

=== Editorial style criticism ===
Nolan's editorial approach has attracted criticism regarding the balance and tone of his programming. Questions have been raised about whether Nolan's show's approach is genuinely "hard-hitting" journalism or merely "hardline" in its editorial stance. His television and radio shows have been accused of having a pro-Unionist bias and have been referred for impartiality/bias by Ofcom to the BBC. Nolan has defended himself against such claims.

=== Misconduct allegations ===
In 2023, Nolan was accused by multiple employees of "bullying and harassment", fostering a "siege mentality", and sending unsolicited sexually explicit images. He admitted to, and apologised for, the sending of a sexually explicit image.

Allegations emerged regarding Nolan's workplace conduct. Reports indicated that Nolan was alleged to have exhibited bullying behaviour towards colleagues, with at least one former member of his team making a formal complaint of bullying against him.

=== Sexually explicit images incident ===
In 2023, it was reported that Nolan had sent sexually explicit images to BBC colleagues in 2016. The images were of Stephen Bear, a reality television personality who later appeared on Nolan's programme Nolan Live. Bear was subsequently convicted and sentenced to 21 months in prison for revenge porn and voyeurism in 2023.

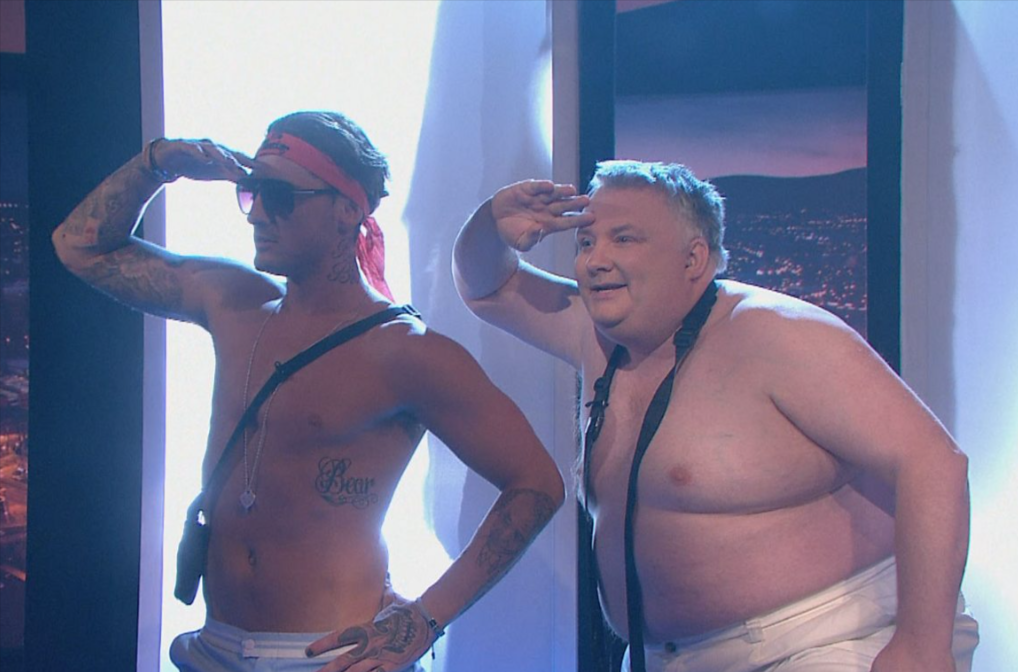
Stephen Bear appearing with Stephen Nolan on the BBC's Nolan Live in November 2016

According to reports, Nolan circulated two explicit photographs to several BBC colleagues. Recipients responded in different ways, with one colleague reportedly being "shocked and offended" by the images. The BBC conducted an investigation which led to disciplinary action being taken under the corporation's policies, with the BBC stating that "appropriate action" was taken. Nolan subsequently apologised for his actions.

=== Legal cases ===
Nolan received an unreserved apology over a "deluge" of social media posts accusing him of being "involved in sectarianism and of inciting hatred and violence in Belfast". In 2025, an article in The Irish News claimed that a seriously ill woman was being sued by Nolan, which she described as "unnecessary and unwanted". Her solicitor said the legal process had been ongoing for several years and was "taking a toll" on his client.

In 2021, Nolan received a five-figure settlement and private apology from a Twitter user who had posted false allegations and personal abuse. The agreement followed a six-figure payout the previous day from another individual accused of running an online campaign against him. Neither party was identified under the settlement terms. Nolan's lawyer, Paul Tweed, confirmed Nolan accepted the apology and compensation.

=== Café incident ===
In March 2025, the owner of a Belfast café called Breakfast Baps asked Nolan to leave his premises after a confrontation over an obesity post. Speaking on The Stephen Nolan Show after the incident, Nolan said that the owner of the café told one of his team that the presenter is "about two stone off a mobility scooter himself." After standing by his opinion shared in the social media post, the owner came around to the other side of the counter and removed Nolan from the café.

=== Recruitment process allegations ===
In October 2023, Nolan faced allegations of corrupting the BBC recruitment process. Democratic Unionist Party (DUP) MP Gregory Campbell accused Nolan of giving questions in advance to an applicant for what was described as a "highly sought after job" at the BBC, effectively coaching the candidate prior to their interview.

=== Expenses controversy ===
In July 2017, the BBC refused to reveal whether it pays travel expenses for Nolan in addition to his salary, which was £450,000 at the time.

=== Business interests ===
In 2023, Nolan transferred all shares in his production company to a firm solely controlled by bookmaker Paul McLean. Up until December 2022, Nolan had been sole shareholder of Third Street Studios, which was set up in 2014. The Irish News revealed details of a transaction transferring all shares in the firm to a company headed by McLean, the managing director of McLean's Bookmakers. In 2023, The Irish News published an article that claimed "Stephen Nolan had outstanding loans from company totalling close to £900,000". It added that "directors' loans like that can trigger corporation tax liabilities if not repaid within a certain period after year end".

In 2022, shares of Third Street Studios Ltd were transferred to a new entity (Tssoet Limited), which is a trustee of an Employee Ownership Trust.

=== East Belfast housing protest ===
In September 2024, Nolan was present during a protest in East Belfast concerning the accommodation of convicted sex offenders. A crowd followed a Police Service of Northern Ireland (PSNI) operation to relocate a convicted offender, and media reported that Nolan faced "angry scenes" from local residents expressing concern about housing arrangements.

==== Awards ====
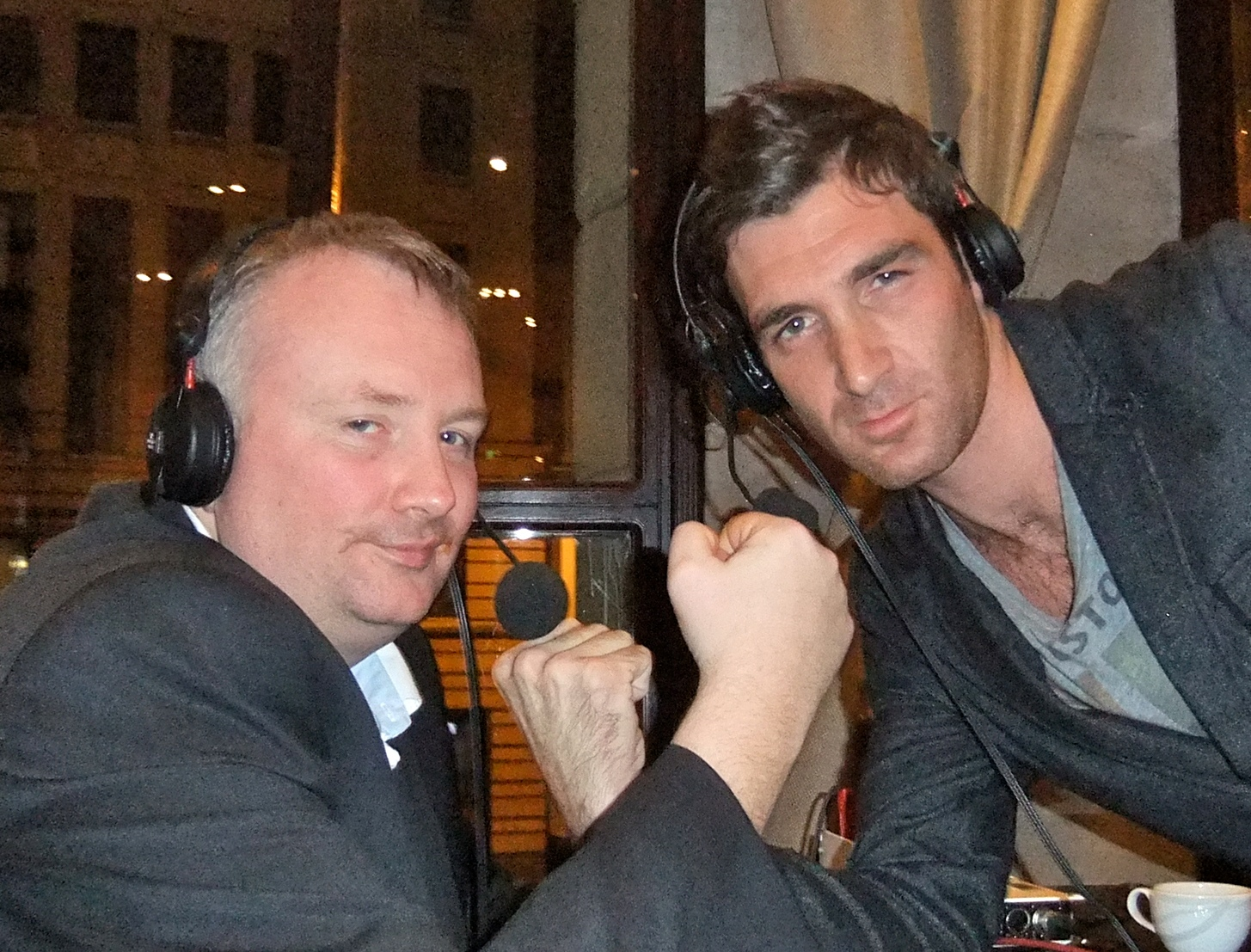
Nolan (left) posing with Paul Martin

In total, Nolan has won twelve Sony Radio Academy Awards. Of these, seven are Gold, giving him the record for the most Golds in the history of the awards. Five of these were awarded during his time with Belfast CityBeat radio, including: UK Speech Broadcaster of the Year 2003 and for his show, The Nolan Show, The Speech Programme Award of the Year 2006. He also won the Royal Television Society's Regional Presenter of the Year Award in 2005 and 2006, as well as being nominated for the National Presenter Award in 2008.

== Personal life ==
Nolan often discusses starting work, aged 12, in a video store while at school. Religion is a regular feature on his radio shows. In 2015, he stated he was an atheist and as a result he issued an apology for breaching BBC guidelines.

In February 2021, Nolan criticised online trolls on Twitter and said: "[i]t's clear I have a weight problem." On his BBC Radio5 show on 30 August 2026, Nolan himself stated that he had lost 9st in weight, down from 23st to 14st, helped in part by weight-loss injection medication.

Nolan lives on Mahee Island in Strangford Lough in County Down.

In an interview with Belfast Telegraph journalist Sam McBride, he told the newspaper that "I've £3m, but not having a family is failure".
