= The Nolan Show =

BBC Radio programme

- Genre: News, current events, and factual
- Country of origin: United Kingdom
- Language: English
- Home station: BBC Radio Ulster and BBC Radio Foyle
- Hosted by: Stephen Nolan
- Produced by: Nolan Team
- Recording studio: Broadcasting House, Belfast and MediaCityUK, Salford

The Nolan Show, hosted by Stephen Nolan, airs on weekdays on BBC Radio Ulster and BBC Radio Foyle from 9:00 am to 10:30 am.

Nolan has also moved onto a network platform, hosting Question Time Extra Time every Thursday night and a three-hour phone-in programme on BBC Radio 5 Live every Friday to Sunday night. He has been voted UK Speech Broadcaster of the Year, and has gained similar success as a television presenter, being voted the Royal Television Society's Presenter of the Year in 2005 and 2006.

== Production ==
The Tuesday to Friday editions of The Nolan Show are broadcast from studios at the BBC Northern Ireland headquarters in Broadcasting House, Belfast. The Monday edition of The Nolan Show is broadcast from MediaCityUK in Salford because of Nolan's BBC Radio 5 Live commitments.
