= Hearts and Minds (1996 TV programme) =

Hearts and Minds is a British political and current affairs television programme presented by Noel Thompson that was broadcast on BBC Northern Ireland. The programme was normally broadcast on Thursday nights at 19:30 on BBC Two and 23:35 on BBC One, and on Sunday afternoons on BBC Parliament. The programme featured the main Northern Irish politicians discussing the biggest event in local politics of that week. The show was broadcast from 1996 to 2012.

== Format ==
An occasional section in the middle of Hearts and Minds called "If You Ask Me..." featured a journalist or commentator giving their opinion on certain events that happened in the week illustrated by the cartoons of Ian Knox. Among those to have participated were Malachi O'Doherty Fionnuala O'Connor, Liam Clarke, Alex Kane, Newton Emerson, Lindsay Allen and Fionola Meredith. At the end of the show there was a comedy sketch featuring Tim McGarry, best known for playing Da in Give My Head Peace, as a Belfast black taxi driver picking up Noel Thompson from the BBC's Broadcasting House in Belfast. In this sketch, McGarry provided a comedic monologue discussing the weekly events.

== Axing and final show ==
Hearts and Minds was axed by BBC Northern Ireland at the end of June 2012 after years of speculation it would end.

The final episode aired on 21 June 2012 with Noel Thompson chairing the show as usual and also played the original titles at the start. The show featured a look back at the past 16 years and featured a panel with all political parties except Sinn Féin as they pulled out at the last minute. The last show featured Malachi O'Doherty in the "If You Ask Me..." section looking back at the show and events at the time with the usual cartoon drawings of all political figures. The final episode showed all big moments such as interviews with leaders and the first time the UUP and Sinn Féin appeared in a studio together and all the bust ups between Noel Thompson and various political figures. The show ended as always with Tim McGarry's taxi journey and ended with Noel saying thanks for watching and goodbye before a final caption saying "That's All Folks!"

It was replaced by a new politics show in September 2012 The View presented by Mark Carruthers as BBC NI wanted all their politics programmes controlled by the same team; therefore the Stormont Today and Sunday Politics teams had a new programme on BBC NI on Thursday nights.
