= The Saturday Magazine =

The Saturday Magazine may refer to either:

- The Saturday Magazine (radio show) a radio show on BBC radio Ulster
- The Saturday Magazine (magazine) a 19th-century British weekly magazine
