= David Dunseith =

Irish journalist (1934–2011)

- Born: 2 October 1934
- Died: 29 June 2011 (aged 76)
- Occupation: Journalist

David Dunseith (2 October 1934 – 29 June 2011) was a Northern Irish journalist and broadcaster with BBC Northern Ireland. He presented BBC Radio Ulster's 'Talkback' & 'Seven Days' programmes. His career spanned the troubles covering the turbulent and tragic events of recent years from the Falls Curfew in 1970 to the Omagh atrocity in 1998. He reported on all the Northern Ireland political initiatives from Sunningdale to the Good Friday Agreement.

== Career ==
He grew up in Derry. Before pursuing a career in the media, he was a police officer, but moved to journalism in the 1970s. He worked for Ulster Television (U.T.V.), presenting many programmes, including UTV Reports and Counterpoint. During UTV's 50th birthday celebrations in November 2009, he co-presented an edition of UTV Live.

David Dunseith is perhaps best known for presenting BBC Radio Ulster's Talkback from 1989 to 2009 – he followed the late Barry Cowan as presenter – but his association with the programme went back even further than that. When it first went on the air in 1986, he was a weekly contributor with an ability to read from a script written on various pieces of scrap paper. He became its main presenter in 1989, going on to establish a huge reputation for straight-talking, no-nonsense, often merciless grilling of interviewees. In 2006 Talkback won a silver Sony Radio Academy Award in the news and current affairs programme category. He presented the 20th anniversary edition of Talkback on Friday 7 September 2006.

In August 2009, he ended over two decades of work on Talkback when Radio Ulster reshuffled presenters on its news and current affairs programmes. On 11 May 2011, Dunseith announced his retirement from Radio Ulster while presenting his final Seven Days.

== Death ==
On 30 June 2011 it was announced that Dunseith had died following a lengthy illness and the age of 76. His funeral was held at Star of the Sea Roman Catholic Church in Strangford before his remains were removed to Roselawn Crematorium.

== Personal life ==
Dunseith married fellow journalist Roisin Walsh and the couple had three sons together. Walsh died in July 2010 from motor neurone disease.
