= Peelers: The PSNI for Real =

BBC police documentary television series

- Title card
- Directed by: Austen Irwin
- Presented by: Stephen Nolan
- Opening theme: "Until the Lights Dim" by Peter J McCauley
- Ending theme: "Guns Under The Floorboards" by Ciaran Lavery and Joshua Burnside
- Composer: Ciaran Lavery
- Country of origin: United Kingdom
- Original language: English
- No. of series: 2
- No. of episodes: 12

Production
- Executive producers: Andrew Coleman; Lesley-Anne McKeown
- Producer: Austen Irwin
- Production location: Northern Ireland
- Editor: Steven Diamond
- Running time: 29 minutes
- Production company: Third Street Studios

Original release
- Network: BBC One Northern Ireland
- Release: 27 April 2026 – present

Peelers: The PSNI for Real is a BBC fly-on-the-wall documentary television series about front-line officers in the Police Service of Northern Ireland. Written and narrated by Stephen Nolan and directed and produced by Austen Irwin, it is filmed in Belfast, Lurgan and Portadown. The series took two years to make. Nolan accompanied first-response officers in attending crime scenes, drug-den raids and the execution of arrest warrants, to capture first-hand, the daily, on-the-ground work of the Police Service of Northern Ireland. During the series' filming, Nolan and the officers explain the personal toll that their work places on them, including having sleepless nights.

== Music ==
The programme opens with "Until the Lights Dim" by Peter J McCauley (from his album Amnesty) and closes with "Guns Under The Floorboards" by Ciaran Lavery and Joshua Burnside. Lavery also wrote the other original music that is played during the programme.

== Broadcast ==
The programme began broadcasting on BBC One Northern Ireland on 27 April 2026 and BBC Two on 20 May 2026. A second series was released on 11 November 2026.

== Reception ==
In a review for the Belfast Telegraph, Billy Weir described both series of the programme as "compulsive viewing". However, Stephanie Chase, writing in the Irish News, criticised it as exploiting Northern Ireland's "serious drug and mental health crisis".

== Awards ==
In November 2026, Peelers: The PSNI for Real won the documentary series category in the Royal Television Society NI Awards.
