= Sean Rafferty =

Northern Irish broadcaster

Sean Rafferty MBE
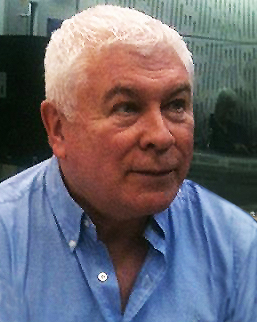
- Sean Rafferty
- Born: 1947 (age 77–78); Belfast, Northern Ireland
- Occupation(s): Radio and television presenter
- Employer: BBC Radio 3
- Known for: Good Morning Ulster; Evening Extra; In Tune

Sean Rafferty MBE (born 1947, Belfast) is a Northern Irish broadcaster, known for his work on BBC Radio 3.

== Early life ==
Rafferty was born in Belfast, Northern Ireland and spent his childhood in Newcastle, County Down, as an adopted child. He went on to study Law at Queen's University, Belfast.

== Career ==
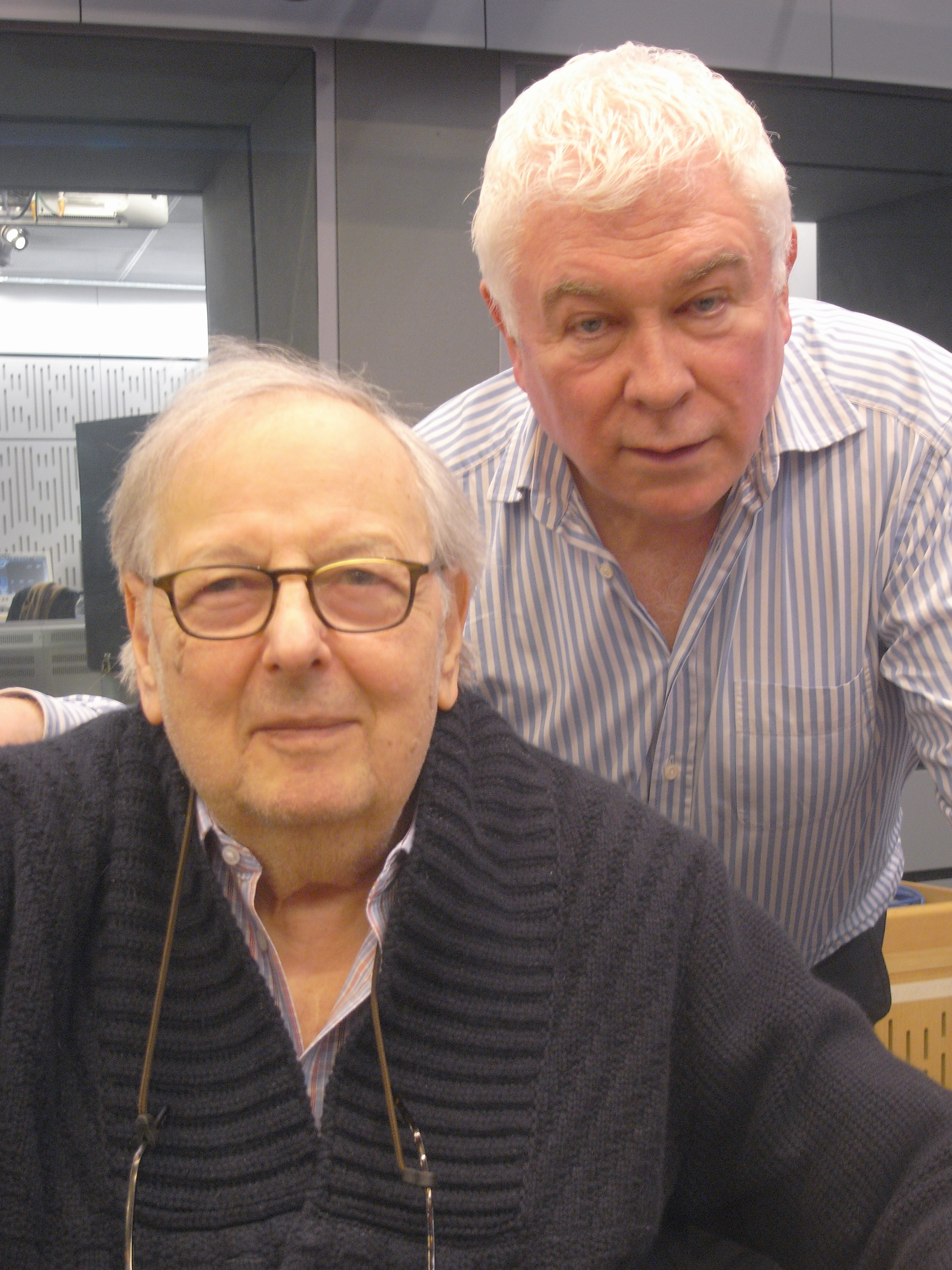
Sean Rafferty with André Previn (left) in the In Tune studio in 2012

Rafferty's original career was as an accountant. In 1969, he met the head of BBC Northern Ireland at a conference. This meeting led to Rafferty joining the BBC as a researcher. Whilst working on Gloria Hunniford's Sunday afternoon programme, Rafferty made his television debut when he was asked to stand in for a news reporter presenting a piece to camera about Christmas presents for men.

In the 1970s and 1980s, Rafferty became a regular presenter on the BBC Northern Ireland television news programmes, Scene Around Six and Inside Ulster. In 1990, he launched his own radio show, Rafferty, the first chat show on BBC Radio Ulster. Among his guests were recently released Beirut hostages Brian Keenan and John McCarthy. Rafferty also conducted an interview with the then-Prime Minister Margaret Thatcher. From 1994, he joined the morning radio news programme, Good Morning Ulster, and the arts programme 29 Bedford Street, and the following year, he launched the drivetime news and current affairs programme on Radio Ulster, Evening Extra. Rafferty also fronted a makeover show, Room for Improvement.

Rafferty was known for his knowledge of classical music, and after years of working mainly in news and current affairs, Rafferty decided to cross over into arts broadcasting. In 1997, he moved to London to present the drivetime music magazine programme on BBC Radio 3, In Tune. The programmes features a mix of live and recorded classical and jazz music, interviews with musicians, and arts news, and Rafferty served as its principal presenter for 27 years.

In June 2024, at the behest of the recently appointed Controller of Radio 3, Sam Jackson, BBC announced a series of planned presenter changes at Radio 3, including the scheduled retirement of Rafferty from In Tune in April 2025. Rafferty departed earlier than had been announced, presenting his final show on 6 December 2024. Rafferty stated that he felt "shell-shocked" about Jackson's decision to remove him from In Tune, and that he had turned down the offer of an alternative Sunday presenting slot, choosing instead to leave the station entirely.

== Honours and awards ==
In 2004, Rafferty was named Radio Broadcaster of the Year at the Broadcasting Press Guild Awards.

Rafferty was appointed Member of the Order of the British Empire (MBE) in the 2017 Birthday Honours for services to broadcasting.
