= Carragher (surname) =

Carragher is a surname. Notable people with the surname include:

- Anna Carragher (born 1948), Irish broadcasting executive and television producer
- Gavin Carragher (born 1933), Australian sprinter
- James Carragher (born 2002), English footballer
- Jamie Carragher (born 1978), English footballer
- Matt Carragher (1976–2016), English footballer
