= Ralph McLean (broadcaster) =

Ralph McLean is a Northern Irish TV presenter, radio DJ, arts commentator, radio producer and newspaper columnist.

== Television ==
McLean presents entertainment TV shows such as The Blackstaff Sessions, First Stop, 11th Hour and Belfast Festival At Queens. He has presented The World Pipe Band Championships for BBC Northern Ireland for several years and worked on numerous shows and specials such as Would You Pass The 11+ and The Big Bumper Science Quiz and also presented several productions for BBC Four. He has interviewed celebrities such as Dustin Hoffman, Tom Cruise, Harrison Ford, Tommy Lee Jones, Mick Jagger, Paul Weller, Dolly Parton and Angelina Jolie.

== Radio ==
McLean presents The Ralph McLean Show from Tuesday to Thursday between 8:00 and 10pm, playing music from classic rock to soul to country and blues

He has presented his own two-hour roots show on Friday nights for many years on BBC Radio Ulster, interviewing many of the biggest names in country music such as Emmylou Harris and Nanci Griffith. He has also produced and presented many shows like Classic Irish Albums and produced numerous acclaimed documentary series such as The Sinéad O'Connor Story, The Tammy Wynette Story and The Loretta Lynn Story for BBC Radio 2.

In 2007 McLean won Specialist Music Broadcaster Of The Year in the PPI Awards.

== Newspaper work ==
McLean writes a popular weekly country music column for The Sunday Life and a cult movies page for The Irish News every Friday.

== Selected appearances ==
=== Television ===
- The Blackstaff Sessions - BBC Two Northern Ireland (three series of the live music TV show)
- Festival Nights - BBC Two Northern Ireland (four series of three times weekly panel review show for Belfast Festival)
- Four Series Of First Stop - BBC One Northern Ireland (Weekly Prime Time Entertainment show co -presented with Christine Bleakley)
- Opening Night Of Belfast Festival At Queens 2004 - BBC Four
- Chieftains In Concert - BBC Four
- Three Series of 11th Hour - BBC Choice (three times weekly entertainment show)
- Burns And Beyond - BBC One Northern Ireland (Burns Night Ulster Scots Special)
- Burns Night Concert - BBC One Northern Ireland 2006
- World Pipe Bands Championships/All Ireland Finals - BBC Two Northern Ireland
- Children in Need 2001–Present - BBC One

=== Radio ===
- The Ralph McLean Show 2006–Present BBC Radio Ulster
- McLeans Country 1999–present BBC Radio Ulster
- Classic Irish Albums 2006 BBC Radio Ulster
- The Afternoon Show BBC Radio Ulster 2006
- The Vinyl Countdown BBC Radio Ulster 2003
