= Seamus McKee =

Seamus McKee is a presenter of "Evening Extra" on BBC Radio Ulster. Previously he was a news presenter for BBC Northern Ireland, mainly working in radio.

A former French and English teacher and sports presenter he has worked for the BBC fulltime since the early 1980s. On 13 September 2022 he provided television commentary for a service at St Anne's Cathedral, Belfast attended by King Charles III on his first visit to Northern Ireland as king. The British Prime Minister Liz Truss and Taoiseach Micheál Martin also attended the service.

== History ==
In 1984, during The Troubles, there was controversy when he was named at an Ulster Unionist Party conference as one of an unrepresentatively large number of Roman Catholics working for the BBC.

== Awards ==
He was named as News Broadcaster of the Year in the Phonographic Performance Ireland (PPI) Radio Awards in 2014 and 2016.
