= Dunseith =

Dunseith may refer to:

- Dunseith, North Dakota
- East Dunseith, North Dakota
- David Dunseith (1934–2011), British journalist
