= Kim Lenaghan =

British broadcaster (died 2022)

Kim Lenaghan

Kim Lenaghan (24 December 1960 – 11 September 2022) was a Northern Irish freelance radio and television broadcaster, writer and critic who was based in Belfast and worked mainly in the fields of the visual and cinematic arts, music and cuisine culture. She was best known as the presenter of BBC Radio Ulster's weekend mornings. and the Sunday lunchtime radio food programme The Foodie as well as the holiday seasonal programmes Festive Feast and Kim's Twinkly Christmas. She previously presented BBC Radio Ulster's This New Day, Arts Extra and the BBC Northern Ireland TV programmes, Country Times and Good Dog, Bad Dog.

Lenaghan's published works included A Little History of Golf and Irish Superstitions and Lores (Angus & Robertson).

Lenaghan graduated from the Queen's University of Belfast with a Bachelor of Arts (Hons.) in English Literature and from Ulster University with a Master of Arts in marketing.

Lenaghan married Andrew Jones in 2017 in London. She lived in East Belfast.

She died on 11 September 2022, at the age of 61, from complications resulting from a fall.
