= Donna Traynor =

Irish television journalist

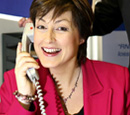
- Born: Donna Traynor; October 1964 (age 61); Lisburn, County Antrim
- Occupations: Broadcaster, journalist
- Known for: BBC Newsline; Raidió Teilifís Éireann (RTÉ)
- Spouse: Ronan Kelly (m. 1992)

Donna Traynor (born October 1964) is a journalist and broadcaster in Northern Ireland. She is best known as the former main anchor of BBC Newsline.

== Early life and education ==
Traynor was born in Lisburn to Kathleen and Gerry Traynor; her family moved to Dublin when she was a child. She has three sisters. Educated at Loreto Convent, Bray, she studied journalism at NIHE, now Dublin City University, and in Preston, Lancashire.

== Broadcasting career ==
Traynor has been nominated twice by the Royal Television Society awards for the Presenter of the Year category. She began her career in broadcasting at RTÉ in Dublin.

Traynor joined the BBC in 1989. She presented news bulletins on BBC Radio Ulster, and was on air when news broke of the Provisional IRA ceasefire in August 1994. Around this time, Traynor began reading television news bulletins, and was later promoted to the position of main anchor on BBC Newsline.

In addition to her news work, Traynor also presented Country Times, various educational programmes and coverage of the Balmoral Show for BBC Northern Ireland, along with local coverage of Children in Need.

On 15 November 2021, it was announced that Traynor had resigned from BBC Northern Ireland with immediate effect after 33 years at the corporation. Claiming discrimination on grounds of age, sex and disability, she brought the case before the employment tribunal against BBC Northern Ireland and its then news director (later director), Adam Smyth. The suit was settled without admission of liability in June 2023.

== Personal life ==
Traynor is deaf in one ear. She married Ronan Kelly, a training consultant and fellow broadcaster, in October 1992 in Dublin. The couple live in south Belfast. Traynor and Kelly are former company directors of a dissolved media company. In April 2022, Traynor and her husband announced the sudden death of Traynor's mother.
