= Paddy Raff Show =

- Genre: Sketch comedy
- Written by: Paddy Raff
- Directed by: Jason Butler
- Starring: Paddy Raff
- Country of origin: Northern Ireland
- Original language: English
- No. of series: 1 (1 in production)
- No. of episodes: 5 (5 in production)

Production
- Executive producers: Justin Binding; Eddie Doyle; Chris Jones
- Producer: Jason Butler
- Running time: 30 minutes

Original release
- Network: BBC One Northern Ireland
- Release: 21 December 2020

The Paddy Raff Show is a sketch comedy television program produced by Nice One Productions for BBC Northern Ireland. It was created and written by Belfast-based comedian Paddy Raff (Patrick Rafferty). As it was filmed during the restrictions of the COVID-19 pandemic, the programme has a very small cast. Raff himself plays a variety of characters in some of the sketches; and in some others he plays a fictionalised version of himself, often accompanied by his real life children. Its first episode was a Christmas special broadcast in December 2020, followed by a four-episode series the following February. A second special and series has been produced, intended for broadcast in winter of 2021/2022

== Recurring sketches ==
- BT9 Nigel A very posh, snobbish man from "Bravo-Tango-Nine" (a well-to-do Belfast postcode). Nigel talks to the camera as he goes through his day-to-day life, annoying most of the people he comes across. He flaunts his wealth and status at every opportunity, and looks down at anyone from other areas, or neighbours who do not share his social-climbing attitude, epitomised by his catchphrase "act your postcode!"
- Mass During the COVID-19 lockdowns, a priest named "Father Pat" livestreams church services on Facebook. He has updated many aspects of the service, including playing electronic or techno versions of hymns. The live comments are visible, including the disapproving thoughts of "Eileen".
- Granny Raff A gobby, foul-mouthed, pass remarkable, elderly woman from West Belfast sits on her couch talking about the minutiae of her day-to-day activities. She frequently gossips about her neighbours and family, in stark contrast to her catchphrase "sure, you know me; I say nothin'." While Granny Raff seems to be giving an interview, it is often revealed at the end of the sketches that she is in fact talking to an unsuspecting caller, such as a TV license inspector or a Jehovah's Witness.
- VR Frustrated that lockdown prevents him from going outdoors and socialising, Paddy uses a virtual reality device to simulate experiences such as a holiday. Paddy seems very impressed by the simulation, even though it replicates some of the more unpleasant aspects of the experiences.
- Profiles of the Past In the early 23rd century, historian Prof. Derek Gilligan presents a documentary in which he researches the remnants of the internet (most of which has been erased by a solar storm). Gilligan helps people find out about their ancestors by showing them their social media posts, which are often irreverent or embarrassing.
- Bel-FM 103.5 Morgan K, an annoying DJ presents his slot, usually getting the titles of the songs wrong and spending more time talking than playing music. The footage of him in his studio is intercut with Paddy Raff (out of character) listening and complaining.
