= The Saturday Magazine (radio show) =

The Saturday Magazine was a radio programme broadcast on BBC Radio Ulster, Northern Ireland on Saturdays from 10:05 am to noon. The programme was presented by John Toal, and covered subjects such as hobbies, health, family life and food.

During the programme, listeners could hear big name interviews, personal stories, newspaper reviews, and recipes cooked live in studio by The Saturday Magazine’s resident chef Paula McIntyre.

John says: "The Saturday Magazine is very broad in the subjects that it covers. Sometimes you’ll laugh out loud and sometimes you’ll shed a tear, but we always aim to be thought-provoking and entertaining...and Paula and Stuart are integral parts of the show’s success. The number of times people have stopped me to say they ‘bought that album and liked it’ or ‘tried to make that dish but burnt it’ encourages me that we’re on to something."

John Toal Presented the last Saturday Magazine show on Saturday 25 October 2014. The Blame Game now takes the 10:00am Slot followed by Simply "John Toal".
