= Jim Dougal =

- Born: James Dougal; 19 March 1945; Belfast, Northern Ireland
- Died: 15 October 2010 (aged 65); Belfast, Northern Ireland
- Occupations: Broadcaster, writer, journalist
- Years active: 1969–2010

James Dougal (19 March 1945 – 15 October 2010) was a Northern Irish journalist, writer and broadcaster who had worked, from 1969 until shortly before his death for RTÉ, UTV and the BBC.

He was said to have maintained a long friendship with Ian Paisley.

He created a production company, Dougal Media, for which he made profiles of Paisley and Margaret Thatcher. His greatest passion, though, was his family. He is survived by his wife, Deirdre, daughters Tara, Emma and Tina, a stepdaughter, Nicola, and a son, James.

== Journalism ==
An alumnus of St Mary's Christian Brothers' Grammar School, Belfast and a former civil servant, Dougal's career as a journalist began at BBC Northern Ireland as a general reporter. He also worked at Ulster Television before taking up the post as Northern editor at RTÉ from 1974 to 1991.

Dougal returned to BBC Northern Ireland in 1991 as the station's political editor, replacing Denis Murray upon his promotion to Ireland Correspondent for the corporation's network news bulletins. Dougal's reports were featured on Inside Ulster and Newsline. In February 1996, Dougal was appointed as the new co-presenter of BBC Northern Ireland's relaunched evening news programme Newsline 6.30.

Dougal stood down from presenting the programme after just two months to concentrate on reporting.

== European Commission ==
Dougal left the BBC in 1997 to take up a job for the European Union, initially based in Belfast. He later became the head of the European Commission for the United Kingdom until 2004.

== Return to journalism ==
In 2006 Dougal returned to broadcasting by presenting and producing The Eternal Optimist, a documentary about the former Church of Ireland Primate of All Ireland Robin Eames. He formed a part of UTV's presenting team for the station's coverage of that year's Northern Ireland Assembly election in March 2007.

Dougal, who ran his own broadcast company Dougal Media, also presented and produced a UTV documentary entitled Paisley, from Protest to Power charting the life of Northern Ireland's First Minister Ian Paisley – the programme aired on the day Paisley took up office in Northern Ireland alongside Deputy First Minister Martin McGuinness.

He continued to work as a broadcaster, writer and media affairs and public affairs consultant until his death on 15 October 2010 at the age of 65 from cancer.

== Honours ==
Dougal was awarded an honorary doctorate from Queen's University, Belfast for services to the community in Northern Ireland.
