= Sean Coyle =

BBC Radio presenter (born 1946)

- Born: John Coyle; 1946 (age 78–79); Derry, Northern Ireland
- Occupation: Radio broadcaster

John "Sean" Coyle (born 1946) is a Northern Irish radio broadcaster from Derry, Northern Ireland who, until 2019, worked for BBC Northern Ireland on BBC Radio Ulster and BBC Radio Foyle, hosting The Sean Coyle Show from 10:30am - Noon, Monday to Friday from the Foyle Studios on the Northland Road,

== Broadcasting in Northern Ireland ==
Coyle grew up in Derry and had a variety of jobs before he fell into broadcasting. One story Coyle himself regularly told is that he owned a shop in Waterford, but while listening to Gerry Anderson on the radio he fell in love with what he was doing and sent Anderson a tape of his impressions. Henry Cooper and Barry McGuigan were two of his best subjects. "When I heard his impersonation of Barry I knew he was doing something that nobody else had done. Sean had correctly observed that Barry always sounds like he is talking to you from a great distance away. I knew that Sean had something different, that he was really good, very clever." -Anderson on Coyle.

== Radio career ==
Sean was Gerry's producer for many years, the "straight" sidekick to the more creative, comic and unpredictable Anderson, working for the corporation for a total of 35 years. They were a recognised and formidable double team who often took the programme outside the studio and occasionally outside Ireland, most notably in 1991 on a tour of Los Angeles, San Francisco and Las Vegas.

Sean took over The Gerry Anderson Show following Gerry's passing in 2014 having filled in for Gerry from 2013.

In August 2019 it was announced that Coyle was to leave BBC Radio Ulster and BBC Radio Foyle as part of wider schedule changes, however after backlash from listeners, the BBC relented and moved Sean from this mid-morning slot to a new afternoon programme which will only air on BBC Radio Foyle each weekday from 3.00pm - 5.00pm until late Spring 2020. His new afternoon show started on BBC Radio Foyle on Monday 7 October 2019.
