= Evening Extra =

- Country of origin: Northern Ireland
- Website: www.bbc.co.uk/programmes/b007cpv5

Evening Extra is the BBC's drive time news and current affairs radio programme in Northern Ireland. It is broadcast live on BBC Radio Ulster, BBC Radio Foyle and BBC Sounds on weekday evenings, from 5pm to 6pm. It is presented by Richard Morgan. The programme provides a daily round-up of the day's main news and sports stories, as well as the latest breaking news.

== Programme origin ==
Evening Extra was launched in 1996 as part of a wider station re-launch by Anna Carragher in light of the paramilitary ceasefires of 1994 and a need to alter the tone and range of the news output. The first presenter was Sean Rafferty.

As part of wider schedule changes in September 2019 Evening Extra was extended to fill two hours in the schedule, having previously been broadcast from 5pm - 6.30pm for many years. Evening Extra is the most listened to drive time news programme in Northern Ireland.

== Presenters ==
From April 2020 to May 2025 the programme was presented by Declan Harvey and Tara Mills. Both also present BBC NI television news programme, BBC Newsline on alternate evenings. In February 2020 it was announced Richard Morgan would also join the team as a full time third presenter.

Further schedule changes in Spring 2025 saw Evening Extra focused to a one hour news programme, 5pm-6pm. Tara Mills and Declan Harvey departed the line-up to focus on a twice-weekly news podcast, called ‘The State of Us’ which launched in May 2025. Richard Morgan remained as the sole lead anchor of Evening Extra.

=== Relief Presenters ===
A selection of presenters, reporters and correspondents front the programme in the absence of Richard Morgan. It most regularly includes Claire Graham, Eve Rosato and Richard O'Rielly.

=== Previous Presenters ===
Seamus McKee retired as a regular presenter of Evening Extra in January 2020, having fronted the programme since 2009. Presenter Conor Bradford left BBC Radio Ulster in early 2022, after an extended term of absence.

== Year ‘21 spin-off ==
In December 2020 it was announced Mills and Harvey would create and front a spin-off podcast, produced by BBC News NI, to mark one hundred years since the creation of Northern Ireland. 'Year '21' was billed as: "the fascinating story of how Northern Ireland was created, told week-by-week." The podcast was made available on BBC Sounds and other external platforms. 50 episodes, of 15 minutes each, were commissioned for between January and December 2021.

Year ‘21 was made a finalist for Best Serialised Podcast in the 2021 New York Festivals Radio Awards. It was also a finalist for Best Sound Design. It was nominated for Best Podcast at the 2021 IMRO Awards. The following year, 2022, it was awarded Silver for Best History Podcast, and shortlisted for Best Educational Podcast.

== Studio ==
Evening Extra is broadcast live from Studio 4 at BBC Broadcasting House, Belfast. Studio 4 is the only full service studio to sit within the main newsroom.
