= On Your Behalf =

Radio programme in Northern Ireland

On Your Behalf is a consumer affairs radio programme broadcast on BBC Radio Ulster on Saturday mornings and repeated midweek in the evening. The programme, first broadcast in September 1995, offers advice to listeners' consumer problems and reports on the latest developments in consumer law and how these may affect their rights. It was formerly presented by Linda McAuley.

On Your Behalf won the Trading Standards Institute's 'Best Consumer Television or Radio Programme' award in 2006. The presenter Linda McAuley also won the 'Northern Ireland Consumer Journalist' category.
