= Blas (Radio Ulster) =

Irish-language radio programme

Blas, is an Irish-language magazine programme, broadcast Monday to Thursday on BBC Radio Ulster, from 7.30 p.m to 8.00 p.m. With 'Blas Ceol' broadcasting on Thursday nights from 8.00 p.m. to 9.00 p.m.

Blas focuses on news and stories which are of interest to an Irish-speaking audience, including sport, arts and literature, politics and current affairs. The programme focuses mainly on news and stories from Northern Ireland, but also covers stories from Republic of Ireland, and the Gaelic-speaking areas of Scotland.

The programme is produced by BBC Gaeilge, and features a roster of presenters throughout the year. Main presenters are Fearghal Mag Uiginn, Máire Bhreathnach, Dáithí Ó Muirí and Caoimhe 'Chats' Ní Chathail. Caoimhe 'Ceol' Ní Chathail presents an hour-long programme 'Blas Ceoil' on Thursday evenings, which covers traditional and folk music, while Brian Mullen, one of the original presenters of Blas, presents Caschlár on Sunday evenings.

A weekly podcast is available to download on Fridays.
