= Peter Johnston (BBC) =

British broadcasting executive

Controller of BBC Northern Ireland
- Incumbent
- Assumed office 2006
- Preceded by: Anna Carragher

Personal details
- Born: 1965 (age 60–61) Ballymena, Northern Ireland
- Education: Ballymena Academy
- Alma mater: Imperial College London

Peter Johnston (born Ballymena, 1965) is a former Controller of BBC Northern Ireland. He was educated at Ballymena Academy and Imperial College London, where he graduated in Chemical Engineering and Management. Prior to joining the BBC, he worked for Shell International in London and Price Waterhouse Coopers in Belfast. He joined BBC Northern Ireland in 1994 as a research executive, later becoming head of marketing and development, then Head of New Media for BBC Nations and Regions, before taking up post as Head of Broadcasting in 2003. He was appointed Controller on 27 October 2006, the youngest person ever to hold that position.

In 2009 he was appointed as the chairman of Skillset's Northern Ireland national board.
