= Sunday Life (newspaper) =

Northern Irish newspaper

- Type: Sunday newspaper
- Format: Tabloid
- Owner(s): Mediahuis Ireland, a subsidiary of Mediahuis
- Editor: Eoin Brannigan
- Founded: 23 October 1988
- Headquarters: Belfast, Northern Ireland
- Sister newspapers: The Belfast Telegraph

The Sunday Life is a tabloid newspaper in Northern Ireland and has been published since 23 October 1988. It is the sister paper of The Belfast Telegraph and is owned by Mediahuis Ireland, a subsidiary of Mediahuis.

== History ==
The Sunday Life was born on 20 April 1988, at that time the Belfast Telegraph was owned by the Thomson International Organisation. After getting the go-ahead at an executive meeting, Belfast Telegraph managing director Bob Crane called together his senior executives and they organised a private conference to plan the launch of the Sunday Life. He booked the small Drumnagreagh Hotel near Ballygally on the Antrim coast and there the blueprint for the Sunday Life was created. Crane made two immediate appointments – Ed Curran and Margaret Clarke. Curran, deputy editor of the Belfast Telegraph who joined the company in 1966, would be the editor. He would go on to become Belfast Telegraph editor. Clarke, a key figure in management, was asked to assume additional responsibilities as general manager of Sunday Life. With so many executives away from the Belfast Telegraph HQ rumours were rife in media circles that something was being planned so Crane decided that a statement had to be issued to clarify the position. This statement became known as "the Drumnagreagh Declaration". This statement was issued on 29 April 1988. Ed Curran and Roy Lilley, the Belfast Telegraph's editor, were asked to draft a press release. During a coffee break as the new paper was being planned at the Drumnagreagh Hotel in Co Antrim, they sat at an old typewriter in the hotel's office to hammer out what became known as "the Drumnagreagh Declaration":

Belfast Telegraph Newspaper Limited is planning a new Sunday newspaper this year. Mr R.C. Crane, managing director of Belfast Telegraph Newspapers Limited, said today: "This exciting new development will mean increased opportunities for employment in the newspaper business in Northern Ireland. The necessary journalists and advertising sales staff will be recruited shortly. 'The new paper will have the benefit of the most up-to-date technology. It will make full use of colour and will provide readers and advertisers with a reliable and comprehensive service. The editor of the paper, which is still at the planning stage, will be Mr Edmund Curran, currently deputy editor of the Belfast Telegraph. Mr Curran was educated at Dungannon Royal School and is a graduate of Queen's University. He joined this company in 1966 and after gaining experience as a reporter, feature writer and leader writer, took up his present position in 1974. 'Mr Curran is widely known as a commentator on Northern Ireland affairs on radio and television, and as a contributor to publications of international standing in Britain and the United States. He stated today: "We intend to produce a Sunday newspaper which Northern Ireland readers and advertisers will enjoy and respect. We will have a top-class team, and although independent of the Telegraph, will reflect the high standards set by it." 'Mrs Margaret Clarke, the Belfast Telegraph classified advertising manager, will assume additional responsibilities as general manager of the new paper, developing it as a major advertising medium.".

== Awards ==
At the CIPR NI Media Awards in June 2016 the paper was awarded the Newspaper of the Year title, an award it had held in Northern Ireland for the previous two years. In 2015 and 2017 Sunday Life was also awarded the UK Daily/Sunday Newspaper of the Year title (above 25,000) at the Society of Editors' Regional Press Awards in London.

== Circulation ==
Average print circulation was approximately 90,000 copies per issue in 2004 and had dropped to approximately 30,000 by late 2018.

Year (period)	Average circulation per issue
2004	94,000
2005	84,082
2008 (January to June)	66,763
2008 (July to December)	63,528
2010	54,435
2015 (July to December)	40,057
2016 (January to June)	38,355
2016 (July to December)	36,467
2017 (January to June)	36,046
2017 (July to December)	32,892
2018 (January to June)	32,045
2018 (July to December)	30,435
2019 (January to June)	29,857
2019 (July to December)	28,636

== Columnists ==
- Ivan Little
- Dan Gordon
- Suzanne Breen
- Ralph McLean
- John McGurk
- Carl Frampton
- Kyle Lafferty
- Liam Beckett
- Kelly Allen
