= Linda McAuley =

Linda McAuley, MBE, was formerly a presenter for the BBC Radio Ulster consumer advice programme On Your Behalf.

McAuley first worked for Downtown Radio in 1976 as a copytaker, then newsreader and presenter. She joined BBC Radio Ulster in 1978 as presenter of the evening drive time programme Change Gear. Since September 1995 she has hosted the Saturday morning consumer programme On Your Behalf.

The Trading Standards Institute named On Your Behalf "Best Consumer Television or Radio Programme", and McAuley was awarded "National Consumer Journalist of the Year for Northern Ireland" in 2006.

McAuley married Paul Wilson in 1998. She has three sons, Neil, Michael and James, together with her first husband, whom she divorced in 1992. She lives in Bangor, County Down.
