= Wendy Austin =

Northern Irish journalist

Wendy Elizabeth Austin Hewitt
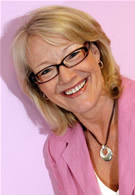
- Born: Wendy Elizabeth Austin; November 19, 1951 (age 74); Belfast, Northern Ireland
- Occupation: Television presenter

Wendy Elizabeth Austin Hewitt MBE (born November 19, 1951) is a former BBC journalist and broadcaster in BBC Northern Ireland, and former presenter of BBC Radio Ulster's current affairs programme Talkback.

== Biography ==
Austin began her career in journalism at The Belfast Telegraph, leaving in 1976 to join the fledgling Downtown Radio, and later that year moving to the BBC where she was a television reporter before moving into radio presentation.

From 1981 she was involved in the breakfast time Good Morning Ulster reporting and presenting, before moving to the newly created Breakfast Time on BBC TV. Other radio shows followed - Morning Extra and Wendy After Lunch, before a move to BBCR4 in London, presenting PM Woman's Hour and The Exchange. She returned to present GMU in the early 1990s. On one occasion on Good Morning Ulster while interviewing former Ulster Unionist Party deputy leader John Taylor she objected to what she perceived as his patronising style and stated "I am not your dear girl." In 2009 she began to present the lunchtime Talk Back on Radio Ulster, then in 2015 launched the station's Inside Business programme.

In 2005 Wendy Austin was awarded an Honorary Degree of Doctor of Letters (DLitt), University of Ulster, "for her contribution to broadcasting". She was named the Northern Ireland Radio Broadcaster of the year in the CIPR Awards 2006. Austin was Chairperson of the Arts and Business NI Advisory Committee and a UK Trustee of the charity. Wendy was awarded an MBE in the 2012 Queen's Birthday Honours list.

It was announced in 2019 that Austin would retire from the corporation in 2020 after nearly 44 years with the BBC. However she later returned to the BBC in September 2021 to present BBC One Northern Ireland's new monthly programme Crime NI, in partnership with Crimestoppers UK, alongside Dearbhail McDonald. The series, which also offered regular crime prevention and traffic safety advice, ended in April 2022.

== Personal life ==
Austin married Translink chairman Frank Hewitt in 2003 in Banbridge, County Down. She was previously married to Peter Hutchinson, with whom she had three children, Niall, Kerry and Clare. She lives in Dromore, County Down.
