= Harold Good =

Irish Methodist (born 1937)

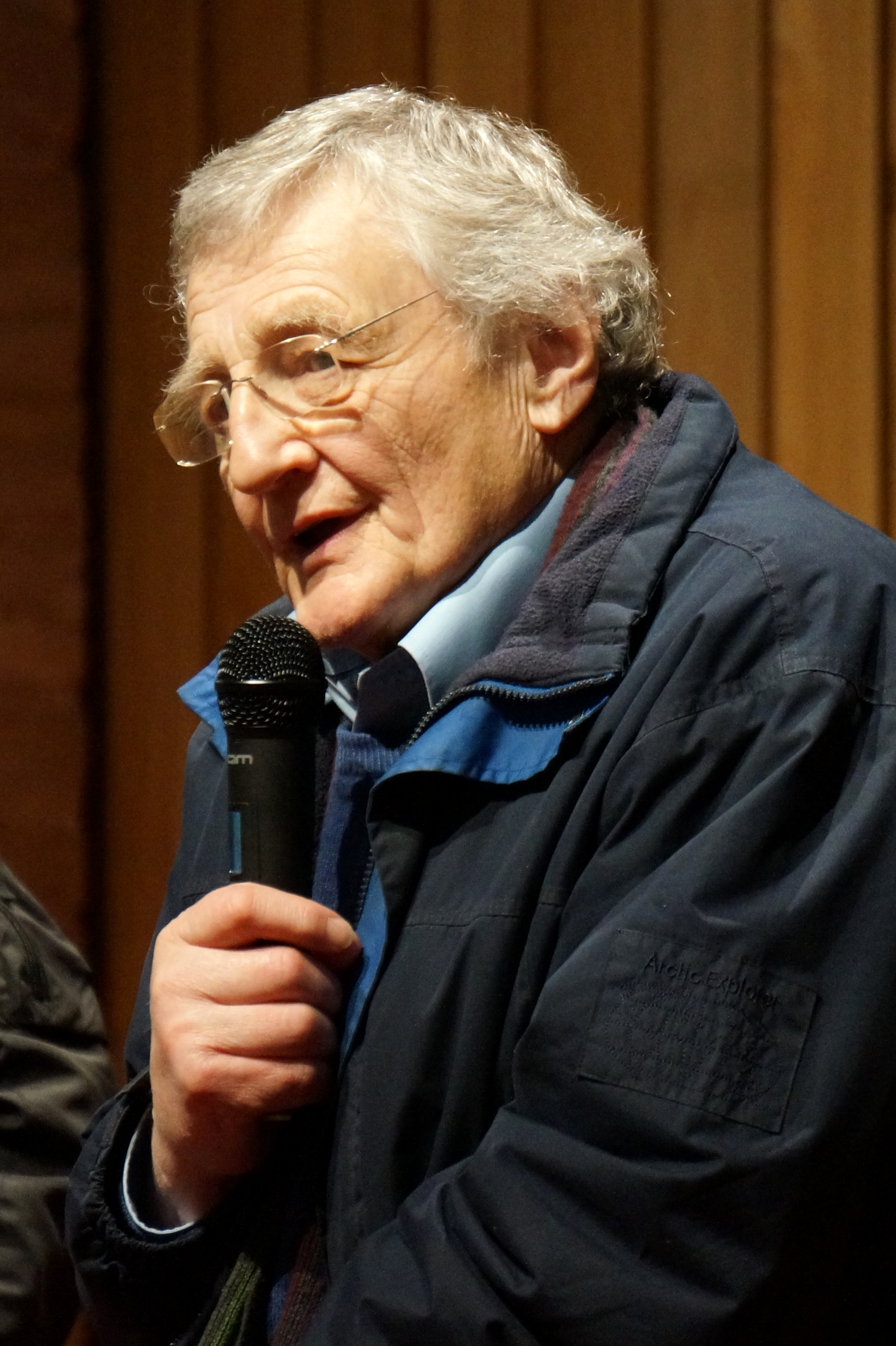
Good speaking in Belfast in 2014

George Harold Good OBE (born 1937 in Derry) is an Irish Methodist who, in 2005, played a vital role in the Northern Ireland peace process. In October 2024 the Dublin publisher Red Stripe Press published Good's memoir, "In Good Time", A Memoir with Martin O'Brien.

He trained as a hospital chaplain at Methodist Hospital of Indianapolis in 1967–68. He served as a minister in Shankhill, Belfast and also at the City's Crumlin Road prison. From 1973 to 1979 he was director of the Corrymeela Community Centre for Reconciliation. In 2001, he was appointed president of the Methodist Church in Ireland. In 2005, he was one of two independent witnesses, the other being Alec Reid, who oversaw the decommissioning of arms, a vital part of the peace process. In 2007, he was awarded the World Methodist Peace Award.

Good was appointed Member of the Order of the British Empire (MBE) in the 1970 New Year Honours "for relief work to the community"; in the 1985 Birthday Honours he was promoted to Officer of the Order of the British Empire (OBE).
