= BBC Newsline =

Television series

- Title card used since November 2022
- Theme music composer: David Lowe
- Country of origin: United Kingdom
- Original language: English

Production
- Producers: BBC News; BBC Northern Ireland
- Camera setup: Multi-camera
- Running time: 30 minutes (main 6:30 pm programme); 10 minutes (1:30 pm and 10:30 pm programmes); Various (on weekends and Breakfast)

Original release
- Network: BBC One Northern Ireland
- Release: 12 February 1996 – present

BBC Newsline is the BBC's national television news programme for Northern Ireland, broadcast on BBC One Northern Ireland from BBC Northern Ireland's headquarters at Broadcasting House in Ormeau Avenue, Belfast.

As well as being available via all multi-channel outlets in Northern Ireland (including via Sky channel 101), the programme can be accessed by the rest of the United Kingdom (along with all other regional BBC news programmes) on the BBC iPlayer, or alternatively on Sky channel 973. Viewers from the Republic of Ireland with a Sky subscription can also watch on Sky channel 141. As the BBC UK regional TV on satellite service is broadcast unencrypted, it is possible to receive BBC Newsline anywhere in Europe using an appropriate receiver.

== Programme history ==
BBC Newsline is the most recent incarnation of BBC Northern Ireland's television news service, which began on Monday 30 September 1957 as part of the corporation's rollout of regional television services. The first five-minute bulletins, Today in Northern Ireland, were presented by Maurice Shillington and broadcast from a tiny radio studio within Broadcasting House in Belfast.

Up until the launch of Today in Northern Ireland, a networked topical magazine programme, Ulster Mirror, had been broadcast every fortnight since Friday 26 November 1954. The new daily bulletins were later expanded to ten minutes and supplemented by a magazine programme called Studio Eight, first broadcast on Friday 20 February 1959 with Robert Coulter as its presenter. Today in Northern Ireland was replaced on 17 September 1962 by a 20-minute programme initially known as Six O'Clock. The new longer magazine programmes changed title to Six Five and Six Ten until Scene Around Six was introduced in January 1968.

The programme was known as Inside Ulster between 1984 - 1996

Newsline 6:30 was introduced on 12 February 1996 when the main evening programme returned to a 6.30 pm timeslot. Although Noel Thompson and Lynda Bryans were the original choice of presenters, Thompson was later dropped causing Bryans to resign and move to UTV. The programme's first presenters were political editor Jim Dougal and reporter Yvette Shapiro. Dougal was replaced as anchor by Conor Bradford after two months. BBC Newsline also introduced teletext subtitles for deaf viewers upon its launch. It became ‘’BBC Newsline’’ in 1999.

BBC Newsline is now presented by a single main anchor

In November 2021, Traynor had resigned from BBC Northern Ireland after 33 years, amid legal proceedings.

The following month, it was announced that Tara Mills and Declan Harvey will alternate as main anchors of BBC Newsline and the BBC Radio Ulster drivetime news programme, Evening Extra. Harvey joined the programme in early 2022.

== Notable presenters and reporters ==
BBC Newsline is anchored on an alternating basis by Tara Mills and Declan Harvey.

Catherine Morrison is a frequent relief presenter, along with Lyndsey Telford and Mark Carruthers.

Breakfast and evening bulletins are presented by Kerry Thompson, Linzi Lima, Eve Rosato and Rick Farragher.

== Previous notable presenters and reporters ==
- Jackie Fullerton
- Jim Dougal
- Noel Thompson
- Donna Traynor
