= Talkback (radio programme) =

BBC radio show from Northern Ireland

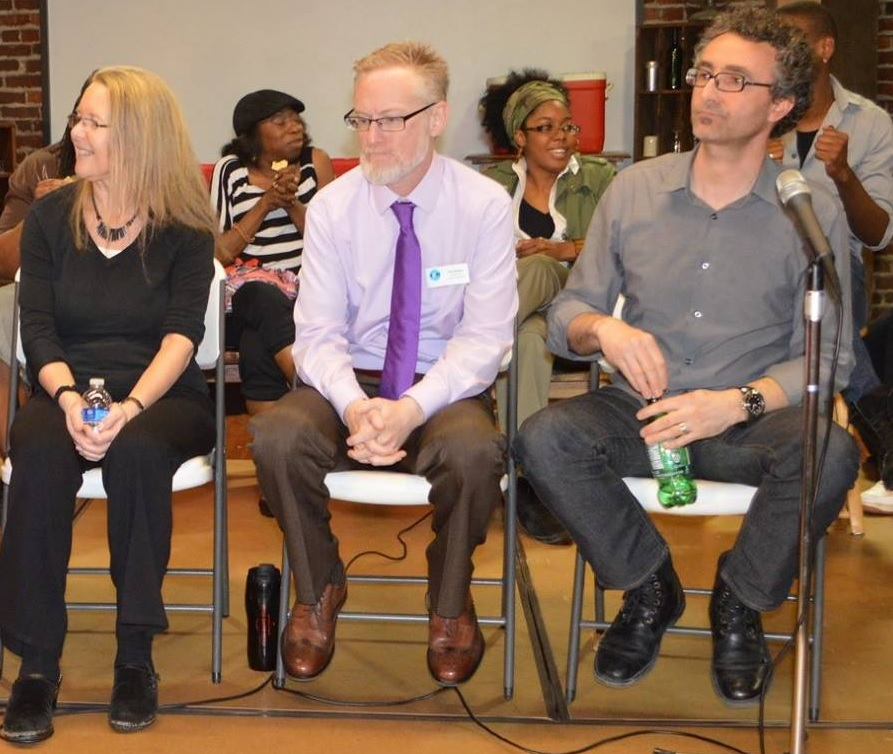
David Dunseith, the host of the BBC's Talkback programme

Talkback is BBC Radio Ulster's award-winning daily political and current-affairs phone-in programme, currently presented by William Crawley. It was launched on 8 September 1986 and runs from Monday to Friday, from just after the midday news to 1:30 pm (1 pm on the Radio Foyle simulcast).

== Overview ==
The programme's first presenter was Barry Cowan, who died in 2004, aged 56. Talkback took the Silver Award in the 2006 Sony Radio Academy Awards for the News and Current Affairs programme of the year, and the programme marked its 20th anniversary on 7 September 2006.

Barry Cowan was replaced as presenter in 1989 by David Dunseith — affectionately known by some Northern Ireland politicians as "the great interrupter". Until March 2009, just after Saturday's midday news headlines, he also presented the Best of Talkback which took a look back at the top stories covered by the Talkback team that previous week. The Saturday edition only lasted one hour.

Talkback has been described by The Guardian as "an alternative peace process", and by Stephen Coleman, Director of Studies at The Hansard Society for Parliamentary Government, as "a public sounding board which reaches a larger listening audience than any other European phone-in."

Following Dunseith's death in July 2011, Wendy Austin presented the show until she announced her resignation on 23 September 2014.

Since 3 November 2014, as a shake up of Radio Ulster, William Crawley has presented the show. Talkback celebrated its 30th anniversary on 8 September 2016.
