= Maureen Boyle =

Northern Irish poet

Maureen Boyle (born 1961) is a Northern Irish poet.

== Biography ==
Maureen Boyle was born and raised near Strabane in County Tyrone, Northern Ireland. Currently, Maureen Boyle is living in Belfast. She studied English at Trinity College, Dublin, graduating B.A in 1984. Her poems have been published in Fortnight Magazine, The Yellow Nib, and elsewhere. She is married to the Belfast journalist and writer Malachi O'Doherty. She teaches at St Dominic's Grammar School for Girls in Belfast.

== Awards ==
- Her poem "Weather Vane" won the Strokestown International Poetry Competition in 2007.
- She was the recipient in 2007 of the Ireland Chair of Poetry Prize for an emergent poet.
- She was a runner-up for the Patrick Kavanagh Poetry Award in 2004.
