= Olivia McVeigh =

Olivia McVeigh is a Northern Irish makeup artist, influencer and podcaster known for raising awareness of alopecia.

== Biography ==
McVeigh began losing her hair when she was 17 and was balding by when she was aged 21 due to the autoimmune disease alopecia. She trained as a make-up artist and posts about her hair loss and wearing wigs on her Instagram account. She also runs the Girls Groupchat Podcast with Diona Doherty, Jordan Arnold and Shannon Mitchell.

McVeigh lives in Tyrone and runs workshops on wigs in Northern Ireland. She has collaborated with brands including Pretty Little Wigs By Hollie, Baldy Lox Boutique and The Boulevard in Banbridge's alopecia billboard campaign.

== Awards ==
- Rising Star Award by Queen's University Belfast's Business School (2023).
- Hair & Beauty Influencer of the Year by Northern Ireland Social Media Awards (2023)
- BBC 100 Woman (2024).
