= Anna Carragher =

Anna Carragher OBE

Controller of BBC Northern Ireland
- In office 2000–2006
- Succeeded by: Peter Johnston

Personal details
- Born: 9 July 1948 (age 77)
- Spouse: Alain Le Garsmeur (divorced)
- Children: Three
- Parent(s): Thomas and Eileen Carragher
- Education: St Dominic's High School
- Alma mater: Queen's University Belfast

Anna Carragher OBE (born 9 July 1948) is an Irish former broadcasting executive and television producer. From 2000 to 2006, she was Controller of BBC Northern Ireland.

== Early life and education ==
Carragher was born on 9 July 1948 to Thomas Carragher and Eileen Carragher. Her father was a shipyard electrician and trade unionist, and Irish Labour councillor. Her parents were founding members of the Social Democratic and Labour Party (SDLP), which formed in 1970.

Carragher was educated St Dominic's High School, now called St Dominic's Grammar School for Girls, a Roman Catholic grammar school in Belfast, Northern Ireland. Her mother taught Maths at St Dominic's, and became the school's Vice-Principal in 1976. She studied English Language and Literature at Queen's University Belfast, graduating with a Bachelor of Arts (BA Hons) degree.

== Career ==
Carragher joined the British Broadcasting Corporation (BBC) in 1970. Her early years were spent in BBC Radio: she was a studio manager from 1970 to 1973, and then a producer for the BBC Radio 4 Today program from 1973 to 1981.

Carragher moved to BBC Television in the 1980s. Between 1981 and 1985, she worked as a producer for various Television News programs. In 1985, she joined BBC1's Question Time as its producer. She produced Radio 4's Any Questions? from 1989 to 1992. From 1992 to 1995, she worked on the new Five Live station, and was Editor of European and Correspondent Programmes for Radio 4.

Carragher became Head of Programmes at BBC Northern Ireland in 1995, and its first female Controller in 2000. She left the BBC on 17 November 2006; she had been with the BBC for thirty-six years.

Carragher was a member of the Northern Ireland Film and Television Commission from 1995 to 2001. Since 2009, she has been a Commissioner on the Equality Commission for Northern Ireland.

Carragher was appointed Officer of the Order of the British Empire (OBE) in the 2021 Birthday Honours for services to the arts in Northern Ireland.

== Personal life ==
In 1974, Carragher married Alain Le Garsmeur; the couple had two sons and a daughter. They have since divorced.

Media offices
Preceded by Pat Loughrey	Controller: BBC Northern Ireland; September 2000 - November 2006	Succeeded by Peter Johnston
