= Declan Harvey =

Irish journalist and broadcaster

- Born: Letterkenny, County Donegal, Ireland
- Education: Scoil Colmcille
- Alma mater: St Eunan's College; Rose Bruford College; London College of Communication
- Occupation: Broadcast journalist
- Known for: BBC Newsline; Evening Extra; Radio 1 Newsbeat; LBC Radio

Declan Harvey is a journalist and presenter with BBC News. He anchors the BBC's nightly television news programme in Northern Ireland, BBC Newsline, and the news podcast The State of Us for BBC Northern Ireland with Tara Mills.

== Background ==
Harvey holds a first-class honours degree in acting from Rose Bruford College.

== Journalism ==
Harvey qualified from the London College of Communication as a broadcast journalist in 2010. During his training, he volunteered at OnFM 101.4, a community radio station based in Hammersmith, where he presented a weekend magazine programme with Storm Huntley.

Harvey joined the Global radio group in 2010, as a reporter working across LBC, Classic FM, Capital FM and Heart.

In 2012, Harvey joined Newsbeat on BBC Radio 1, later becoming a political reporter.

In 2017, he became a frequent relief presenter on Newsday for the BBC World Service.

He relocated to Northern Ireland in 2017, becoming a news reporter for BBC News NI. In 2020, it was announced that he would become a full-time presenter of Evening Extra, alongside Tara Mills. The two would later be joined by Richard Morgan on a full-time basis.

Throughout 2021, Harvey co-created and co-hosted the BBC podcast Year '21, a 'week-by-week' telling of how Northern Ireland was created, exactly 100 years previous. In 2023, the team produced a follow-up series, Year '98 The Making of the Good Friday Agreement.

In December 2021, the BBC announced Harvey would become a main anchor of BBC Newsline.

== Awards and nominations ==
Year	Category	Awards	Programme/Station	
2011	Young Journalist of the Year	IRN Sky News Awards	LBC	Won
2014	National Radio Journalist of the Year	Sony Radio Awards	BBC Newsbeat	Finalist
2019	News Reporter of the Year	IMRO Irish Radio Awards	BBC News NI	Gold
2019	Best Documentary	New York Festivals Radio Awards	Did a Serial Killer Murder My Sister?	Bronze
2021	Best Podcast	New York Festivals Radio Awards	Year '21	Finalist
2021	Best News Programme	IMRO Irish Radio Awards	Evening Extra	Silver
2022	Best History Podcast	New York Festivals Radio Awards	Year '21	Silver
2022	News Broadcaster of the Year	IMRO Irish Radio Awards	BBC News NI	Gold
2023	News Broadcaster of the Year	IMRO Irish Radio Awards	BBC News NI	Gold

== Personal life ==
He was born in, and grew up in, Letterkenny.

As a youth, Harvey attended Scoil Colmcille and St Eunan's College for his education. As a child, he was a member of Rainbow Theatre Group. Harvey began working at Highland Radio as a summer job.

Declan lives with his partner, Ciaran, in Belfast.

== See also ==
- Good Morning Ulster
