= John Toal (broadcaster) =

Irish radio and television presenter

John Toal is an Irish broadcaster from Newry Co. Down who has worked for BBC Radio Ulster, BBC Radio 3, and RTE radio

He became a radio presenter while studying for a music degree at Queen's University, Belfast.. He presents the Sunday evening music show 'Classical Connections' and 'Saturday with John Toal', both of which have won numerous awards. His 'Saturday with John Toal' show won Gold at the IMRO Irish Radio Awards for 3 years in a row, in 2023, 2024 & 2025. He has won 10 Gold awards in the last 11 years, making him one of the most successful presenters ever in BBC NI Radio. He is a writer and regular contributor to the long-running 'Sunday Miscellany' programme on RTE Radio 1. On television he has presented in English and as Gaeilge for BBC and TG4.
