= Gerry Anderson (broadcaster) =

Northern Irish broadcaster

- Gerry Anderson
- Born: Gerald Michael Anderson; 28 October 1944; Derry, Northern Ireland
- Died: 21 August 2014 (aged 69); Belfast, Northern Ireland
- Occupation: Broadcaster
- Years active: 1963–2014

Gerald Michael Anderson (28 October 1944 – 21 August 2014) was a Northern Irish radio and television broadcaster for BBC Northern Ireland. Renowned for his unique style and distinctive sense of humour, Anderson often referred to himself on his show, as "Turkey Neck", "Puppet Chin" or "Golf Mike Alpha".

== Early life and career in music ==
Anderson was born in Derry in 1944, growing up in Sackville Street in the city centre. He was educated by the Irish Christian Brothers and went to work as an apprentice tool-maker and a clerk in a shipping firm. In 1963, having taught himself the guitar, he moved to Manchester where he worked in nightclubs. A tour of Scotland, England and Canada followed, with the showband The Chessmen. In 1972, while in Canada, Anderson joined a band called Ronnie Hawkins and the Hawks. He returned to Ireland where he gained a degree in sociology and social anthropology, and a postgraduate diploma in continuing education.

== Broadcasting in Northern Ireland ==
Anderson began his radio career at BBC Radio Foyle in 1984, the local station in his home city which he usually called "Stroke City" to reflect the difficulty regarding broadcasting the name of Derry/Londonderry (each name is preferred by a different part of the local community, Derry by Catholics/Nationalists, Londonderry by Protestants/Unionists). Starting with Making the Tea, on with music but then also moving on to talk shows. His programme was picked up by BBC Radio Ulster and given a wider audience. The Gerry Anderson Show was broadcast daily on BBC Radio Ulster from 10:30 am to 11:55 am, and calls made to the show form the basis of BBC NI's animated TV comedy series On The Air. Show regulars included Geordie Tuft a farmer from Loughbrickland, who offered advice to listeners on matters regarding farm animals (particularly goats), using Jeyes Fluid as a shampoo for dogs, and how to "dung out a bed".

Anderson was also instrumental in helping to launch the radio career of Paul McLoone, the frontman with the Northern Irish pop-punk group The Undertones and subsequently a radio presenter with the Irish national independent radio station, Today FM.

On the BBC Radio Ulster show, referring to his earlier career in music, he claimed to have met Elvis Presley and toured with Kris Kristofferson. His co-presenter on the show was Sean Coyle who has his own Wee Show on BBC Radio Foyle. In addition, Anderson presented various television series for BBC Northern Ireland, including a documentary on hair-loss called Gerry Anderson's Losing It. In 2013, Anderson was also the "monumental" guest on Northern Ireland-based comedy panel show, Monumental.

== Stroke City ==
His contribution to solving the Derry/Londonderry name dispute was to popularise the jocular name "Stroke City" (from the "/" in the city's neutral designation), which became the title of one of his radio programmes from 1992 leading some of his friends to rename him "Gerry/Londongerry". The programmes were broadcast nationally on Radio 4.

== Radio 4 ==
In 1994, BBC Radio 4 contracted the broadcaster to present an afternoon magazine programme running from 3 to 4 pm. The audience reaction to Anderson Country was polarised with listeners divided over its shift in tone from the rest of Radio 4. After a year Anderson Country was dropped, although the programme continued as The Afternoon Shift for another three years with different presenters. Anderson returned to Northern Ireland where he remained popular, sometimes presenting television as well as radio, and continued to make new programmes for Radio 4 such as Gerry's Bar.

== Awards ==
- Gold Sony Award 1990 for Best Regional Broadcaster
- Broadcaster of the Year at the Entertainment and Media Awards, 1991, 1992 and 1993
- Radio Academy Hall of Fame
- Royal Television Society Regional Presenter of the Year 2004

== Publications ==
The semi-autobiographical Surviving Stroke City, was published in 1999.

The main entrance to the cathedral was directly below us and therefore out of sight. When a particular service called for the local bishop to enter in some splendour, we were required to sing the celebratory hymn 'Ecce Sacerdos', which I quickly realised was the bishop's 'signature' tune. When it was time for his glorious entry, the worker-bee priest at the altar, seemingly involved in communication with the Higher One, was, in fact, informing the organist via a series of complicated hand signals (observed through the wing mirrors on the organ) of the progress of the bishop. When the proper psychological moment arrived to give the bishop's entry maximum clout, a signal was made, the organ blared majestically, and we lustily sang our hearts out for the benefit of the fat prelate who strode airily down the aisle whilst the lumpen proletariat clamoured to clutch the hem of his raiment. In a flash I realised that this wasn't religion at all. It was show business. (extract from Surviving Stroke City by Gerry Anderson)

- Autobiography: Surviving Stroke City (Hutchinson, 1999).
- Memoir: HEADS – A Day in the Life (Gill & Macmillan, 2008).

== Death ==
Anderson died on 21 August 2014, aged 69, following a long illness. Requiem Mass for the radio presenter was held at St Eugene's Cathedral.

A year later, on 18 September 2015, Anderson was posthumously inducted into the PPI Hall of Fame.
