= Stephen McAnena =

Writer from Northern Ireland

- Occupation: Writer

Stephen McAnena is a writer from Belfast, Northern Ireland.

He wrote the short film The Good Son (1998), nominated for the Critics' Week Award at the 1999 Cannes Film Festival. This was followed by the BBC Schools film Some Things I Don't Know (2000), nominated for a BAFTA in 2001. In 2002 he collaborated with Nell Leyshon on the radio play Milk, winner of the Richard Imison Award in 2003. Also in 2002, he wrote the Irish language short film Ocras, winner of the UIP Award at that year's Cork Film Festival.

In 2003 McAnena wrote his first stage play, Stevie's Big Game, for Partisan Productions and the Ballynafeigh Community Development Association. He wrote and produced the low budget horror film Nailed (2006), and in 2008 he was the writer of a graphic novel, Back on the Road, drawn by Will Simpson and various local artists, published by the Ballynafeigh Community Development Association.
