= Your Place and Mine =

Northern Irish radio programme

Your Place and Mine is a Northern Irish radio programme.

The programme went on air for the first time in September 1991 and "was commissioned to bring something different to Saturday mornings on BBC Radio Ulster, which was originally music focused.'

The programme is best understood as the radio equivalent of a local newspaper with feature stories and interviews from non-professional though highly experienced local correspondents who use Radio Ulster's network of studios across Northern Ireland to feed into the programme.

John Toal presented the programme from 1993 to 2001 but as of 2018 the presenter is the Portstewart native Anne Marie McAleese, who first presented the programme in 1991.

It is broadcast on BBC Radio Ulster on Saturday mornings from 8:05 to 8:55 am.
