= Arts Extra =

Arts Extra is a Northern Irish arts and entertainment programme broadcast on BBC Radio Ulster. The programme is presented by Marie-Louise Muir, airs each weekday at 6:30pm and reports on film, music, books and the visual arts.
