= Sunday Sequence (BBC Radio Ulster) =

BBC Northern Ireland's Sunday morning speech radio programme Sunday Sequence has a magazine format and a focus on religion, ethics and current affairs.

Sunday Sequence is one of BBC Radio Ulster's longest running programmes having been on-air since September 14, 1980.

It is presented week-about by Róisín McAuley] and Audrey Carville. It was previously presented by William Crawley (2002–2014) Etta Halliday, Patrick Speight, Alison Hilliard, Davy Sims and Trevor Williams (bishop).

The producer is currently Séamus Boyd, who replaced Martin O'Brien, who produced the programme since 1995.

Sunday Sequence won two Andrew Cross Awards in 2002, one of them for its response to September 11, 2011. It won a third Andrew Cross Award as well as a commendation in 2006 in the UK radio speech programme of the year category for a special programme responding to the death of Pope John Paul II.

Sunday Sequence is currently broadcast on BBC Radio Ulster, every Sunday morning from 8.30 - 10.15 a.m. An edited weekly podcast, Everyday Ethics, is available to download shortly after each broadcast.
