= Hugo Duncan =

Northern Irish singer and presenter

Hugo Duncan MBE
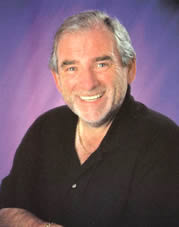
- Born: 26 March 1950 (age 76); Strabane, County Tyrone, Northern Ireland
- Occupations: Radio presenter, singer

Hugo Anthony Duncan MBE (born 26 March 1950) is a singer and BBC broadcaster born in Strabane, County Tyrone, Northern Ireland in 1950. His nickname is "The wee man from Strabane" or "Uncle Hugo".

== Career ==
In the early 1970s, he was spotted on a TV talent show on RTÉ and signed by the then fledgling Release Records, which later spawned such stars as Philomena Begley, Ray Lynam, and Eurovision star Johnny Logan.

By the time he was twenty-one he had formed his own band, Hugo Duncan and the Tall Men, and had a number one hit in the Irish charts with "Dear God".

Hugo joined Radio Foyle during the 1980s doing holiday relief, after which he was offered a job presenting his own show on a weekly basis. He also presents a show on Radio Foyle, every Sunday from 14:00 to 16:00.

From 1997 to 2002, Duncan co-hosted "Town Challenge" with George Jones, Christine Lampard and Tom McDermott.

In October 1998, he was given the opportunity to present Hugo Duncan's Country Afternoon on Radio Ulster each weekday from 13:30 to 15:00. The theme tune used on his BBC Radio Ulster show is "Rocky Top", while he closes each programme with "Yakety Sax" (also known as the theme to The Benny Hill Show). In 2023, Duncan celebrated 25 years with Radio Ulster.

In 2001, along with Eamonn Holmes, Hugo appeared in episode two of series one of popular BBC NI comedy Give My Head Peace.

Hugo is also a member of BBC Northern Ireland's team during their annual Children in Need appeal. In 2006, Hugo dressed up as Britney Spears and performed a version of her song "...Baby One More Time".

In 2017 Duncan was declared bankrupt.

In addition to his radio work, and Belfast Telegraph column, Duncan plays regularly on the live circuit with shows throughout Ireland on a nightly basis, and regular tours to England and Scotland.
