= Noel Thompson =

British journalist

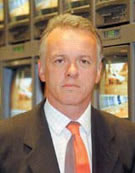

Noel Thompson is a Northern Irish news journalist with BBC Northern Ireland. He was part of the presenting team for BBC Radio Ulster's flagship morning programme Good Morning Ulster.

== Journalism career ==
Thompson began his broadcasting career at the BBC in 1979 as a researcher for Nationwide in Belfast. He progressed through the corporation's internal training scheme, working on Multi-Coloured Swap Shop and Newsround.

In addition to his broadcasting career at BBC Northern Ireland, Thompson has presented Newsnight and BBC Breakfast and, for a period, occasionally guest presented on BBC News Channel and BBC News' politics and arts interview programme HARDtalk.

Thompson was awarded Royal Television Society Regional TV Presenter of the Year for two consecutive years: 1997 and 1998. He was also nominated in the same category in 1999. In 2007, Thompson received an Award of Distinction from Belfast Metropolitan College for his services to journalism. It was announced in 2019 that Thompson would retire from the corporation in 2020 along with three other BBC presenters.

== Personal life ==
Thompson studied at Campbell College in Belfast and St Catharine's College, Cambridge, reading MML (French and German), then Social and Political Sciences.

Prior to joining the BBC, Thompson worked in a bar at the Europa Hotel in Belfast, and he also managed his brother's restaurant in the West Indies.

He sings baritone with the Belfast Philharmonic and has regularly performed in classical concerts as a member of the choir alongside the Ulster Orchestra. He is also a wildlife photographer and mountain walker.
