= Good Morning Ulster =

Northern Irish radio breakfast show

Good Morning Ulster is the flagship Northern Irish radio breakfast news programme BBC Radio Ulster, broadcast weekdays from 6:30 am to 9 am and produced by BBC News Northern Ireland.

The main presenting team is Sarah Brett and Chris Buckler: this core team is augmented with Joel Taggart, Mark Devenport, Declan Harvey and Jayne McCormack.

Good Morning Ulster based Studio 4 at the BBC's Broadcasting House in Belfast. Unlike the other main studios at Broadcasting House, Studio 4 sits within the newsroom itself.

In November 2019 Noel Thompson and Karen Patterson both announced they would be stepping down from Good Morning Ulster, effective from January 2020.

It is often cited as one of the most listened to breakfast radio programmes in Northern Ireland.

== Regular features ==
- Business (with Sara Neil)
- Sport
- Weather
- Thought For The Day
- Farming News (with Elaine Mitchell)

== Previous presenters ==
- Wendy Austin
- Seamus McKee
- Conor Bradford
- Declan Lawn
- Mark Carruthers
- Mike Nesbitt
- Barry Cowan
- Karen Patterson
- Noel Thompson
