= Broadcasting House, Belfast =

British TV centre in Northern Ireland

Coordinates: 54.594°N 5.930°W

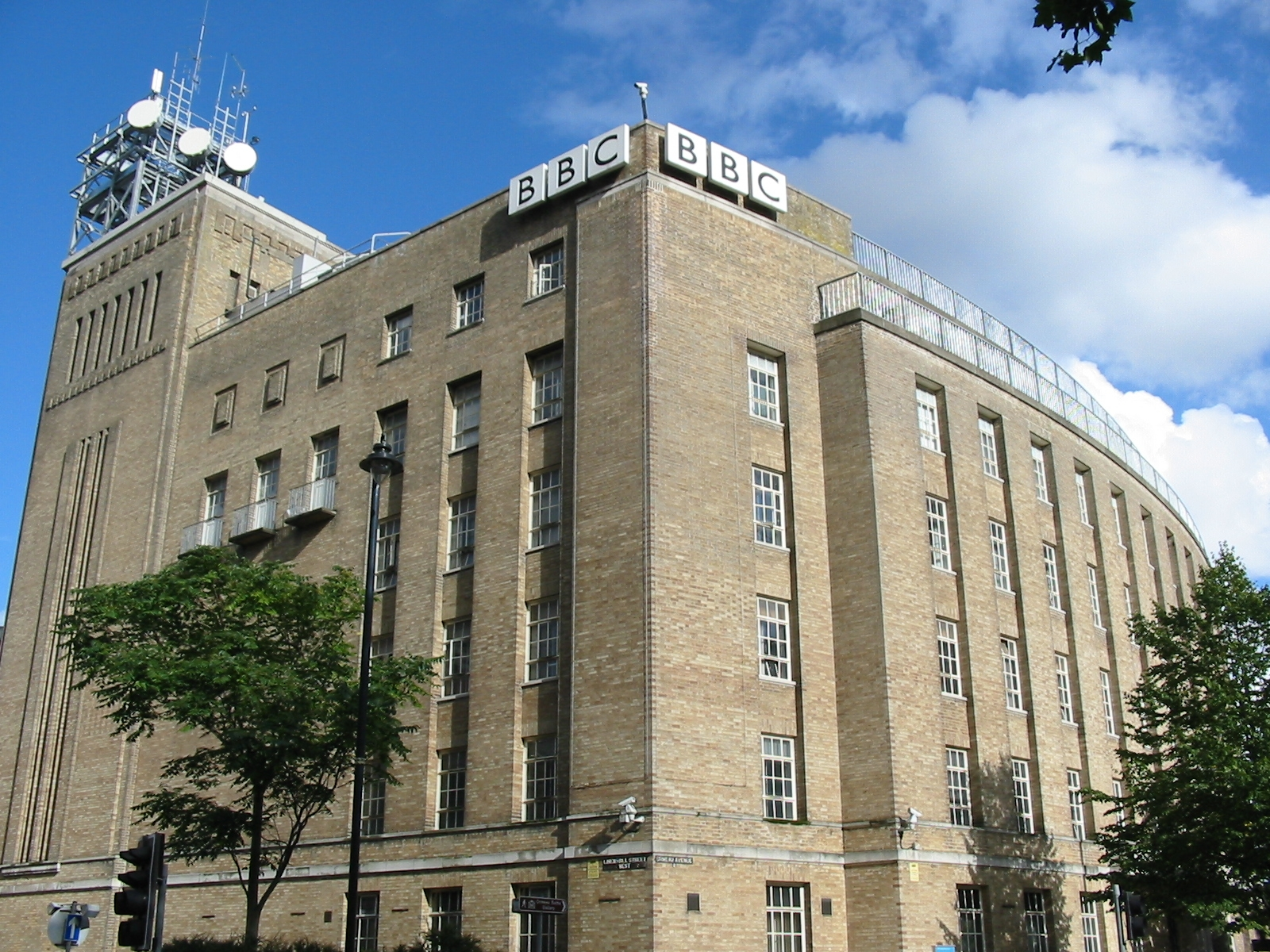
Broadcasting House, Belfast

Broadcasting House, Belfast is the headquarters of BBC Northern Ireland and operates many of its broadcasting services. The building is located on Ormeau Avenue in Belfast city centre, at the junction with Bedford Street. Public tours of the building are available.

== History ==
The building was designed by George James Miller of James Miller & Sons of Glasgow in 1936 and completed in 1938.

BBC Broadcasting House in Belfast has many radio studios, some self-operated, some staffed, used for the BBC's main local radio station in Northern Ireland – BBC Radio Ulster, as well as being used by the BBC for other radio productions. There is also a news studio for radio news bulletins, a newsroom which provides news gathering for both television and radio news services for BBC Northern Ireland, along with production offices, makeup, green room, dressing rooms and hospitality/cafeteria services.

Broadcasting House is linked by satellite and cable to the whole BBC network, and is able to link to broadcasters around the world through the BBC's global link ups.

BBC Broadcasting House in Belfast has two main television studios named Studio B and Studio 1. Studio B is a 2,000 sq ft (190 m^{2}) studio, home to BBC Northern Ireland's local news programme BBC Newsline, as well as home to other news/politics/current affairs programming. Studio 1 is a 2,200 sq ft (200 m^{2}) studio, and is used for small productions. It can accommodate an audience of around one hundred if needed, and is ideal for small productions, interviews and is also used for media training purposes. There is also a small presentation studio and a small CSO studio used for small news bulletins, weather, or single-camera interviews.

BBC Northern Ireland's main 5,000 sq ft (460 m^{2}) television studio called Studio A is not based at the BBC Broadcasting House, but is located a number of streets away at BBC Blackstaff House on Great Victoria Street in Belfast.
