= BBC Radio Ulster =

Northern Irish radio station

Coordinates: 54.594°N 5.930°W

- Logo used since 2022
- Belfast; Northern Ireland
- Frequencies: FM: 92–95 MHz; DAB: 12D; Freeview: 711 (NI only); Freesat: 716; Sky (UK only): 0116; Virgin Media: 932; Virgin Media Ireland: 906; Online:
- RDS: BBC Ulst

Programming
- Format: News, talk, sport and music

Ownership
- Owner: BBC
- Operator: BBC Northern Ireland
- Sister stations: BBC Radio Foyle

History
- First air date: 1 January 1975; 51 years ago
- Former frequencies: 873 MW; 1341 MW

Technical information
- Licensing authority: Ofcom

Links
- Website: www.bbc.co.uk/radioulster

BBC Radio Ulster is a Northern Irish national radio station owned and operated by BBC Northern Ireland, a division of the BBC. It was established on New Year's Day 1975, replacing what had been an opt-out of BBC Radio 4.

According to RAJAR, the station broadcasts to a weekly audience of 462,000 with a listening share of 16.2% as of March 2024.

== Overview ==
Previous BBC Radio Ulster logo from 2007 till 2022.

It is the most widely listened to radio station in Northern Ireland, with a diverse range of programmes, including news, talk, features, music and sport. In the Q3 2021 RAJAR survey, the station had 517,000 weekly listeners, with total weekly listening hours of 5.5 million, beating its main local rivals (Cool FM, Downtown Radio, Downtown Country, U105, and Q Radio) on both of these metrics and, logically therefore, average weekly hours per listener (10.64). When taken together, the Bauer-owned stations (both Downtown stations and Cool FM) had higher total audience and listening hours per week, but lower average weekly hours per listener. The station had 135,000 more weekly listeners than its equivalent in Wales, BBC Radio Wales, despite serving a RAJAR population 1.1 million smaller. The station had the highest percentage reach and listening share, per corresponding survey area, of any BBC local, nations or national radio station, at 34% and 19.9% respectively.

It is broadcast from BBC Northern Ireland's Broadcasting House in Belfast. News bulletins are broadcast usually on the hour seven days a week from 6:30 am until midnight (on weekdays), from 6:45 am until midnight (on Saturdays) and from 7:00 am to midnight (on weekends, Christmas holidays, and Bank Holidays). It is available on 92-95 FM, DAB and Freeview in Northern Ireland and across the UK on BBC Sounds and satellite/cable television. It is also available in Ireland via BBC Sounds, Virgin Media, on smart speakers or on FM in counties bordering Northern Ireland. The station was available on medium wave on 1341 kHz and 873 kHz until 6 May 2021.

An opt-out of the station exists in Derry, BBC Radio Foyle, carrying alternative programming and news between 8:00am and 4:00pm weekdays. The station is also broadcast on DAB Digital Radio, digital television and on the Internet. During the station's downtime, BBC Radio Ulster simulcasts BBC Radio 5 Live programming.

== Funding ==
The BBC reported in the Annual Report for 2017/18 that Radio Ulster and Radio Foyle operated on a budget of £17.6 million with a 38% reach of the population and that the cost per hour of output was 5.8p.

== Programmes ==
- Good Morning Ulster
- The Nolan Show
- Talkback
- Evening Extra
- Blas
- Country Afternoon with Hugo Duncan
- Gardener's Corner
- Countryside
- Vinny & Cate
- Anne-Marie Wallace
- Alright, Pet?
- Connor Philips Show
- The Lynette Fay Show
- Assume Nothing
- Across the Line
- Jazz Club
- On Your Behalf
- Sounds Classical
- Sunday Sequence
- Radio Ulster Folk Club
- Ralph McLean (BBC Radio Ulster)
- The John Toal Show
- The Foodie (BBC Radio Ulster)
- Kerry McLean
- Your Place and Mine
- The Blame Game

Thought for the Day

== Notable presenters ==
- Joel Taggart
- Chris Buckler
- Sarah Brett
- Stephen Nolan
- Connor Philips
- William Crawley
- Hugo Duncan
- Lynette Fay
- Nicola Weir
- Declan Harvey
- Tara Mills
- Richard Morgan
- Sean Coyle
- Sara Neil (business reporter)
- Linda McAuley
- Tim McGarry
- Vinny Hurrell
- Kerry McLean
- Cate Conway
- Brian D'Arcy
- Stephen McCauley
- Ralph McLean
- Rigsy
- John Toal
- Anne-Marie Wallace
- Mickey Bradley

=== Previous presenters ===
- Gerry Anderson
- Seamus McKee
- Stephen Clements
- Gerry Kelly
- Wendy Austin
- Karen Patterson
- Conor Bradford
- Sean Rafferty
- Noel Thompson
- Kim Lenaghan (died in 2022)
