= BBC One Northern Ireland =

- Logo used since 2021.
- Country: United Kingdom
- Broadcast area: Northern Ireland; Republic of Ireland
- Network: BBC One

Programming
- Picture format: 576i SDTV; 1080i HDTV

Ownership
- Owner: BBC Northern Ireland
- Sister channels: BBC Two Northern Ireland

History
- Launched: 21 July 1955; 71 years ago
- Former names: BBC TV Service NI(21 July 1955 – 19 April 1964); BBC Northern Ireland (20 April 1964 – 14 November 1969)

Availability

Terrestrial
- Freeview: Channel 1 Channel 101 (HD)

Streaming media
- FilmOn: Watch live

Former BBC One Northern Ireland logo, used from 2006 to 2021.

BBC One Northern Ireland is a Northern Irish free-to-air television channel owned and operated by BBC Northern Ireland. It is the Northern Irish variation of the UK-wide BBC One network.

The service is broadcast from Broadcasting House in Belfast. In the rest of the UK, BBC One Northern Ireland is available as a regional variant on most TV service providers. In the Republic of Ireland, BBC One Northern Ireland is available as a standard channel.

== History ==
On 24 October 2012, an HD variation of BBC One Northern Ireland was launched, to coincide with the completion of the digital switchover process in Northern Ireland. On 18 November 2013, BBC One Northern Ireland HD was swapped with the SD channel on Sky's EPG for HD subscribers.

The BBC One Northern Ireland branding is utilised from 6 am until late with live continuity handled by a team of regional announcers who double up as playout directors. The channel's main competitor is UTV while also competing with RTÉ One, RTÉ Two and Virgin Media One from the Republic of Ireland. Although BBC One NI and UTV are competitors, on the final night of UK digital switchover, BBC One NI and UTV joined forces for a special simulcast, The Magic Box, with Eamonn Holmes, celebrating 60 years of TV history.
