= BBC Radio Foyle =

Northern Irish radio station

- Logo used since 2022
- Derry; Northern Ireland
- Broadcast area: County Londonderry
- Frequencies: FM: 93.1 MHz; DAB: 12D; Freeview: 712 (NI only); Freesat: 717; Sky: 0135 (NI only); Sky: 0154 (UK-wide); Virgin Media: 933
- RDS: BBC FYLE

Programming
- Format: News, talk, sport and music
- Network: BBC Radio Ulster

Ownership
- Owner: BBC
- Operator: BBC Northern Ireland

History
- First air date: 11 September 1979; 47 years ago
- Former frequencies: 792 MW

Technical information
- Licensing authority: Ofcom
- Transmitter coordinates: 55.005512°N 7.325885°W

Links
- Website: www.bbc.co.uk/radiofoyle

BBC Radio Foyle is a County Londonderry local radio station owned and operated by BBC Northern Ireland, a division of the BBC. It is named after the River Foyle which flows through Derry, the city where the station is based.

It is an opt-out from BBC Radio's main Northern Ireland service, BBC Radio Ulster. Recent budget cuts saw some reduction in local programming, which now only airs during the week – currently airing between 8:00am and 4:00pm, along with some local evening programming. At all other times, and throughout the weekend, the station's frequencies carry BBC Radio Ulster.

== History ==
BBC Radio Foyle started broadcasting on 11 September 1979; up until then, and especially during the Troubles, Derry had occasional opt-outs. As of March 1986, it broadcast for four hours a day (1–5pm), beginning with a 40-minute news service, which started with a relay of the 1pm bulletin from Radio 4.

== Broadcasting ==
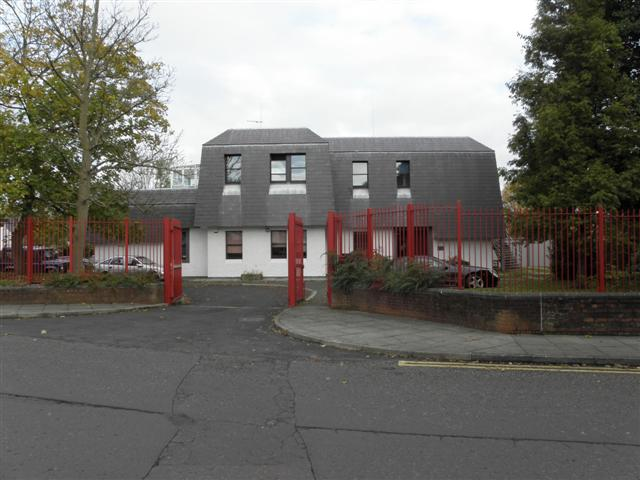
Radio Foyle Studio, Derry (2009)

The station broadcasts from BBC's Northland Road studios on 93.1 FM in Derry. It was available on 792 kHz medium wave until 6 May 2021.

There is also a small television studio based there used for interviews where guests sit in front of a CSO screen which normally has a live view of Derry. Since it broadcasts from a point close to the border between County Londonderry and County Donegal in the Republic of Ireland, it includes some coverage of the latter county.

== Digital ==
BBC Radio Foyle is available online and is carried on Freeview in Northern Ireland (occupying the slot held by BBC Radio nan Gàidheal in Scotland and by BBC Radio Cymru in Wales). It was not initially available on DAB digital radio, however; the Northern Ireland multiplex licence only requires carriage of Radio Ulster.

In June 2010, the BBC announced a trial scheme under which Radio Foyle would be available on DAB as a part-time sidecar station to Radio Ulster, using a similar format as the part-time longwave-programming optouts of BBC Radio 4 on the BBC National DAB multiplex. During this trial, the bitrate of Radio Ulster would drop during Foyle's separate broadcast hours, with Foyle carried as a split audio stream in the remaining space; outside of split shows, the full bitrate would revert to Radio Ulster.

When the Digital One ensemble commenced broadcasting in Northern Ireland certain stations that used Digital One in the rest of the UK left the Northern Ireland ensemble, leaving space for Radio Foyle to broadcast in stereo and without the need for the Radio Ulster capacity to be split.

Following the closure of the medium wave services of BBC Radio Ulster and BBC Radio Foyle on 6 May 2021, the digital frequencies of BBC Radio Foyle have been used for split sports programming formerly broadcast on 1341 kHz and 792 kHz.
