= BBC Northern Ireland =

Main public service broadcaster in Northern Ireland

- BBC Northern Ireland logo

- BBC Northern Ireland's area within the UK
- TV stations: BBC One Northern Ireland; BBC Two Northern Ireland
- Radio stations: BBC Radio Ulster; BBC Radio Foyle
- Headquarters: Broadcasting House, Ormeau Avenue, Belfast, Northern Ireland
- Area: Northern Ireland and the Republic of Ireland
- Launch date: 15 September 1924; 102 years ago
- Official website: www.bbc.co.uk/northernireland
- Language: English; Irish

BBC Northern Ireland is a division of the BBC and the main public broadcaster in Northern Ireland. It is widely available across both Northern Ireland and the Republic of Ireland.

BBC Northern Ireland is one of the four BBC national regions, together with the BBC English Regions, BBC Scotland and BBC Cymru Wales. Based in Broadcasting House, Belfast, it provides television, radio, online and interactive television content. BBC Northern Ireland currently employs 700 people, largely in Belfast.

BBC Northern Ireland has two TV channels – BBC One Northern Ireland, and BBC Two Northern Ireland; and two radio stations – BBC Radio Ulster and BBC Radio Foyle.

== Television ==
The logo of BBC Northern Ireland between 1988 and 1997.

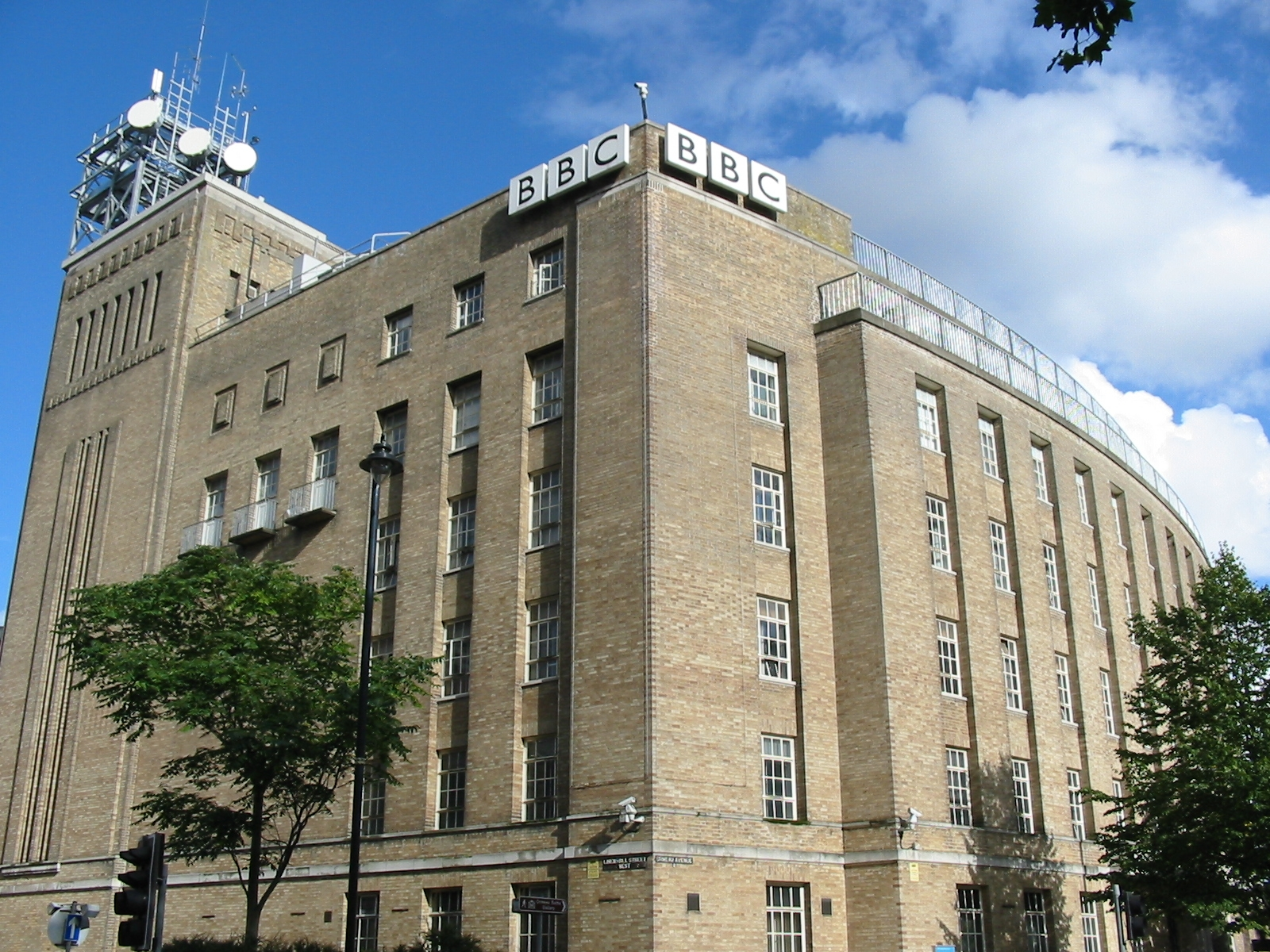
Broadcasting House, Belfast, Headquarters of the BBC in Northern Ireland.

BBC Northern Ireland operates two television stations: BBC One Northern Ireland and BBC Two Northern Ireland. BBC Northern Ireland funds an opt-out service with the majority of this output being made in the independent sector. Some output that originates in London (so-called 'network' programmes) are time-shifted to create appropriate slots for programming that is more appealing to the BBC audience in NI.

Prior to 27 October 2006, BBC Two NI was a digital only service while BBC Two Northern Ireland was available on analogue transmission. Since 28 October 2006, BBC Two Northern Ireland has been the on-air name for both services which have been merged.

BBC Northern Ireland has its own team of continuity announcers which introduce the vast majority of programmes on BBC One and BBC Two in Northern Ireland.

=== Regional television ===
- BBC Newsline is the regional news service. The main bulletin is from 18.30 to 19.00 with shorter bulletins at 13.30 and 22.30 and during the weekend, with summaries on BBC Breakfast. BBC NI produces some regional political programmes, notably Spotlight, The View and Nolan Live.

=== Network output ===
As well as programmes intended purely for an audience in NI, BBC Northern Ireland also funds or often co-funds output for pan-UK consumption on both the player and other BBC channels. in 2021 network output is principally in drama.

It was announced in June 2019 that the BBC quiz show Mastermind would now be produced from BBC NI.

BBC Northern Ireland also engages in co-productions with other broadcasting networks, including with the Irish broadcasters RTÉ and TG4.

=== Republic of Ireland ===
- BBC One Northern Ireland and BBC Two Northern Ireland are widely available across the border in the Republic of Ireland. These channels are carried on pay-TV platforms in the Republic including Sky Ireland, Virgin Media Ireland, Magnet Networks, SCTV and Crossan Cable. BBC One NI and BBC Two NI are also available in the Republic via signal overspill by Freeview in counties near the Northern Ireland border. Similarly, prior to the digital switchover in 2012, they were available in these areas via analogue television.
- Additional BBC channels such as BBC Three, BBC Four, BBC News, BBC World News and children's television channels CBBC and CBeebies, are also available within the Republic of Ireland via a free-to-air satellite receiver or, in some areas near the border, via overspill from the Freeview service. Leading subscription TV providers also carry these channels.

== Radio ==
BBC Northern Ireland operates two radio stations:

- BBC Radio Ulster, on 92–95 FM, (and previously on 1341 kHz Medium Wave, that is now discontinued), which broadcasts throughout Northern Ireland, and
- BBC Radio Foyle, on 93.1 FM, (and previously on 792 Medium Wave), which broadcasts to the North West of Northern Ireland

BBC Northern Ireland takes part in the 'Regionalisation' of some of the BBC's national radio output. From the late 1990s until 2012, for example, Radio 1 split the home nations on Thursday morning from midnight to 2 a.m., with Scotland, Wales and Northern Ireland broadcasting their own shows to showcase regional talent. The Radio 1 session from Northern Ireland was last presented by Phil Taggart from Omagh.

== Online ==
BBC Northern Ireland's online service provides News, Sport, Schools, Learning and Programme information for television and radio programmes. It provides a streaming audio service for Radio Ulster and Radio Foyle as well as every programme on demand for up to a week after transmission. bbc.co.uk/northernireland/ is part of BBC Online and operated from the Belfast base. It also provides multi platform interactivity for TV programmes including the annual Schools' Cup Rugby union and Gaelic Athletic Association finals.

== Programmes ==
=== Radio ===
- Good Morning Ulster
- The Nolan Show
- Gardeners' Corner
- Talkback
- Evening Extra
- Sunday Sequence

=== Television ===
- BBC Newsline
- Spotlight
- The View
- The Blame Game
- Beauty Queen & Single
- The Paddy Raff Show
- Give My Head Peace
- Chancers
- Soft Border Patrol
- Belfast FM
- Funboys
- Religious Services

=== Television news bulletins ===
- Ulster Mirror (1950s)
- Scene Around Six (1969 – September 1984)
- Inside Ulster (September 1984 – 12 February 1996)
- Newsline 6.30/Newsline/BBC Newsline (12 February 1996 to date)

=== Selection of network programmes ===
- Ballykissangel (late 1990s)
- Sesame Tree (Children's Series, late 2000s)
- Murphy's Law
- Patrick Kielty Almost Live

=== Sports ===
BBC NI has, at various times, over the last decades of the 20th century and the early decades of the 21st, provided live and pre-recorded coverage of all three major male sports in Northern Ireland – Irish League soccer, Ulster Rugby and GAA. In the increasingly expensive world of sports rights and contracts the regional output has never covered all three concurrently but covers the sports extensively in radio news bulletins.

=== Languages ===
BBC Northern Ireland broadcasts almost exclusively in English, but there is some output in Irish and Ulster Scots. Radio Ulster carries a daily programme in Irish and there is an Irish language section on BBC Northern Ireland's website. Northern Ireland Screen helps co-fund television output in both Irish and Ulster Scots.

=== Technical ===
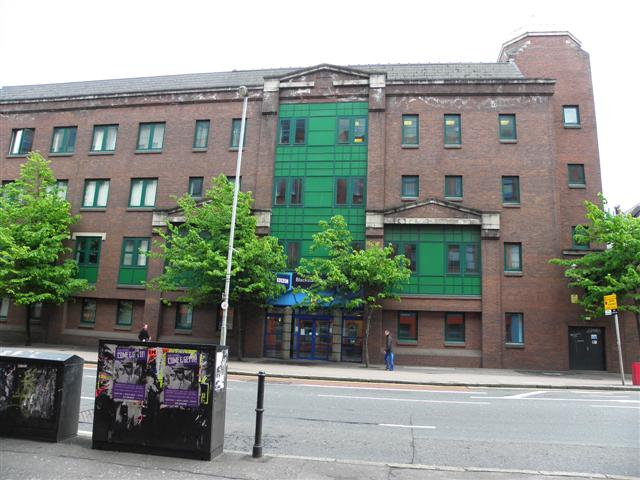
BBC Blackstaff House

The BBC television and radio stations are broadcast primarily from the Divis (500 kW), Limavady and Brougher Mountain transmitters. Both transmitters receive the BBC stations via a satellite feeds and each transmitter has a wealth of relay transmitters to provide analogue service to areas not served by their respective main transmitter.

=== TV Studios ===
BBC Northern Ireland has three main television studios located in Belfast. There are two small studios located in the BBC Broadcasting House in Belfast. These are home to BBC Northern Ireland's regional news and current affairs programmes. They are around 2,000 sq ft (190 m^{2}) each and are called Studio B and Studio 1.

The largest of the studios is called Studio A which is located in the BBC Blackstaff House on Great Victoria Street in Belfast. The studio measures 6,000 sq ft (560 m^{2}). Studio A has been home to the award-winning local sitcom Give My Head Peace. Nolan Live for BBC One Northern Ireland airs live from Studio A.

== BBC NI broadcasters ==
=== Current BBC NI broadcasters ===
- Taylor Johnson - BBC Introducing in Northern Ireland with Taylor Johnson
- Sarah Brett – Good Morning Ulster
- Chris Buckler – Good Morning Ulster
- Stephen Nolan – presenter of The Nolan Show on BBC Radio Ulster, Nolan Live on BBC One NI and a weekend phone-in programme on BBC Radio 5 Live
- Tara Mills – presenter of BBC Newsline and Evening Extra
- Declan Harvey – presenter of BBC Newsline and Evening Extra
- Mark Carruthers – presenter Sunday Politics NI and The View
- Richard Morgan – presenter Evening Extra
- Connor Phillips
- Hugo Duncan – presenter of Country Afternoon on BBC Radio Ulster

=== Former BBC NI broadcasters ===
- Gerry Anderson – presented The Gerry Anderson Show on BBC Radio Ulster/Foyle and famed for broadcasting without a script.
- Lynette Fay
- Stephen Grimason – editor of BBC Northern Ireland
- Gloria Hunniford – BBC Northern Ireland presenter who had her own daily show on Radio Ulster before a move to BBC Radio 2
- Patrick Kielty – comedian
- Colin Murray – Talksport presenter and former BBC Radio 1 DJ started with BBC Radio Ulster as a presenter on the Across the Line programme
- Sean Rafferty – former presenter of Scene Around Six and Inside Ulster, evening news programmes broadcast until the mid-1990s, as well as BBC Radio Ulster news programmes, now a BBC Radio 3 music presenter
- Noel Thompson
- Donna Traynor
