= Timeline of television in Northern Ireland =

This is a timeline of television in Northern Ireland.

== 1950s ==
- 1953
  - 1 May – Television becomes available in Northern Ireland for the first time although initially from a temporary transmitter at Glencairn, brought into service in time for the Queen's Coronation.
- 1954
  - 26 November – The BBC launches a fortnightly news magazine called Ulster Mirror.
- 1955
  - 21 July – The Divis transmitting station is switched on and becomes the first permanent transmitter in Northern Ireland.
- 1956
  - No events.
- 1957
  - 30 September – BBC Northern Ireland launches a daily news bulletin called Today in Northern Ireland and replaces Ulster Mirror.
  - 18 December – Television comes to the north western parts of Northern Ireland following the switching on of the Londonderry transmitter which provided the BBC Television Service to the north west.
- 1958
  - September – The Independent Television Authority, advertises the franchise for Northern Ireland. Two consortia apply and the ITA eventually persuaded both applicants to merge their bids to obtain the new franchise, on the provision that a greater stake of investment in the station was offered to Catholic sources.
- 1959
  - 20 February – A new magazine programme, Studio Eight, launches. It supplements the now ten-minute Today in Northern Ireland news bulletin.
  - 31 October – Ulster Television launches at 4:45pm from the Black Mountain transmitter located in Belfast. The signal from the transmitter could not cover the whole of Northern Ireland, with plans placed for the opening of another transmitter in the western part of Northern Ireland within a few years.

== 1960s ==
- 1960
  - No events.
- 1961
  - No events.
- 1962
  - Ulster opens a second studio at its Havelock House, Belfast base.
  - 17 September – Today in Northern Ireland is replaced by a 20-minute programme called Six O'Clock.
- 1963
  - 18 February – The Strabane transmitter opens, bringing ITV coverage to the west of Northern Ireland for the first time.
- 1964
  - Newsview replaces Roundabout as Ulster's regional news programme.
  - 24 February – The Brougher Mountain transmitting station is switched on, bringing BBC Television to the western areas of Northern Ireland.
- 1965
  - No events.
- 1966
  - 11 June – BBC2 Northern Ireland goes on the air, broadcast only from the Divis transmitter.
- 1967
  - No events.
- 1968
  - January – Scene Around Six launches on BBC Northern Ireland.
  - 3 August – A technicians strike forces ITV off the air for several weeks although management manage to launch a temporary ITV Emergency National Service with no regional variations, with Ulster Television simply taking the network feed and schedule from London. The strike ends on 18 August.
- 1969
  - UTV Reports replaces Roundabout as Ulster's regional news programme.

== 1970s ==
- 1970
  - 14 September – Ulster and BBC1 begin broadcasting a colour television service from the Divis transmitter.
- 1971
  - No events.
- 1972
  - No events.
- 1973
  - Spotlight, BBC Northern Ireland's weekly current affairs series, launches.
- 1974
  - No events.
- 1975
  - 1 December – The Limavady transmitting station starts broadcasting a colour service to the north west of Northern Ireland, with additional coverage provided by the Londonderry transmitter, it meant BBC1, BBC2 and Ulster Television in colour was now available in the North West.
- 1976
  - No events.
- 1977
  - July – Colour broadcasting begins from the Strabane transmitter, with the addition of the two BBC channels provided from the transmitter for the first time meaning BBC1, BBC2 and Ulster Television would now be transmitted in colour.
- 1978
  - July – Colour broadcasting from the Brougher Mountain transmitter begins, with the addition of the two BBC channels provided from the transmitter for the first time meaning BBC1, BBC2 and Ulster Television would now be transmitted in colour.
- 1979
  - Good Evening Ulster replaces UTV Reports as Ulster's regional news programme. It becomes the UK's first hour-long regional news programme.
  - 10 August – The ten week ITV strike forces Ulster Television off the air. The strike ends on 24 October.

== 1980s ==
- 1980
  - 28 December – The IBA announces the results of the 1980 franchise round, revealing that Ulster Television has retained its franchise.
- 1981
  - No events.
- 1982
  - Ulster restores all-day broadcasting hours. For the last few years it had broadcast reduced hours, not coming on air until 12pm during the week when no schools programmes were being broadcast, and closing down every evening at 11:30pm.
- 1983
  - 17 January – Breakfast Time, Britain's first breakfast show, launches on BBC1. The new service includes four opt-outs which allow BBC Northern Ireland to broadcast its own news bulletin.
  - 1 February – ITV’s breakfast television service TV-am launches. It is a UK-wide service and therefore contains no Northern Irish-specific content. Consequently, Ulster's broadcast day now begins at 9:25am.
- 1984
  - 3 September – Scene Around Six is relaunched as Inside Ulster.
- 1985
  - 3 January – The last day of transmission using the 405-lines system.
  - 7 May – Inside Ulster is moved to an earlier timeslot of 5:35pm.
- 1986
  - No events.
- 1987
  - No events.
- 1988
  - 3 October – Ulster begins 24-hour broadcasting. They had planned to commence 24-hour transmissions a month earlier but it was delayed because of a last minute decision to take the overnight service provided by Granada, rather than that provided by Central.
- 1989
  - No events.

== 1990s ==
- 1990
  - No events.
- 1991
  - 16 October – Ulster retains its licence. There were three applicants for the licence and the other two had tabled higher bids. However, Television Northern Ireland (TVNI) was rejected because of its business plan and Lagan Television failed to meet the quality threshold.
- 1992
  - No events.
- 1993
  - 4 January – Ulster's news service is renamed UTV Live. The programme is broadcast for 60 minutes, instead of 30.
  - 4 June
    - At 6pm, Ulster Television changes its on-air name to UTV, although since the start of 1993, continuity announcements and trailers increasingly referred to the channel as "UTV". It also drops ITV network promotions and introduces locally produced trails.
    - Ulster's extended studios at Havelock House are formally opened by former UTV newsreader Gloria Hunniford.
- 1994
  - No events.
- 1995
  - No events.
- 1996
  - 12 February – BBC Northern Ireland's news programme is relaunched as BBC Newsline and the main teatime programme returns to its 6:30pm timeslot. Although Noel Thompson
  - BBC Northern Ireland launches a weekly political magazine called Hearts and Minds.
- 1997
  - No events.
- 1998
  - 10 April – The leading progress in Northern Ireland after overnight talks as the final draft of a Good Friday Agreement is almost ready for signature. At about 5:30pm, BBC Two dropped its scheduled programmes in the late afternoon to cover developments picking up in the middle of a joint press conference at Castle Buildings in Stormont Estate by the prime ministers Tony Blair and Bertie Ahern.
  - 23 September – Ahead of the launch of digital television, BBC Choice launches, and this features a weeknight output for Northern Ireland.
  - 15 November – The public launch of digital terrestrial television in the United Kingdom takes place.
- 1999
  - C9TV (Channel 9 Television) launches as a local television station channel in Derry.
  - 8 March – Following the introduction of the ITV Evening News, UTV Live is brought forward by half an hour to start at 5:30pm. The first half-hour sees feature reports, light-hearted stories and the weather forecast branded as part of a separate programme, UTV Life, which airs before the main evening news, which is rebranded as UTV Live at Six.
  - 28 June – Ulster launches a second television channel, TV You. It is available only to viewers of digital terrestrial and NTL cable.

== 2000s ==
- 2000
  - TV You is rebranded as UTV2.
- 2001
  - 30 March – BBC Choice Northern Ireland closes when the regional opt-outs on BBC Two launched on digital services.
  - 11 August – ITV's main channel is rebranded ITV1.
- 2002
  - 22 January – UTV2 closes following a deal with ITV Digital to replace UTV2 with ITV2.
  - UTV Live and UTV Life are merged into a single hour-long programme, running from 5:30pm.
- 2003
  - No events.
- 2004
  - 9 February – Belfast local channel NVTV starts broadcasting.
- 2005
  - No events.
- 2006
  - No events.
- 2007
  - February – UTV Live and UTV Life are split into separate programmes once again and all bulletins outside of the main early evening programme are retitled UTV News. This continues until April 2009.
  - C9TV stops all new programme production with much of the station's transmission time now consisting of simulcasts of Sky News.
- 2008
  - No events.
- 2009
  - February – Mid-morning weekday and lunchtime weekend UTV Live bulletins are axed when the station is permitted to reduce their weekly news output from five hours and twenty minutes to four hours.
  - 6 February – Cost-cutting measures and a reduction in regional programming at UTV result in the end of UTV Life.
  - 27 April – UTV launches a 30-minute late evening news and current affairs programme, UTV Live Tonight, which follows the News at Ten on Monday to Thursday nights and incorporates the station's late news bulletin alongside extended political and business coverage.
  - C9TV stops broadcasting after ten years on air.

== 2010s ==
- 2010
  - 5 October – UTV HD launches, but only on Virgin Media.
- 2011
  - 11 January – At 8pm, UTV +1 launches.
- 2012
  - 21 June – The final edition of BBC Northern Ireland's political magazine Hearts and Minds is broadcast. It is replaced in September by a new political programme called The View.
  - October – Belfast local channel NVTV stops broadcasting ahead of digital switchover but it continues to stream its programming online.
  - 23 October – At just after 11:30pm, Digital switchover is completed in the UK when analogue television signals in Northern Ireland are switched off.
  - 24 October – BBC One Northern Ireland and UTV begin high definition broadcasts on Freeview.
- 2013
  - 4 November – UTV HD launches on Sky and Freesat.
- 2014
  - 29 September – NVTV is relaunched following the channel being awarded a 12-year local TV licence by Ofcom.
- 2015
  - 19 October – UTV Media announces that it will sell its ITV franchise and the UTV brand to ITV plc for £100 million, subject to regulatory approval. The sale is completed on 29 February 2016.
- 2016
  - January – UTV Lifereturns as a weekly 30-minute Friday night programme, airing after the late UTV Live bulletin and presented by Pamela Ballantine.
  - 29 September – The 30-minute long UTV Live Tonight is axed and is replaced by a shorter ten-minute bulletin and a Monday night hour-long current affairs programme called View from Stormont. September also sees UTV Life returning to a weekly primetime slot at 8pm.
  - 16 October – At 11:15pm, the last live in-vision announcement on UTV is made ahead of the launch the following day of a brand new look which sees an alignment of the UTV brand more closely with that of the ITV network.
- 2017
  - No events.
- 2018
  - 1 July – ITV closes UTV's Havelock House studios and UTV begins broadcasting from a new broadcast centre at City Quays 2 in the Belfast Harbour Estate.
  - 29 November – BBC Two Northern Ireland starts broadcasting in HD.
- 2019
  - No events.

== 2020s ==
- 2020
  - 2 April – UTV begins broadcasting full ITV branding and presentation from London including network announcements, idents, promos and end credit sequences, initially as a temporary measure due to the impact of the COVID-19 pandemic on staff at the Belfast studios. This officially became permanent in November with the departures of the announcing team from the station.
  - 26 November – Local continuity on UTV is officially abandoned with the departures of the announcing team.
- 2021
  - No events.
- 2022
  - 15 November – ITV reverts its flagship channel's name back to ITV1 in all ITV plc-owned regions, and the UTV name continues to be used for local programming and in on-air promotions for local non-news programmes.
- 2023
  - No events.

== See also ==
- Timeline of Ulster Television
