= Timeline of Ulster Television =

This is a timeline of the history of Ulster Television (now known as UTV). It provides the ITV network service for Northern Ireland.

== 1950s ==
- 1958
  - September – Five years after television came to Northern Ireland, The Independent Television Authority, advertises the franchise for Northern Ireland. Two consortia apply and the ITA persuades the applicants to merge their bids to obtain the new franchise, on the provision that a greater stake of investment in the station was offered to Catholic sources.
- 1959
  - 31 October – Ulster Television launches at 4:45pm. However, only one main transmitter, Black Mountain, is operational meaning that coverage is not widespread, especially in western areas.

== 1960s ==
- 1960
  - No events.
- 1961
  - No events.
- 1962
  - Ulster opens a second studio at its Havelock House, Belfast base.
- 1963
  - 18 February – The Strabane transmitter opens, bringing coverage to the west of Northern Ireland for the first time.
- 1964
  - Newsview replaces Roundabout as Ulster's regional news programme.
  - Ulster is given a three-year extension to its licence. This is later extended by a further year.
- 1965
  - No events.
- 1966
  - No events.
- 1967
  - The Independent Television Authority renews Ulster's licence for a further seven years.
- 1968
  - 3 August – A technicians strike forces ITV off the air for several weeks although management manage to launch a temporary ITV Emergency National Service with no regional variations. The strike ends on 18 August.
  - 14 September – The final edition of Ulster Television's listings magazine TV Post is published. Listings are subsequently carried in an Ulster edition of TVTimes which became a national publication on 21 September.
- 1969
  - UTV Reports replaces Roundabout as Ulster's regional news programme.

== 1970s ==
- 1970
  - 14 September – Ulster launches a colour television service, but only from the Divis transmitter. To mark the change, the logo is redesigned.
- 1971
  - The music used as part of the station's daily start-up routine is changed when The Antrim Road, a classical symphony composed by Wayne Hill and Earl Ward, replaced Seamus, written by the American musician, composer and bandleader Van Phillips, which had been used since the station's launch.
- 1972
  - 16 October – Following a law change which removed all restrictions on broadcasting hours, ITV is able to launch an afternoon service.
- 1973
  - No events.
- 1974
  - The 1974 franchise round sees no changes in ITV's contractors as it is felt that the huge cost in switching to colour television would have made the companies unable to compete against rivals in a franchise battle.
- 1975
  - 1 December – The Limavady transmitting station starts broadcasting a colour service to the north west of Northern Ireland, with additional coverage provided by the Londonderry transmitter. Consequently, colour broadcasts from Ulster Television are now available in the North West.
- 1976
  - No events.
- 1977
  - No events.
- 1978
  - Ulster starts broadcasting in colour from the Brougher Mountain transmitter.
- 1979
  - Good Evening Ulster replaces UTV Reports as Ulster's regional news programme. It becomes the UK's first hour-long regional news programme.
  - 10 August – The ten-week ITV strike forces Ulster Television off the air. The strike ends on 24 October.

== 1980s ==
- 1980
  - 31 October – To celebrate its 21st anniversary, Ulster commissions a new ident featuring a model of the station logo embedded on four faces of a cube, coated in silver with a pole skewering the top and bottom of the cube. The logo is nicknamed "The Lollipop".
- 1981
  - No events.
- 1982
  - Ulster restores all-day broadcasting hours. For the last few years, it had broadcast reduced hours, not coming on air until 12pm during the week when no schools programmes were being broadcast and closing down every evening at 11:30pm.
- 1983
  - 1 February – ITV's breakfast television service TV-am launches. It is a UK-wide service and therefore contains no Northern Irish-specific content. Consequently, Ulster's broadcast day now begins at 9:25am.
- 1984
  - No events.
- 1985
  - 3 January – Ulster's last day of transmission using the 405-lines system.
- 1986
  - No events.
- 1987
  - 7 September
    - To coincide with the launch of the station's evening magazine programme, Six Tonight, a new ident was used to introduce it, featuring a computer-animated silver station logo on a blue/green backdrop.
    - Following the transfer of ITV Schools to Channel 4, ITV provides a full morning programme schedule, with advertising, for the first time. The new service includes regular five-minute national and regional news bulletins.
- 1988
  - 3 October – Ulster begins 24-hour broadcasting. They had planned to commence 24-hour transmissions a month earlier but a last minute decision to take the overnight service provided by Granada, rather than that provided by Central, caused the delay.
- 1989
  - 1 January – A revised ident is introduced and is the last to feature the logo first seen in 1970.

== 1990s ==
- 1990
  - No events.
- 1991
  - 16 October – Ulster retains its licence. There were three applicants for the licence and the other two had tabled higher bids. However, Television Northern Ireland (TVNI) was rejected because of its business plan and Lagan Television failed to meet the quality threshold.
- 1992
  - No events.
- 1993
  - 4 January – Ulster's news service is renamed UTV Live. The programme broadcasts for 60 minutes, instead of 30.
  - 4 June
    - At 6pm, UTV unveils a new logo to coincide with the station now being known as UTV. Since the start of 1993, continuity announcements and trailers increasingly referred to the channel as "UTV". It also drops ITV network promotions and introduces locally produced trails.
    - Ulster's extended studios at Havelock House are formally opened by former UTV newsreader Gloria Hunniford.
- 1994
  - No events.
- 1995
  - No events.
- 1996
  - 11 November – UTV introduces a new series of idents which showcase scenic locations in Northern Ireland. These include the Giant's Causeway, a waterfall at Glenarriff, and Portaferry harbour. Some of the idents also featured UTV personalities.
- 1997
  - No events.
- 1998
  - 12 January – The 1996 logos are supplemented with a set of idents featuring people playing the UTV jingle on various musical instruments.
  - 15 November – The public launch of digital terrestrial television in the United Kingdom takes place.
- 1999
  - 8 March – Following the introduction of the ITV Evening News, UTV Live is brought forward by half an hour to start at 5:30pm. The first half-hour sees feature reports, light-hearted stories and the weather forecast branded as part of a separate programme, UTV Life, which airs before the main evening news which starts at 6pm and is branded as UTV Live at Six.
  - 28 June – UTV launches a second television channel, TV You. It is available only to viewers of digital terrestrial and NTL cable.

== 2000s ==
- 2000
  - TV You is rebranded as UTV2.
- 2001
  - 11 August – ITV's main channel is rebranded ITV1.
- 2002
  - 22 January – UTV2 closes following a deal with ITV Digital to replace it with ITV2.
  - UTV Live and UTV Life are merged into a single hour-long programme, running from 5:30pm.
  - 28 October – UTV adopts the new celebrity idents from ITV1. However, these were gradually replaced with local versions featuring notable personalities and broadcasters from Northern Ireland.
- 2003
  - 20 November – UTV replaces its network-inspired graphics with a series landscape films of Northern Ireland in their idents, in the form of a panorama shot as the camera revolved around a location.
- 2004
  - No events.
- 2005
  - 16 December – After more than 16 years on air, the final edition of UTV's regional talk and variety show Kelly is broadcast. At around the same time, UTV axes the rest of its local entertainment programming as part of cutbacks to the station's local output.
- 2006
  - 16 January – To coincide with the introduction of a new identity across ITV plc stations, UTV replaces its 2003 idents with a brand new set. The new idents featured newly recorded films shot across Northern Ireland, again in the form of panoramas. The landscape films used in these idents are updated in July 2007 and October 2008.
  - 26 May – The registered company name is changed from 'Ulster Television plc' to 'UTV plc'. The company believed that the existing name no longer reflected the full scope of the company's business.
- 2007
  - February – UTV Live and UTV Life are split into separate programmes once again and all bulletins outside of the main early evening programme are retitled UTV News. This continues until April 2009.
- 2008
  - No events.
- 2009
  - February – Mid-morning weekday and weekend lunchtime UTV Live bulletins are axed when the station is permitted to reduce their weekly news output from five hours and twenty minutes to four hours.
  - 6 February – Cost-cutting measures and a reduction in regional programming at the station result in the end of UTV Life.
  - 27 April – UTV launches a 30-minute late evening news and current affairs programme, UTV Live Tonight, which follows the News at Ten on Monday to Thursday nights and incorporates the station's late news bulletin alongside extended political and business coverage.
  - Having scaled back in-vision continunity on weekend evenings in recent years, UTV reintroduces it full-time in that slot.

== 2010s ==
- 2010
  - 5 October – UTV HD launches, but only on Virgin Media.
- 2011
  - 11 January – At 8pm, UTV +1 launches.
- 2012
  - 12 October – UTV launches a new set of idents.
  - 23 October – At just after 11:30pm, Digital switchover is completed in the UK when analogue television signals in Northern Ireland are switched off.
  - 24 October – UTV HD launches on Freeview.
- 2013
  - 4 November – UTV HD launches on Sky and Freesat.
- 2014
  - No events.
- 2015
  - 1 January – UTV Ireland is launched and four days later, a news and current affairs programme for the channel, Ireland Live launches, broadcasting a half-hour early evening newscast and an hour-long programme at 10pm, also produces local news updates during UTV Ireland's simulcasts of Good Morning Britain.
  - 14 May – UTV Ireland begins broadcasting hourly Ireland Live news updates throughout the day.
  - 19 October – UTV Media announces that it will sell its ITV franchise and the UTV brand to ITV plc for £100 million, subject to regulatory approval. The sale is completed on 29 February 2016.
- 2016
  - January – UTV Life returns as a weekly 30-minute Friday night programme, airing after the late UTV Live bulletin and presented by Pamela Ballantine.
  - 11 July – ITV plc sells UTV Ireland to Virgin Media Ireland for €10 million.
  - 29 September – The 30-minute long UTV Live Tonight is axed and replaced by a shorter ten-minute bulletin and a Monday night hour-long current affairs programme called View from Stormont. September also sees UTV Life returning to a weekly primetime slot at 8pm.
  - 16 October – At 11:15pm, the last live in-vision announcement is made ahead of the launch the following day of a brand new look which sees an alignment of the UTV brand more closely with that of the ITV network.
- 2017
  - 9 January – UTV Ireland is closed and is replaced by a substantially new channel called Be3, focussing on children's and female-orientated programming. The closure also sees the ending after two years of UTV-produced news and current affairs programme for the channel, Ireland Live.
- 2018
  - 1 July – ITV closes UTV's Havelock House studios and UTV begins broadcasting from a new broadcast centre at City Quays 2 in the Belfast Harbour Estate.
- 2019
  - No events.

== 2020s ==
- 2020
  - 2 April – UTV begins broadcasting full ITV branding and presentation from London including network announcements, idents, promos and end credit sequences, initially as a temporary measure due to the impact of the COVID-19 pandemic on staff at the Belfast studios. This became officially permanent in November with the departures of the announcing team from the station.
  - 26 November – Local continuity is officially abandoned with the departures of the announcing team.
- 2021
  - 25 April – A local voice-over is reinstated to introduce some local programmes. A new bumper with the UTV logo and the tagline "Part of ITV" is also shown for a short time before some – but not all – commercial breaks.
- 2022
  - 15 November – ITV reverts its flagship channel's name back to ITV1 in all ITV plc-owned regions, and the UTV name continues to be used for local programming and in on-air promotions for local non-news programmes.

== See also ==
- History of ITV
- History of ITV television idents
- Timeline of ITV
- Timeline of television in Northern Ireland
- Timeline of commercial television in the Republic of Ireland
