= List of tallest structures in Ireland =

This is a list of the tallest structures on the island of Ireland.

Those in Northern Ireland are denoted by a light blue background, the rest are in the Republic of Ireland.

== Tallest churches ==
Rank	Name	Location	County	Type	Year completed	Height	Picture
1	St Colman's Cathedral	Cobh	Cork	cathedral	1914	91.4 m (300 ft)	
2	St Macartan's Cathedral	Monaghan	Monaghan	cathedral	1893	88 m (289 ft)	
3	St Mary's Cathedral	Killarney	Kerry	cathedral	1912	86.8 m (285 ft)	
4	St Patrick's College Church	Maynooth	Kildare	church	1891	83 m (272 ft)	
5	St John's Cathedral	Limerick	Limerick	cathedral	1861	81 m (266 ft)	
6	St Anne's Cathedral	Belfast	Antrim	cathedral	1904	80 m (260 ft)	
7	St Eugene's Cathedral	Derry	Londonderry	cathedral	1903	78 m (256 ft)	
8	St Finbarre's Cathedral	Cork	Cork	cathedral	1879	73 m (240 ft)	
9	St Eunan's Cathedral	Letterkenny	Donegal	cathedral	1900	73 m (240 ft)	
10	Cathedral of Saint Patrick and Saint Felim	Cavan	Cavan	cathedral	1942	70 m (230 ft)	
11	St Peter and St Paul Cathedral	Ennis	Clare	cathedral	1874	69 m (226 ft)	
12	Sacred Heart Church	Omagh	Tyrone	church	1899	68.6 m (225 ft)	
13	Church of Saints Augustine and John	Dublin	Dublin	church	1874	68 m (223 ft)	
14	St. Peter's Roman Catholic Church, Drogheda	Drogheda	Louth	church	1884	67.66 m (222.0 ft)	
15=	St Columb's Cathedral	Derry	Londonderry	cathedral	1633	67 m (220 ft)	
16	St Patrick's Cathedral (Church of Ireland)	Dublin	Dublin	cathedral	1191	66 m (217 ft)	
17	St Patrick's Cathedral (Roman Catholic)	Armagh	Armagh	cathedral	1904	64 m (210 ft)	
18	St Patrick's Church, Belfast	Belfast	Antrim	church	1877	63 m (207 ft)	
19	St George's Church	Dublin	Dublin	church	1813	61 m (200 ft)	
20	St Mary of the Rosary Church	Nenagh	Tipperary	church	1906	60.7 m (199 ft)	
21	St. Marys Church of Ireland	Carlow	Carlow	church	1834	59.5 m (195 ft)	

== Tallest structures ==
Rank	Name	Location	County	Year completed	Pinnacle height	Pinnacle height	Type	Coordinates	Remarks
1	Strabane transmitting station	Legfordrum (near Strabane)	Tyrone	1963	305.5 m	1,002 ft	Guyed mast	54°47′58″N 7°23′19″W	
2	Black Mountain transmitting station	Hannahstown	Antrim	1959	228.6 m	750 ft	Guyed mast	54°35′13″N 6°01′20″W	
3	Mullaghanish transmitter	Mullaghanish mountain	Cork	1962	225 m	738 ft	Guyed mast	51°59′00.2″N 9°08′39.1″W	
4	Moneypoint Power Station Chimneys	Moneypoint	Clare	1985	218 m	715 ft	Chimney	52°36′29.16″N 9°25′31.85″W ; 52°36′27.68″N 9°25′24.7″W	
5	Poolbeg power station, Chimney 2	Poolbeg	Dublin	1978	207.8 m	682 ft	Chimney	53°20′24.84″N 6°11′19.38″W)	
6	Poolbeg power station, Chimney 1	Poolbeg	Dublin	1970	207.48 m	681 ft	Chimney	53°20′24.82″N 6°11′23.79″W	
7	Kilroot power station chimney	Kilroot (near Carrickfergus)	Antrim	1981	198 m	650 ft	Chimney	54°43′28.25″N 5°46′2.15″W	
8	Drumlins Park Wind Farm	Newbliss	Monaghan	2024	180 m	590 ft	wind turbine	54°7′48″N 7°09′25″W	
9	Liffey meats wind turbine	Ballyjamesduff	Cavan	2017	169 m	554 ft	wind turbine	53°51′05.6″N 7°12′17.8″W	
10	Truskmore transmitter	Sligo	Sligo	1962	167.64 m	550 ft	Guyed mast	54°22′22.57″N 8°22′15.32″W	
11	Divis transmitting station	Hannahstown	Antrim	1955 (replaced and made taller in 2011)	166 m	545 ft	stayed mast	53°36′27″N 6°00′34″W	Was 141.7 m but replaced in 2011 Note these are a pair of twin masts.
12	Three Rock transmitter	Dublin	Dublin	2002	152.4 m	500 ft	Guyed mast	53°14′39.98″N 6°14′17.33″W	
13	Aghada Power Station Chimney	Cork	Cork	?	152 m	499 ft	Chimney	51°50′6.05″N 8°14′9.41″W	
14	Tarbert Power Station, Chimney of Unit 3 and 4	Tarbert	Kerry	1975	151 m	497 ft	Chimney	52°35′24″N 9°21′46″W	
15	Lisnagarvey transmitting station	Magherageery (near Lisburn)	Down	1936	145 m	476 ft	Guyed mast	54°29′22″N 6°3′37″W	It was 145 m when built, but has since been lowered in height to 99m
16	Greystones Wind farm	Greystones	Wicklow	?	139.29 m	457 ft	Wind turbines	53°10′18.10″N 6°01′30.00″W	
17	Great Island Power Station Chimney	Wexford	Wexford	?	138 m	453 ft	Chimney	52°16′43.82″N 6°59′37.76″W ; 52°16′43.71″N 6°59′35.95″W	
18	Kippure transmitter	Kippure mountain	border of Dublin and Wicklow	1961	127 m	416 ft	Guyed mast	53°10′40.93″N 6°19′53.82″W ||	
19	Ballylumford Power Station Chimneys	Islandmagee	Antrim	1974	126 m	413 ft	Chimney	54.845 n5.787w	
20	Kinnegad Cement Factory Chimney	Killaskillen (close to Kinnegad)	Meath	?	125.3 m	411 ft	Chimney	53°25′52.84″N 7°08′33.78″W	
20	Arklow Bank Wind Park	Wicklow	Wicklow	?	124 m	407 ft	Wind turbines	52°47′28.00″N 5°56′48.00″W	Offshore wind farm
21	Mount Leinster transmitter	Mount Leinster	border of Carlow and Wexford	?	122 m	400 ft	Guyed mast	52°36′59″N 6°46′30″W	
22	Maghera transmitter	Maghera	Clare	?	121.92 m	400 ft	Guyed mast	52°58′6.9″N 8°43′6.89″W	
23	Cairn Hill transmitter	Cairn Hill	Longford	?	121.92 m	400 ft	Guyed mast	53°48′28″N 7°42′52″W	
24	Tarbert Power Station, Chimney of Unit 1 and 2	Tarbert	Kerry	1969	121 m	397 ft	Chimney	52°35′24″N 9°21′46″W	
25	Kilgarvan Wind farm	Kilgarvan	Kerry	?	120 m	394 ft	Wind turbines	51°55′58.80″N 9°19′20.95″W	
26	Spire of Dublin	Dublin	Dublin	2003	120 m	394 ft	Monument	53°20′59″N 6°15′37″W)	
27	Donnybrook Mast	RTÉ campus	Dublin	1961	109.7 m	360 ft	Lattice tower	53°18′53.13″N 6°13′24.88″W	
28	Moanvaun Wind farm	Tipperary	Tipperary	?	107.3 m	352 ft	Wind turbines	52°38′44.80″N 8°08′54.44″W	
29	Aughinish Alumina Plant Chimney	Limerick	Limerick	?	107 m	351 ft	Chimney	52°37′53.64″N 9°03′32.37″W	
30	Kiln of Limerick Cement Factory	Limerick	Limerick	?	107 m	351 ft	Chimney	52°38′33.92″N 8°41′23.72″W	
31	Samson, Harland and Wolff	Belfast	Antrim	1974	106 m	348 ft	Crane	54°36′29″N 5°54′29″W	
32	Kiln of Platin Cement Factory	Platin (close to Drogheda)	Meath	?	103.9 m	341 ft	Klin	53°41′6.58″N 6°23′19.85″W	
33	Ballywater Wind Farm	Wexford	Wexford	?	103 m	338 ft	Wind turbines	52°32′25.92″N 6°13′40.29″W	
34	Athlone transmitter	Athlone	Westmeath	1933	100 m	328 ft	Guyed Mast	53°25′14.14″N 7°52′45.87″W ; 53°25′14.09″N 7°52′58.43″W	Two guyed masts insulated against ground carried a T-antenna for broadcasting on 612 kHz. One of the two masts dismantled in 2011
35	Codling Banks Mast	Wicklow	Wicklow	?	100 m	328 ft	Guyed Mast	53°07′44.87″N 5°50′49.54″W	Offshore structure
36	Coreen Wind farm	Cavan	Cavan	?	100 m	328 ft	Wind turbines	54°08′32.27″N 7°38′38.60″W	
37	Snugborough Wind farm	Cavan	Cavan	?	100 m	328 ft	Wind turbines	54°08′21.27″N 7°36′38.14″W	
38	Gartnaneane Wind farm	Cavan	Cavan	?	100 m	328 ft	Wind turbines	53°56′43.67″N 6°56′08.24″W	
39	Coomatallin Wind farm	Cork	Cork	?	100 m	328 ft	Wind turbines	51°39′03.62″N 9°5′38.87″W	
40	Meentycat Wind farm	Cork	Cork	?	100 m	328 ft	Wind turbines	54°51′46.19″N 7°51′12.62″W	
41	Beal Wind farm	Kerry	Kerry	?	100 m	328 ft	Wind turbines	52°33′47.33″N 9°37′55.73″W	
42	Beam Wind farm	?	Donegal	?	99 m	325 ft	Wind turbines	55°11′51.98″N 7°26′16.32″W	
43	Goliath, Harland and Wolff	Belfast	Antrim	1969	96 m	315 ft	Crane	54°36′29″N 5°54′29″W	
44	Mount Eagle Wind farm	Donegal	Donegal	?	95.7 m	314 ft	Wind turbines	52°14′33.15″N 9°19′26.22″W	
45	Mweelin TV Mast	Achill Island	Mayo	?	91.44 m	300 ft	Guyed mast	53°57′19″N 10°1′42.45″W	
46	Dún Laoghaire Cranes	Dublin	Dublin	?	91.4 m	300 ft	Crane	53°17′40.87″N 6°7′53.73″W	
47	Bealadangan Radio Mast	Galway	Galway	?	91.4 m	300 ft	Partially guyed tower	53°18′36.84″N 9°36′30.23″W	Was used for RTÉ RnaG, now dismantled
48	Cark Wind farm	Donegal	Donegal	?	91.1 m	299 ft	Wind turbines	54°53′06.20″N 7°51′33.12″W	
49	Greenoge Wind farm	Wexford	Wexford	?	90.2 m	296 ft	Wind turbines	52°39′28.23″N 6°43′31.69″W	
50	Dublin Airport ATC Tower	Collinstown	Dublin	2019	86.9 m	285 ft	Air traffic control tower	53°25′44.3″N 6°15′50.8″W	

== Other categories ==
Entries in the list that are in Northern Ireland are denoted by an asterisk, the others being in the Republic of Ireland.

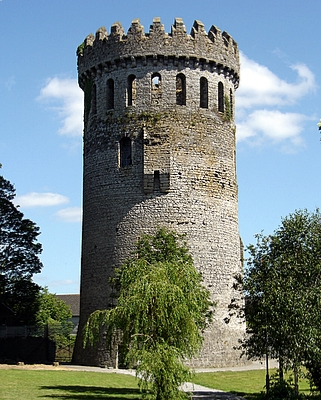
Nenagh Castle Keep

Sculptures
Spire of Dublin, 120 m (390 ft)
Spire of Hope, St Anne's Cathedral, Belfast*, 40 m (130 ft)
Gantry Cranes
"Samson", Harland and Wolff, Belfast*, 106 m (348 ft)
Bridges
River Suir Bridge, Waterford, 112 m (367 ft)
Boyne River Bridge, 95 m (312 ft)
Windmills
Kilgarvan Wind Farm (group of 14 wind turbines), 93 m (305 ft)
Obelisks
Wellington Monument, Phoenix Park, 62 m (203 ft) (Tallest in Europe)
Lighthouses
Fastnet Rock Lighthouse, 54 m (177 ft)
Stadiums
Croke Park, 35 m (115 ft)
Air traffic control towers
Dublin Airport ATC Tower, 87 m (285 ft)
Moving sculptures
Irish Wave, Park West, Dublin, 35.4 m (116 ft) (Tallest in Europe)
Round towers
Kilmacduagh monastery, 32.5 m (107 ft)
Castles
Nenagh Castle Keep, 31 m (102 ft)
Standing stones
Punchestown, 6.5 m (21 ft)
High crosses
Muiredach's High Cross, Monasterboice, 5.8 m (19 ft)

== Former ==
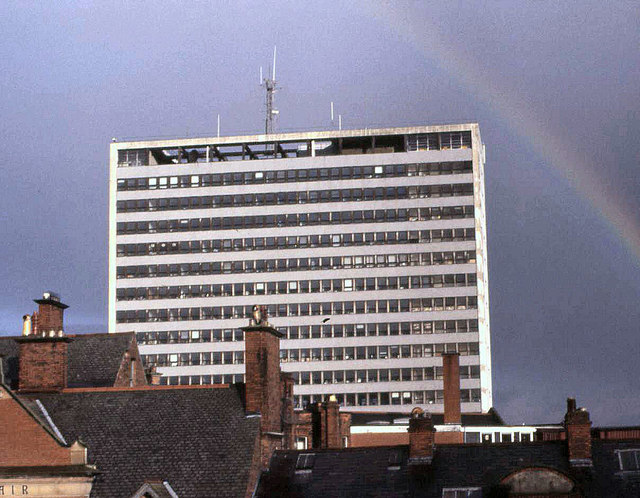
Former Churchill House, Belfast

- Cork mediumwave transmitter, 121.92 m (400 ft) guyed mast formerly located at 51°52′57.05″N 8°23′58.46″W, used for broadcasting on 729 kHz until 2008, dismantled in August 2024.
- Tullamore transmitter, 290 m (952 ft), demolished 2023
- Clarkstown radio transmitter, 248 m (814 ft) demolished 2023
- Bellacorick Cooling Tower, 89 m (290 ft), demolished 2007
- Arrol Gantry, 70 m (228 ft), demolished 1969
- Churchill House, Belfast, 66 m (215 ft), demolished 2004
- Boyne Obelisk, 53 m (174 ft), destroyed 1923
- National Grain Silo, 52 m (170 ft), demolished 2008
- Ballymun Flats, 42 m (136 ft), demolished 2004–2015
- Nelson's Pillar Monument, 41 m (134 ft), destroyed 1966

== See also ==
- List of tallest buildings in Ireland
- List of tallest buildings and structures in Belfast
- List of tallest buildings and structures in Dublin

== Other sources ==
- Tallest structures in Ireland
- Galloway, Peter; Cormac Simms (1992). The Cathedrals of Ireland. Dublin: Institute of Irish Studies. ISBN 0-85389-452-3.
- "Punchestown Standing Stone Standing Stone / Menhir – The Modern Antiquarian.com". Themodernantiquarian.com. 14 January 2006.
- "Irish Wave". The Daily Telegraph. Archived from the original (XML) on 7 December 2003.
- "Diagrams". SkyscraperPage.com.
- "Dublin City Council". Dublincity.ie.
