= 96.4 FM =

FM radio frequency

This is a list of radio stations that broadcast on FM frequency 96.4 MHz:

== Australia ==
- Sounds of the Mountains 96.4 Tumut

== Belarus ==
- Radio Mahilyow

== Belgium ==
- Rtbf

== Bulgaria ==
- Horizont (Nikipol frequency)

== China (mainland) ==
- CNR The Voice of China in Qujing, Xi'an and Yinchuan
- Yunfu Traffic & Music Radio in Yunfu

== Czech Republic ==
- Hitradio Orion

== Germany ==
- WDR 2 (Höxter frequency)

== Greece ==
- Metropolis FM

== Hong Kong ==
- RTHK Radio 2 (Castle Peak frequency)

== Hungary ==
- 96.4 ROXY Radio

== Ireland ==
- Clare FM
- South East Radio

== Kosovo ==
- Radio Rinia

== Malaysia ==
- Sinar in North Perak, Padang Rengas Kuala Kangsar and Central Perak

== Malta ==
- Energy FM

== Monaco ==
- Fréquence JAZZ (French station)

== New Zealand ==
- Coast (Taranaki frequency)
- Classic Hits Forestland
- Radio Southland

== Russia ==
- X-FM

== Sierra Leone ==
- Radio Bontico

== United Kingdom ==
- Hits Radio Birmingham (in Birmingham and the West Midlands)
- Greatest Hits Radio Cumbria & South West Scotland (Carlisle frequency)
- Greatest Hits Radio Grimsby (in Grimsby)
- Downtown Radio (Limavady frequency)
- Greatest Hits Radio Surrey & North East Hampshire (Guildford frequency)
- Heart East (in Kings Lynn)
- Heart West (in Torbay and Torquay)
- KMFM Shepway and White Cliffs Country (Shepway frequency)
- Heart North East (Hexham frequency)
- Greatest Hits Radio Staffordshire & Cheshire (Cheshire frequency)
- Tay FM (Perth frequency)
- Hits Radio South Wales in Swansea and South West Wales
