= Gerry Kelly (broadcaster) =

Northern Irish broadcaster and journalist (1948–2026)

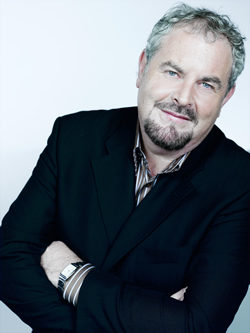
- Born: 20 September 1948; Ballymena, Northern Ireland
- Died: 26 July 2026 (aged 77); Coney Island, County Down, Northern Ireland
- Occupations: Broadcaster and journalist
- Years active: 1977–2024
- Known for: Kelly
- Spouse: Helena
- Children: 2

Gerard Kelly (20 September 1948 – 26 July 2026) was a Northern Irish broadcaster and journalist, best known for his presenting career at UTV, where he presented the Friday night talk and variety show Kelly from 1989 until 2005.

From April 2009 to December 2019, he worked at BBC Radio Ulster, presenting on Fridays and Saturdays.

== Early life ==
Gerard Kelly was born on 20 September 1948 on Thomas Street in Ballymena, Northern Ireland. His parents were originally from Derry, where his father worked in the shirt industry, and the family moved to Downpatrick in the early 1950s. Much of Kelly's childhood was overshadowed by his father's alcohol problem. In the early 1960s, his father left on the pretext of going to Scotland for work, and Kelly never heard from him again.

Before going into broadcasting and journalism, Kelly worked as a teacher and a lecturer at St. Mary's College in Belfast, and as a leisure development officer for Belfast City Council.

== Broadcasting career ==
Kelly's broadcasting career began at Ulster Television as a part-time Gaelic games reporter, but he left the station quickly after being blacklisted by the National Union of Journalists. After a year's work experience at the Down Recorder, he returned to UTV in 1979 as a reporter, and later presenter, of its evening magazine programme, Good Evening Ulster.

Kelly also presented the series Lifestyle, Kelly's People, Kelly on Tour, Kelly on the Road, What Next?, Get It Right Next Time, and Pick of the Six for Ulster Television. He also presented a radio show Kelly on the Radio on Downtown Radio.

In September 1989, he began presenting the popular talk and variety show, Kelly, which aired for 571 episodes. Notable guests included a 9-year-old Rory McIlroy, who appeared in 1999 after winning the world under 10s championship, and George Best, who appeared in a special edition in 2000. The Best episode was the highest-rated, with 367,000 viewers.

In May 1999, Kelly was among the names tipped to succeed Gay Byrne as the host of The Late Late Show on RTÉ One. The position ultimately went to Pat Kenny.

In September 2005, UTV announced that Kelly would end. Kelly said that UTV were unhappy with the show airing at 9:00 pm, as the slot required the station to opt out of ITV's network schedule. Rather than move the programme, UTV decided to axe it. The final episode aired on 16 December 2005.

After the cancellation of Kelly, a new series, Gerry Meets..., launched in March 2006. The series focused on one-to-one interviews. One 2006 episode, featuring Kelly's interview with Jimmy Savile, received widespread coverage six years later after the Savile sexual abuse scandal broke. Particular attention was paid to comments Savile made that were interpreted as clues to his history as a predatory sex offender.

In January 2008, it was reported that Kelly had left UTV. He told the Belfast Telegraph, "I'm leaving UTV on amicable terms and I have nothing but the highest regard for them. As far as I'm concerned, they gave me one of the best jobs in the world and I'm grateful to them for that."

In March 2009, it was announced that Kelly would join BBC Radio Ulster to present a Saturday afternoon programme, commencing in April. He began a Friday afternoon programme in 2014. He left the Friday role in October 2019 and continued with the Saturday show until later that year.

In November 2023, it was announced that Kelly would present a new series, Conversations with Gerry Kelly. He said the programme would not rival RTÉ's The Late Late Show, despite speculation that both shows might air around the same time. In January 2024, it was confirmed that the ten‑part series would be broadcast on Monday nights from 29 January 2024 on Belfast‑based channel NVTV.

== Personal life and death ==
Kelly was married and had two daughters. He was a member of Ardglass Golf Club and lived in Coney Island, County Down. He was also the brother of former Down GAA goalkeeper Danny Kelly.

In February 2018, Kelly said he had been diagnosed with cancer two years earlier. He reported that the tumour had been successfully removed and that he had completed six chemotherapy sessions. Kelly died at his home on 26 July 2026, aged 77.

=== Tributes ===
Following Kelly's death, musician Peter Corry said he had been "a big champion of mine" and a good friend. Broadcaster Ralph McLean described Kelly as "a natural broadcaster". Deputy First Minister Emma Little‑Pengelly said he had been "a face and a voice" familiar to generations across Northern Ireland.

== Awards ==
In 1993, he received the Sony Gold Award for a special programme following the Shankill Road bombing. In 1998, Kelly was installed in the Royal Television Society Hall of Fame in recognition of his contribution to broadcasting. He also received two Entertainment and Media Awards.
