= Julian Simmons =

Northern Irish broadcaster (born 1952)

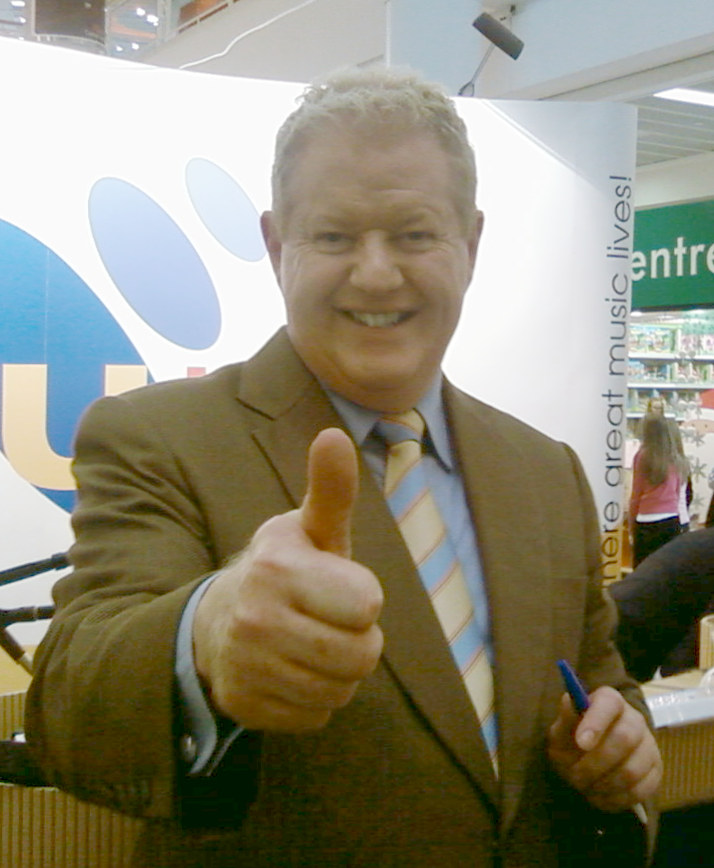
- Born: 27 March 1952 (age 74); Northern Ireland
- Occupations: Continuity announcer Television presenter Actor; Voice actor
- Years active: 1976–present
- Employer(s): UTV (1992–2020); Freelance (2020-Present)

Julian Lanus Simmons (born 27 March 1952) is a broadcaster from Northern Ireland, best known for his work as a long-serving continuity announcer on UTV.

== Early life ==
Simmons was born in Kent, England on 27 March 1952. His parents were Pearl and Alan, both from London. Simmons later moved with his parents to Northern Ireland when his father was moved there by his company Morley's. Simmons attended Belmont Primary School and Methodist College. Simmons had an interest in drama at a young age; he held puppet shows at his home. Before his broadcasting career began, Simmons worked for McCalla Travel, and later worked for Air Canada in Belfast and London between 1978 and 1997, combining this with his announcing work for UTV.

== Broadcasting career ==
Simmons' career in broadcasting began when he appeared in amateur drama productions in Belfast while working for Air Canada at their offices in the city. In Julian (a documentary produced for the Belfast community television station NVTV), he observed: "Somebody saw me in a Belfast comedy, and said that 'You should be on TV, I know somebody who you should speak to'. So I sent my letter in, and duly arrived up at Havelock House, with amateur tapes that I had made of comedy sketches that I was performing in my kitchen, and bathroom, and bedroom... and I presented those and they listened to them and said, 'Yes, those are quite funny, but there's no opening for that sort of thing here at the moment. Here's a news bulletin, let's hear you read that.'" Simmons was then offered a six-week trial as an announcer at Ulster Television.

When he started working at UTV, Simmons' job involved reading news and sports bulletins as well as introducing the channel's programmes, but he felt uneasy with newsreading. "I didn't know what I was talking about... My main worry when I was reading the news was...you are worried about making a mistake, but I was also worried I was going to laugh. I have this thing if I'm hearing bad news, or someone goes to tell me something grave... it must be a nervous thing, I feel myself starting to smirk. So I was always terrifed that when I was reading the news that I was going to laugh."

Initially working as a freelancer at the Havelock House studios in Belfast, Simmons joined the station's presentation department as a staffer in 1992, shortly before a major on-air rebrand from Ulster Television to UTV.

In the 2005 Julian documentary, Simmons describes how his continuity duties eventually changed: "Continuity was very straight... and then one Christmas, I was in for four or five days over the Christmas period, all done up like a dog's dinner and a dickie bow... no news to read, so I started introducing these programmes and acting 'a bit of the lig' in between the programmes. And it went down very well, apparently. They decided I would do permanently weekends: Friday/Saturday/Sunday primetime, where the programmes are all entertainment; nothing hard or heavy."

Between October 2006 and February 2009, Simmons appeared on UTV Live and UTV Life to talk about upcoming storylines on Coronation Street and Emmerdale, the two main soap operas shown on UTV. He has also presented the light-hearted archive series, UTV Rewind and the travel series Come Fly with Julian.

Up until October 2016, Simmons usually introduced programmes on the station in-vision at weekends and was mainly associated with his links into what he has described as his favourite programme, Coronation Street, where he puts on a 'camper' voice and refers to recent story developments on the programme. When talking about his Coronation Street introductions, he comments that he is "...imitating what I [hear] people say on trains and on buses... people talk about the soaps as if it's happening to real people."

His catchphrase, usually heard when introducing episodes of Coronation Street, was "But now on the UTV...". Between 2003 and 2015, Simmons also presented 'Santa Flash' announcements on Christmas Eve, where he gave his own account of Santa Claus' journey from the North Pole, traditionally stating that he was going to land in Ireland first.

Following the sale of UTV to ITV plc, Simmons made his last regular in-vision announcement at 11.15pm on Sunday 16 October 2016, coinciding with the transfer of UTV's presentation and playout facilities from Belfast to Chiswick. Simmons was retained as an out-of-vision announcer and a relief weather presenter.

In April 2020, UTV abandoned local continuity, initially as a temporary measure, due to the impact of the COVID-19 pandemic on staff at the station's Belfast studios. Following a decision to switch permanently to ITV network presentation, Simmons announced his departure from UTV on 26 November 2020.

At the time of his departure, Simmons was believed to be one of the longest-serving continuity announcers on any television channel in the UK and Ireland - and the longest-serving announcer on the ITV network.

== Other appearances ==
In addition to his presenting career at UTV, Simmons starred in the film Wild About Harry, playing the role of Michael Bay.

== Personal life ==
Simmons currently lives in Belfast. In an interview in 2008, Simmons announced that he was gay. In 2011, Simmons underwent surgery for a quadruple heart bypass. He returned to his announcing role at UTV on 3 November 2011 after a four-month break.
