= Brougher Mountain transmitting station =

Transmitter near Enniskillen, Northern Ireland

Brougher Mountain
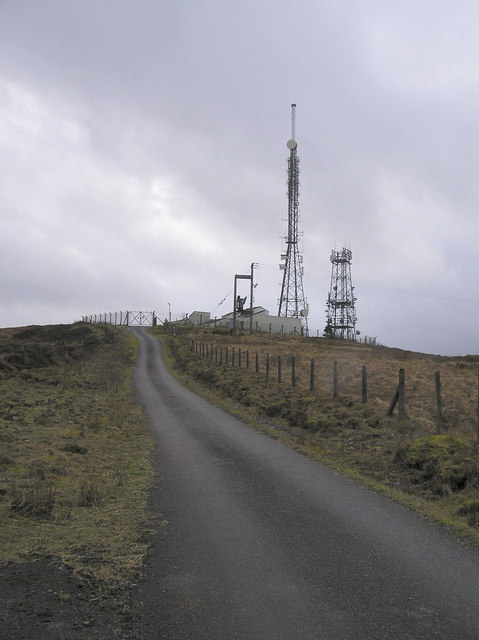
- Brougher Mountain transmitting station

- Location within Northern Ireland
- Tower height: 55 metres (180 ft)
- Coordinates: 54.42327°N 7.46043°W
- BBC region: BBC Northern Ireland
- ITV region: UTV

Brougher Mountain transmitting station is a major transmitting station in Northern Ireland. It is located between County Tyrone and County Fermanagh, on top of a 317 m (1,040 ft) high hill called Brougher Mountain. Despite being located in County Tyrone it is sometimes referred to as the "Enniskillen" or "Fermanagh" transmitter.

It has four other transmitter sites in its digital television transmitter group, at Ederny, Derrygonnelly, Belcoo, and Lisbellaw.

Brougher Mountain came into service on 24 February 1964, transmitting the BBC Television Service on VHF 405 lines channel B5.

The ITV service provided by Ulster Television launched from the Strabane transmitter located 40 miles north of Brougher Mountain on 18 February 1963 and its coverage extended down to the area covered by Brougher Mountain. prior to date the only television service available in many parts of its service area was from Telefís Éireann's Truskmore transmitter which opened in 1962.

It became the main UHF transmitter for the area in July 1978, when BBC One, BBC Two and UTV started transmitting in colour on the 625 line UHF service and was the last main transmitting station in the UK to be equipped for UHF. Channel 4 started transmitting from the transmitter in December 1983.

Due to its close proximity to the Republic of Ireland, since the transmitter went on air in 1964, many living in counties Cavan, Monaghan, Donegal, Leitrim, Roscommon and Sligo could receive the UK channels via spill-over signals from Brougher Mountain, as well as the Strabane transmitter.

During the mid-1980s Brougher Mountain was only one of three original BBC main FM transmitters in Northern Ireland affected by the frequency changes arising from the 1984 Geneva (FM) Frequency plan with all (then) three services moving up 0.5 MHz although across the border in the Republic of Ireland the RTE's FM transmitter network were more extensively affected.

The site was the location of a Provisional IRA bombing on 9 February 1971, which left 5 BBC workers dead when their vehicle was destroyed by a landmine. The workers were travelling up the mountain to repair the transmitter when the landmine, which was detonated by a tripwire, detonated. It has been suggested that the booby trap was in fact set to target members of the British Army, who regularly patrolled in the border area.

== Services transmitted by frequency ==
=== Analogue radio ===
Frequency	kW	Service	Notes
89.4 MHz	5	BBC Radio 2	88.9 MHz Prior to c.1985
91.6 MHz	5	BBC Radio 3	91.1 MHz Prior to c.1985
93.8 MHz	5	BBC Radio Ulster	93.3 MHz Prior to c.1985
95.6 MHz	5	BBC Radio 4	Since 1993
96.6 MHz	5	Downtown Radio	Since 1987
99.0 MHz	5	BBC Radio 1	Since 1993
101.2 MHz		Q Radio Tyrone & Fermanagh	Since 2006

=== Digital radio ===
Frequency	Block	kW	Operator
225.648 MHz	12B	3.2	BBC National DAB
229.072 MHz	12D	4.35	Bauer Northern Ireland

=== Digital television ===
Including Sept 2019 Frequency changes.

Frequency	UHF	kW	Operator	System
474.000 MHz	21 (Was 21+)	2	SDN	DVB-T
554.000 MHz	31 (Was 22+)	20	Digital 3&4	DVB-T
498.000 MHz	24	2	Arqiva A	DVB-T
602.000 MHz	37 (Was 25)	20	BBC B	DVB-T2
522.000 MHz	27	2	Arqiva B	DVB-T
538.000 MHz	29 (Was 28)	20	BBC A	DVB-T
546.000 MHz	30 (Was 30-)	2	NImux	DVB-T2

- NImux contains TG4, RTÉ One, RTÉ Two and RTÉ Raidió na Gaeltachta and transmits from this and two other sites in Northern Ireland.

==== Before switchover ====
Frequency	UHF	kW	Operator
490.166 MHz	23+	0.5	SDN (Mux A)
514.166 MHz	26+	0.5	BBC (Mux B)
538.166 MHz	29+	0.5	Arqiva (Mux C)
546.166 MHz	30+	0.5	BBC (Mux 1)
570.166 MHz	33+	0.5	Arqiva (Mux D)
578.166 MHz	34+	0.5	Digital 3&4 (Mux 2)

=== Analogue television (before 24 October 2012) ===
Analogue tv is now ceased. BBC2 Northern Ireland was switched off from UHF 28 on 10 October 2012, and the other 3 analogue services went on 24 October 2012.

Frequency	UHF	kW	Service
479.25 MHz	22	100	BBC One Northern Ireland
503.25 MHz	25	100	UTV
527.25 MHz	28	100	BBC Two Northern Ireland
559.25 MHz	32	100	Channel 4

== See also ==
- Divis transmitting station
- Limavady transmitting station
