= Divis transmitting station =

Transmitter near Belfast, Northern Ireland

Divis
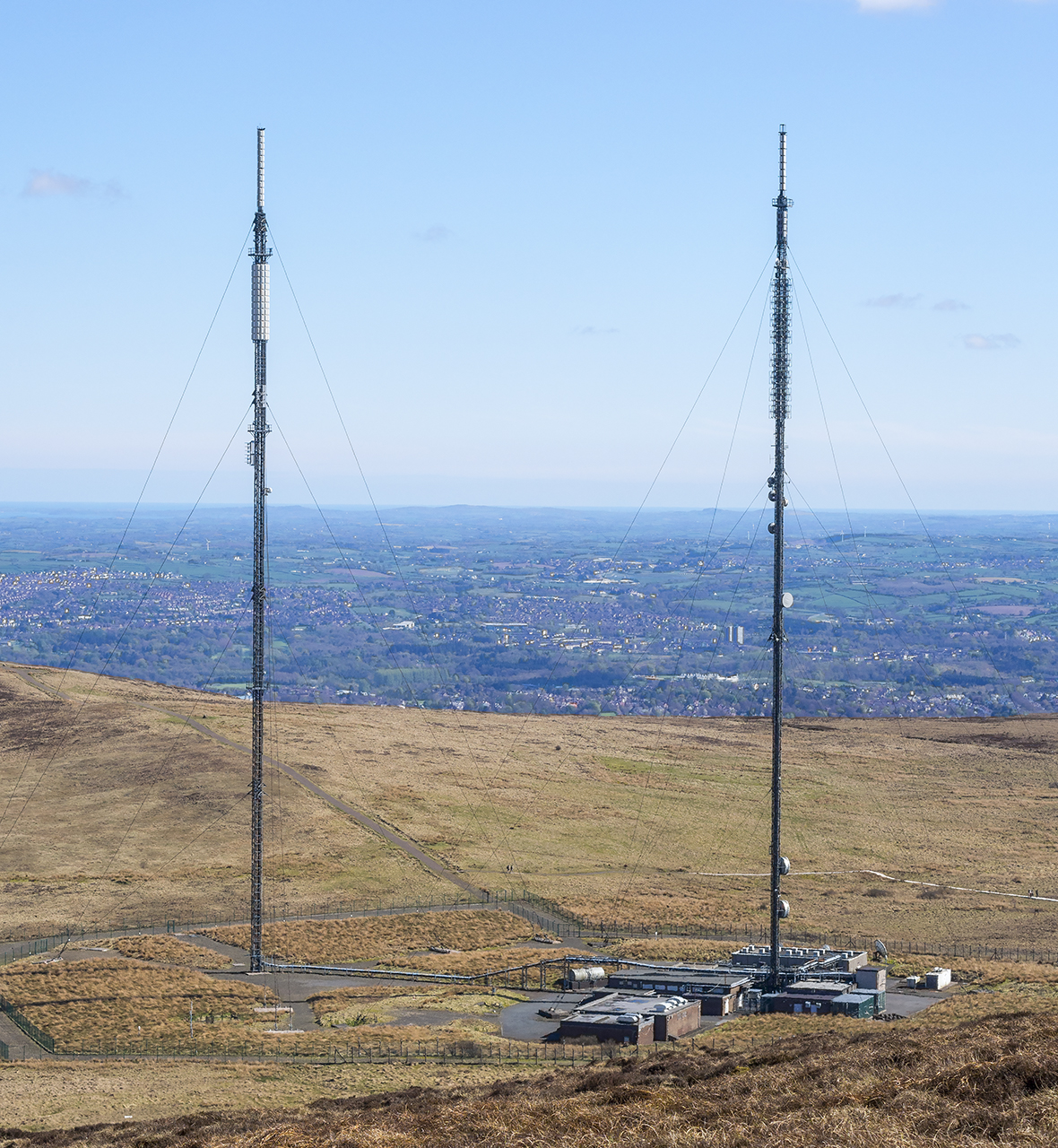

- Location within Northern Ireland
- Location: Hannahstown, County Antrim
- Mast height: 140.7 metres (462 ft)
- Coordinates: 54.6075°N 6.009444°W
- Grid reference: NW4111830995
- BBC region: BBC Northern Ireland
- ITV region: UTV
- Local TV service: NVTV

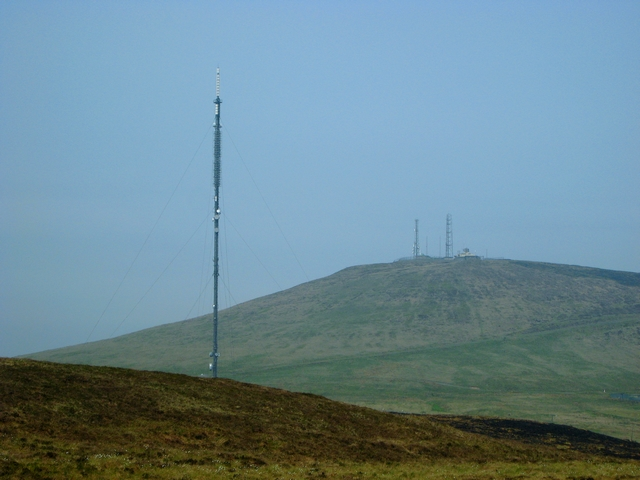
Transmitter in 2007

Divis transmitting station is the main high-power UHF and BBC National FM/DAB station that serves Belfast, County Antrim and parts of County Down.

== History ==
Situated just outside Belfast, it is the primary UHF/FM main station in Northern Ireland and was originally Northern Ireland's main BBC 405-line television transmitter, coming into operation in this capacity on 21 July 1955. As such, it was the first permanent television transmitter to be established within the island of Ireland. It was built by J. L. Eve Construction, which also built the similar-height Meldrum transmitting station for north-east Scotland, at the same time.

Although one of three UHF main stations in Northern Ireland, it is the only one to feature a stayed mast; the other stations at Brougher Mountain and Limavady both utilising smaller self-supporting towers. Stayed masts are however located at the UHF relay stations at Derry and Strabane (respectively former BBC and ITA 405-line relays) and at Black Mountain, the former ITA 405-line (and Channel 5) main station sited adjacent to Divis. It is owned and operated by Arqiva.

The Divis station is located in a range of hills directly overlooking Belfast from the west, in an area which was controlled by the Ministry of Defence until it was sold in 2004 to the National Trust and subsequently opened to the public. It is sited between the peaks of Divis Mountain and Black Mountain and is ironically closer to the latter than the transmitter that is named after it.

== Television history ==
Divis was opened by the BBC on 21 July 1955 as its permanent 405-line Band I transmission facility serving Northern Ireland. It superseded the temporary station at Glencairn, which was one of two transmitters (the other being Pontop Pike) to be rushed into operation on 1 May 1953, in time for the televised Coronation of Queen Elizabeth II. Although the BBC had by this time already obtained the Divis site, the need to construct the long access road was the primary factor preventing its immediate use.

Divis was designated as a medium-power transmitter, on which type of installation the second phase of BBC Band I stations were based. In this respect, Divis was grouped with permanent installations at Meldrum, North Hessary Tor, Pontop Pike, Rowridge, Sandale and Tacolneston. Transmissions from Divis were on VHF Channel 1 at a peak output of 35 kW vision e.r.p.

In due course, a number of relay stations were established across Northern Ireland to enhance coverage from Divis, most notably at Derry’s Sheriff's Mountain transmitter which opened in December 1957, and Brougher Mountain in County Fermanagh which opened in February 1964, the latter being the site of a future UHF main station.

In the meantime, the Independent Television Authority (ITA) built its equivalent 405-line VHF Band III station close to Divis. Located at Black Mountain quarry, less than two miles to the south-west, this came into operation on 31 October 1959 and utilised a taller 750-ft mast.

Test transmissions on UHF began late February 1967. Divis became the UHF main station for Belfast and the surrounding area when BBC2 began on Saturday March 18 1967. Waldo Maguire was Controller of BBC Northern Ireland.

Colour test transmissions began on Monday October 30 1967, and BBC2 colour began on December 2 1967.

ITV Colour UHF transmitters began on Monday September 14 1970, with BBC1 in the same week.

Both this site and Black Mountain are dual ring-fenced for security.

It was announced that the 152.5m transmitter mast at Divis would be removed and replaced by a new guyed steel mast (192.7 m). This meant for a period of time there would be two broadcast masts at the site in preparation for the digital switchover in the Ulster region which occurred in October 2012. However a new 152m guyed mast has been constructed and the original mast remains to carry VHF and DAB services.

The Divis site contributes significantly to the telecommunications network for much of Northern Ireland.

== Services available ==
=== Digital television ===
Digital television services broadcast on the following frequencies with the following powers:

Frequency	UHF	kW	Operator	System
474.166 MHz	21+	100	PSB2 (D3&4)	DVB-T
490.000 MHz	23	50	COM4 (SDN)	DVB-T
498.000 MHz	24	100	PSB3 (BBC B)	DVB-T2
514.000 MHz	26	50	COM5 (ARQ A)	DVB-T
522.000 MHz	27	100	PSB1 (BBC A)	DVB-T
546.000 MHz	30	50	COM6 (ARQ B)	DVB-T
594.000 MHz	36	10	LTVmux	DVB-T
690.000 MHz	48	0.01	NIMM (RTÉ)	DVB-T2
746.000 MHz	55	8.9	COM7 (Closed)	DVB-T2

==== Before switchover ====
Frequency	UHF	kW	Operator
489.833 MHz	23-	2.3	SDN (Mux A)
513.833 MHz	26-	2.3	BBC (Mux B)
538.000 MHz	29	2.3	BBC (Mux 1)
569.833 MHz	33-	2.3	Digital 3&4 (Mux 2)
578.166 MHz	34+	1.6	Arqiva (Mux D)
690.000 MHz	48	2	Arqiva (Mux C)

=== Analogue television ===
Analogue television services were broadcast on the following frequencies:

Frequency	UHF	kW	Service
471.25 MHz	21	500	Channel 4
495.25 MHz	24	500	UTV
519.25 MHz	27	500	BBC Two Northern Ireland
551.25 MHz	31	500	BBC One Northern Ireland
775.25 MHz	59	—	TG4

All of the above channels, except TG4, were broadcast at a power of 500 kW. As well as providing direct reception for most TV viewers in Northern Ireland, all the other analogue transmitters in the province sourced their output, either directly or indirectly, from Divis. TG4, a channel operated by a state-owned body of the Republic of Ireland, was broadcast at a very low power and not relayed to any other transmitters. Channel 5 was broadcast from the nearby Black Mountain transmitting station.

=== Analogue radio ===
FM radio service broadcast on the following frequencies and with the following powers:

Frequency	kW	Service
90.1 MHz	250	BBC Radio 2
92.3 MHz	250	BBC Radio 3
94.5 MHz	250	BBC Radio Ulster
96.0 MHz	125	BBC Radio 4
99.7 MHz	250	BBC Radio 1
101.9 MHz	250	Classic FM

=== Digital radio ===
DAB radio broadcasts on the following frequency:

Frequency	Block	kW	Operator
225.648 MHz	12B	10	BBC National DAB
