= Julian Simon (disambiguation) =

Julian Simon is an economist.

Julian Simon may also refer to:

- Julián Simón, Spanish motorcycle racer
- Julian Simon Fellowship
- Julian Simon (tennis), see Andy Ram

== See also ==
- Jules Simon, French politician
- Julian Simmons, TV presenter
- Julien Simon, French professional cyclist
