= Meldrum transmitting station =

Transmitter station in Aberdeenshire, Scotland

Meldrum
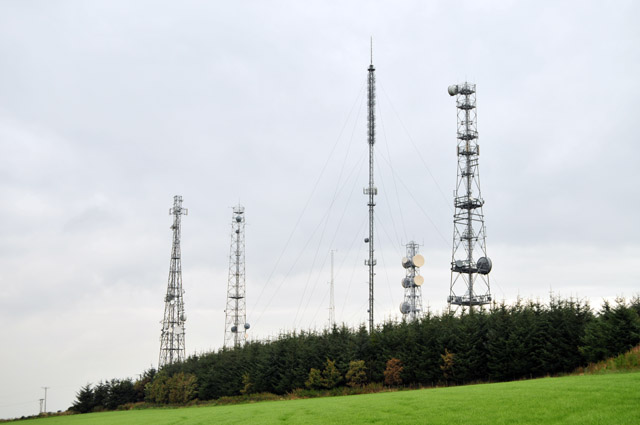

- Location within Aberdeenshire
- Location: Oldmeldrum, Aberdeenshire
- Mast height: 135 metres (443 ft)
- Coordinates: 57.3855°N 2.4°W
- Grid reference: NJ760328
- Built: 1955
- BBC region: BBC Scotland (1955–1985)

The Meldrum transmitting station is a broadcasting and telecommunications facility, situated on Core Hill, 4.3 miles (6.9 km) north-west of the village of Oldmeldrum in Aberdeenshire. It is owned and operated by Arqiva.

== History ==
It was built by J. L. Eve Construction in the mid-1950s, who also built the similar height Divis transmitting station at the same time.

== Channels listed by frequency ==
=== Analogue radio (VHF FM) ===
Frequency	kW	Service
88.7 MHz	150	BBC Radio 2
90.9 MHz	150	BBC Radio 3
93.1 MHz	150	BBC Radio Scotland
95.3 MHz	150	BBC Radio 4
98.3 MHz	150	BBC Radio 1
104.2 MHz	150	BBC Radio nan Gàidheal

=== Digital radio (DAB) ===
Frequency	Block	kW	Operator
220.352 MHz	11C	8.51	Switch Aberdeen
225.6483 MHz	12B	10	BBC National DAB

=== Analogue television ===
405-line monochrome analogue television signals were broadcast from Meldrum from its launch in 1955 until the nationwide shutdown of VHF signals in 1985.

Frequency	VHF	kW	Service
61.75 MHz	4	17	BBC1 Scotland

== See also ==
- List of masts
- List of tallest buildings and structures in Great Britain
- List of radio stations in the United Kingdom
