= Pamela Ballantine =

Northern Irish television presenter

Pamela Ballantine MBE
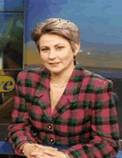
- Born: Pamela Rolston; 20 October 1958 (age 67); Belfast, Northern Ireland
- Education: Richmond Lodge
- Years active: 1983-present
- Spouse: John Paul Ballantine (1985-1994)

Pamela Ballantine MBE (née Rolston, born 20 October 1958, Belfast) is a freelance Northern Irish television presenter, best known for her 27-year career at UTV.

== Broadcasting career ==
Ballantine began her broadcasting career at Downtown Radio as a secretary, and gradually moved on to reading and reporting for the Downtown newsroom, as well as presenting her own programme and covering for other programmes on the station. She later worked for BBC Radio Ulster as a morning presenter before moving to Ulster Television as a continuity announcer and news presenter in 1983.

Ballantine moved from the continuity department to become a regular newsreader on UTV Live at its launch in 1993. She went on to present and report for the nightly magazine show, UTV Life, from March 1999 to February 2009.

She was also a regular presenter and reporter for RPM. and presented UTV game shows Ulster Schools Quiz and Hot Pursuits in 1994.

In 2009, Ballantine returned to the UTV continuity department and became a relief weather presenter at the station. This followed press reports claiming UTV management had offered her the option of accepting a different role at the station or taking a redundancy severance package from the company.

A year later, her staff contract with the station was not renewed. Press reports claimed UTV had told Ballantine that her role was no longer available and had offered her freelance work, which she later accepted.

Ballantine continues to freelance for the station as a continuity announcer and ambassador, occasionally presenting the weather or newsreading. In 2016, she returned to presenting UTV Life, which airs every Friday evening.

== Writing ==
Ballantine worked as a weekly columnist for the Belfast Telegraph.

== Personal life ==
Pamela Ballantine was married to Downtown Radio presenter John Paul Ballantine until 1994.
