= Black Mountain transmitting station =

Broadcasting and telecommunications facility near Belfast, Northern Ireland

Black Mountain
- Mast height: 228.6 metres (750 ft)
- Coordinates: 54°35′13″N 6°01′20″W
- Grid reference: J278727
- Built: 1959
- Relay of: Divis
- BBC region: BBC Northern Ireland
- ITV region: UTV

The Black Mountain transmitting station is a broadcasting and telecommunications facility, situated on Black Mountain to the west of the city of Belfast, on land 301 metres (988 ft) above Ordnance Datum (mean sea level) in Northern Ireland (grid reference J278727). It includes a guyed steel lattice mast which is 228.6 metres (750 ft) in height. The height of the top of the structure above mean sea level is 529 metres (1,736 ft). It is owned and operated by Arqiva.

== History ==
=== Construction ===
It was built by BICC.

=== Transmission ===
- 1959: The station is commissioned by the Independent Television Authority to transmit ITV signals (provided by Ulster Television) on 405-line VHF, using Channel 9 (Band III) on high power. Test transmissions commence on 1 October with official service from 31 October.
- 1970: UHF 625-line PAL colour television begins at high power from the adjacent Divis transmitting station.
- 1975: A low power UHF filler service begins, designed to cover districts close to the station that cannot pick up Divis.
- 1976: FM commercial radio station Downtown Radio (later Cool FM) starts transmissions.
- 1985: VHF 405-line television is discontinued in the UK, having been replaced by the UHF service. The VHF service from Black Mountain closes.
- 1990: FM commercial radio station BCR (later City Beat) now Q Radio begins on 96.7 MHz on 6 April.
- 1997: Analogue transmissions of Channel 5 begin at high power.
- 2001: DAB Digital Radio transmissions start from Score Northern Ireland on block 12D on 6 September.
- 2005: FM station U105 begins on 105.8 MHz on 14 November.
- 2012: On 24 October analogue television services are ceased and replaced by digital multiplexes. NImux launches at this and two other transmitter sites in Northern Ireland transmitting TG4, RTÉ One, RTÉ Two and RTÉ Raidió na Gaeltachta to the region.
- 2019: Further frequency changes took place in September as part of the 700 MHz clearance plan for new mobile telecom services,

== Coverage ==
For high power transmissions of Cool FM, and formerly analogue Channel 5, coverage includes most of central and eastern Ulster, north as far as Ballymena, south as far as Downpatrick and Newry, and west past Dungannon and Cookstown.

Radio stations Q Radio and U105 have a more restricted coverage area, including areas around Greater Belfast, up to Carrickfergus, Antrim, and the shore of Lough Neagh.

With the exception of the NIMM broadcasts, the low power digital TV transmissions are designed only to cover areas of Belfast not already covered by Divis.

== Service availability by frequency ==
=== Analogue radio ===
Frequency	kW	Service
96.7 MHz	0.55	Q Radio Belfast
97.4 MHz	3.2	Cool FM
105.8 MHz	0.96	U105

=== Digital radio ===
Frequency	Block	kW	Operator
229.072 MHz	12D	7	Bauer Northern Ireland

=== Analogue television ===
==== 31 October 1959 – 8 August 1975 ====
Frequency	VHF	kW	Service
194.75 MHz	9	100	UTV

==== 8 August 1975 – 2 November 1982 ====
Frequency	VHF	UHF	kW	Service
194.75 MHz	9	—	100	UTV
615.25 MHz	—	39	0.025	BBC1 Northern Ireland
663.25 MHz	—	45	0.025	BBC2 Northern Ireland
695.25 MHz	—	49	0.025	UTV

==== 2 November 1982 – 3 January 1985 ====
Frequency	VHF	UHF	kW	Service
194.75 MHz	9	—	100	UTV
615.25 MHz	—	39	0.025	BBC1 Northern Ireland
631.25 MHz	—	41	0.025	Channel 4
663.25 MHz	—	45	0.025	BBC2 Northern Ireland
695.25 MHz	—	49	0.025	UTV

==== 3 January 1985 – 30 March 1997 ====
The 405 line tv system was ceased after 26 years, and for the next 27 years Black Mountain only broadcast on 625 line tv

Frequency	UHF	kW	Service
615.25 MHz	39	0.025	BBC1 Northern Ireland
631.25 MHz	41	0.025	Channel 4
663.25 MHz	45	0.025	BBC2 Northern Ireland
695.25 MHz	49	0.025	UTV

==== 30 March 1997 – 10 October 2012 ====
Frequency	UHF	kW	Service
599.25 MHz	37	50	Channel 5
615.25 MHz	39	0.025	BBC One Northern Ireland
631.25 MHz	41	0.025	Channel 4
663.25 MHz	45	0.025	BBC Two Northern Ireland
695.25 MHz	49	0.025	UTV

=== Analogue and digital television ===
==== 10 October 2012 – 24 October 2012 ====
BBC2 was switched off on UHF 45. BBC A was launched on the old BBC2 frequency.

Frequency	UHF	kW	Service	System
599.25 MHz	37	50	Channel 5	PAL System I
615.25 MHz	39	0.025	BBC One Northern Ireland	PAL System I
631.25 MHz	41	0.025	Channel 4	PAL System I
666.000 MHz	45	0.005	BBC A	DVB-T
695.25 MHz	49	0.025	UTV	PAL System I

=== Digital television ===
==== 24 October 2012 – present ====
Digital television replaced the old analogue signals during October 2012. An additional multiplex named NImux including TG4, RTÉ One, RTÉ Two and RTÉ Raidió na Gaeltachta launched at switchover here and at two other transmitters in Northern Ireland. In September 2019 further frequency changes took place.

Frequency	UHF	kW	Operating name	System
570.166 MHz	33 (was 39+)	3	NImux	DVB-T2
658.000 MHz	44 (Was 42)	0.005	Digital 3&4	DVB-T
634.000 MHz	41 (Was 45)	0.005	BBC A	DVB-T
682.000 MHz	47 (Was 49)	0.005	BBC B	DVB-T2

== See also ==
- List of masts
- List of tallest buildings and structures in the United Kingdom
- List of radio stations in the United Kingdom
