= Hannahstown =

Coordinates: 54.58°N 6.03°W

Hannahstown: Irish: Baile Haine
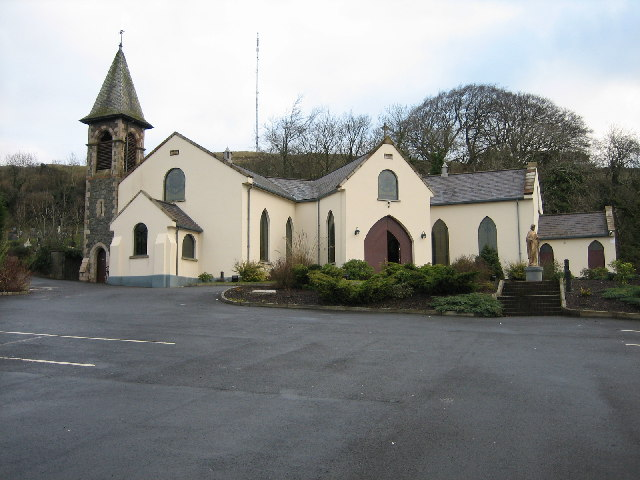
- St Joseph's church

- Location within Northern Ireland
- Population: 6,498 (2011 Census)
- Irish grid reference: J 272 724
- District: Belfast
- County: County Antrim
- Country: Northern Ireland
- Sovereign state: United Kingdom
- Post town: Belfast
- Postcode district: BT17
- Dialling code: 028
- UK Parliament: Belfast West
- NI Assembly: Belfast West

Hannahstown is a small village in County Antrim, Northern Ireland, on the outskirts of Belfast. It gives its name to a townland, parish and a suburb of Belfast. According to the 2011 United Kingdom census it had a population of 6,498.

== History ==
The area now known as Hannahstown was once known by the name of Ballincollig. A group of people whose family name was Hanna moved to the area in the 18th century. They moved in sufficient numbers for the village to be later be known by the name of 'Hannah's Town' in the early 19th century.

== Buildings ==
Among the most notable buildings and institutions in Hannahstown is Lámh Dhearg GAC a GAA club.

The Catholic parish dates back to 1797 when a small church was built for the emerging Catholic population which lived in the high ground above Belfast.

Within decades St Joseph's Church was constructed and became a critically important focal point for the development of the Catholic faith in the emerging city of Belfast.

Divis transmitting station is located on nearby Divis mountain.
