= Black Mountain (Belfast) =

Hill overlooking Belfast, Northern Ireland

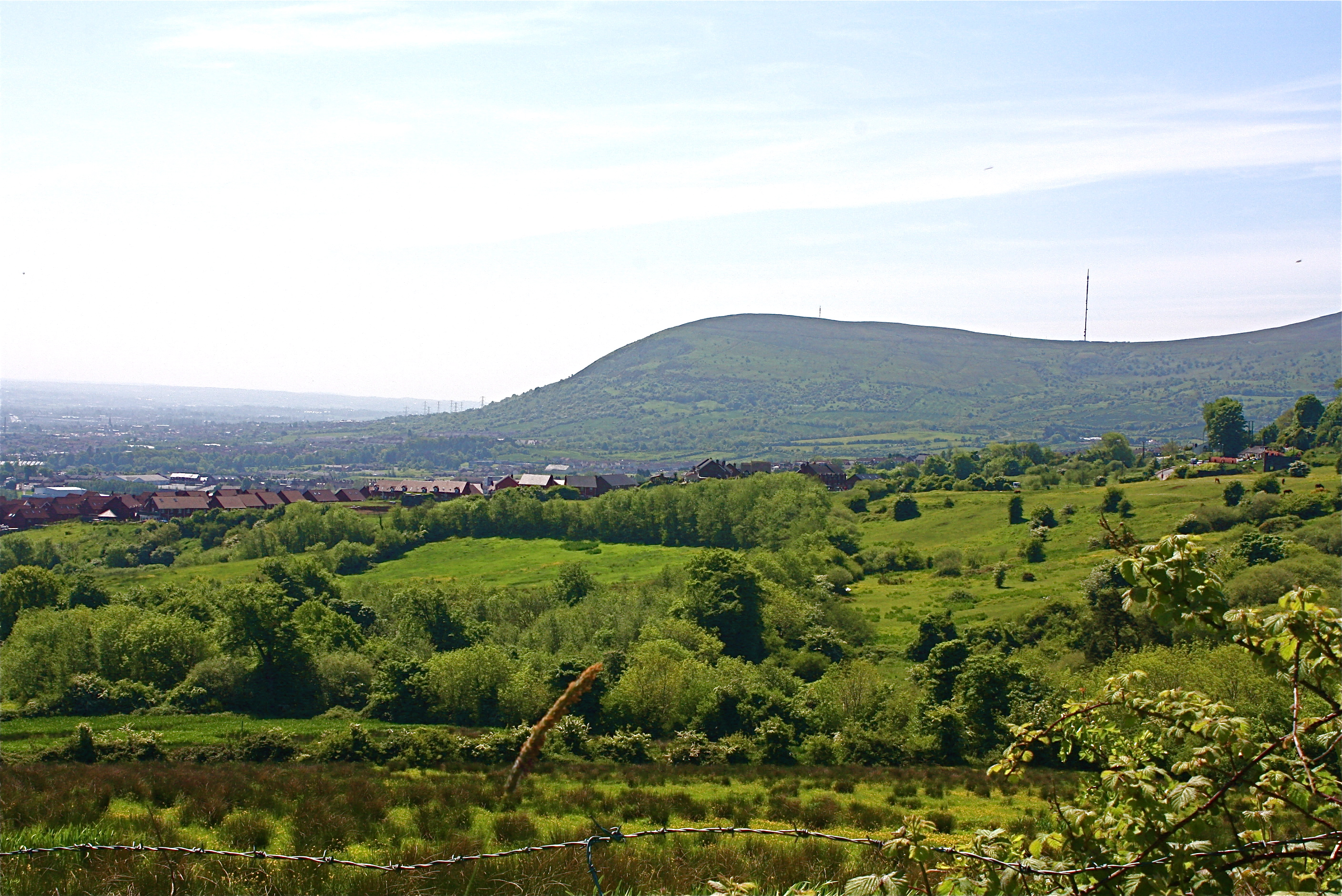
- Black Mountain viewed from Cavehill

Highest point
- Elevation: 389 m (1,276 ft)
- Coordinates: 54°36′N 5°59′W

Geography
- Location within Northern Ireland
- Location: near Belfast, County Antrim, Northern Ireland
- OSI/OSNI grid: J266741
- Topo map: OSNI Discoverer 15

Geology
- Mountain type: basalt

Black Mountain is a prominent hill overlooking the city of Belfast, Northern Ireland. Rising to a height of 1,275 ft (389 m), it dominates much of west Belfast and, together with the adjoining Divis mountain, forms part of the Belfast Hills range.

The name Black Mountain is believed to derive from its association with Divis, whose name comes from the Irish Dubhais, meaning "black ridge". It is possible that the two summits were historically regarded as a single mountain mass.

The summit area contains the Black Mountain transmitting station, a broadcasting site serving the Belfast region.

== Geography ==
Black Mountain lies immediately west of Belfast, overlooking districts including Andersonstown, Ballymurphy and Finaghy. Its elevated position affords extensive views across the city, Belfast Lough, Lough Neagh and, in clear conditions, parts of Scotland and the Isle of Man. The hill forms part of a continuous upland chain with Divis and Cave Hill, creating a distinct transition between urban and rural landscapes.

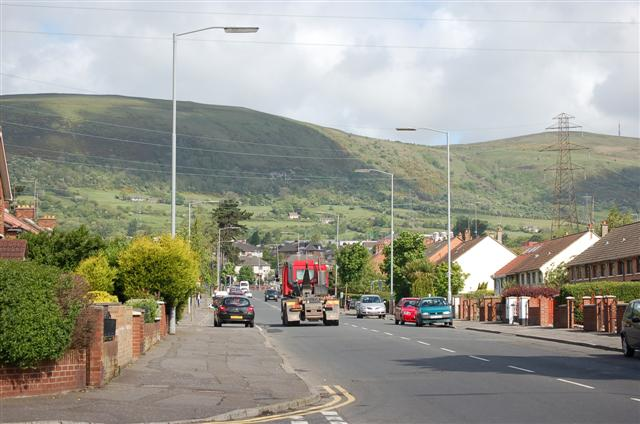
Black Mountain from Finaghy Road North

== Geology ==
The mountain is composed primarily of basalt formed during Paleogene volcanic activity, overlying a limestone substrate. Quarrying activity has exposed these geological layers, making the area of interest for earth science study. Similar geological formations are found at nearby Cave Hill.

== History and archaeology ==
Archaeological evidence indicates long-term human activity on Black Mountain. Finds in the area include flint artefacts and the remains of prehistoric settlement, with evidence of Neolithic and later occupation such as hut circles, monuments and raths (ringforts). Historic field systems, abandoned farmsteads and overgrown paths also survive.

== Military use ==
Black Mountain was first leased by the Ministry of Defence in 1953 during the Cold War. The site was used as a military training area, including a small arms range, and later as a communications facility. When the lease expired in 1986, the land was purchased outright by the Ministry of Defence and remained in military use throughout much of the period of the Troubles. The site was declared surplus to requirements in 1999.

== Ownership, conservation and access ==
For much of the late 20th century, public access to Black Mountain was restricted due to military use, private ownership and quarrying activity. In 2004, the National Trust completed the purchase of Divis and most of Black Mountain for approximately £3 million, with funding support from the Environment and Heritage Service and the Heritage Lottery Fund.

Following the acquisition, extensive conservation and restoration work was undertaken. This included the removal of over 1,000 tonnes of debris, construction of paths (including a floating path to the summit of Black Mountain), securing former military structures, and the installation of fencing and signage. The site was formally opened to the public in June 2005 and is now managed by the National Trust in partnership with local organisations.

== Recreation ==
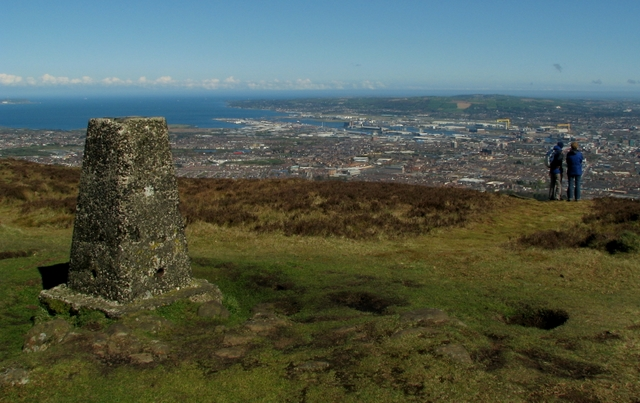
The summit overlooking Belfast

Black Mountain is a destination for walking, recreation and nature observation. A network of paths links the mountain with Divis, forming one of the most accessible upland walking areas close to Belfast. The site has been recognised for its environmental and recreational value, winning the Amazing Spaces award in November 2005.
