= UTV2 =

Television channel

- Country: United Kingdom
- Broadcast area: Northern Ireland
- Headquarters: Havelock House, Belfast

Programming
- Language: English
- Picture format: 576i (SDTV)

Ownership
- Owner: Ulster Television plc
- Sister channels: UTV

History
- Launched: 28 June 1999; 27 years ago
- Closed: 22 January 2002; 24 years ago
- Replaced by: ITV2
- Former names: TV You (1999-2000)

Links
- Website: u.tv

Availability (at time of closure)

Terrestrial
- ITV Digital: Channel 6

UTV2 was a television channel, owned by Ulster Television plc (now News Broadcasting). The channel was on digital terrestrial television and NTL cable in Northern Ireland.

== History ==
On 30 March 1998, with digital television set to launch in the UK later that year, UTV announced it intended to launch "a new regionally focused digital channel" in spring 1999.

The channel launched on 28 June 1999 as TV You. The schedule mostly consisted of a simulcast with ITV2 as broadcast in England, Wales and the Scottish Borders. The channel also broadcast various archived programmes from UTV. In contrast to ITV2, TV You did not carry any advertising due to its low viewership. The channel was rebranded as UTV2 at the end of 2000, in order to align itself with ITV2, but would not remove its local programming.

UTV and ITV2 were made available to Sky Digital customers in Northern Ireland in November 2001, leading to speculation that UTV2 would soon close on digital terrestrial. Following a deal with ITV Digital, UTV2 subsequently closed on 22 January 2002 and was replaced by ITV2.

== See also ==
- UTV
- ITV2
- S2
