= BBC Choice Northern Ireland =

- Country: Northern Ireland
- Network: BBC Choice

Ownership
- Owner: BBC Northern Ireland
- Sister channels: BBC One Northern Ireland; BBC Two Northern Ireland

History
- Launched: 23 September 1998; 26 years ago
- Closed: 30 March 2001; 24 years ago
- Replaced by: Digital version of BBC Two Northern Ireland

Availability (at time of closure)

Terrestrial
- DTT: Channel 7

BBC Choice Northern Ireland was the national variation for BBC Northern Ireland of the BBC Choice service, that was broadcast by the BBC.

As with the local variants of BBC Choice in Scotland and Wales, BBC Choice Northern Ireland carried much of its content from the network BBC Choice service originating in London, but split off most evenings for around two hours a night (generally around 10pm to midnight) of local programming to Northern Ireland. When the EastEnders rebroadcast aired at 10pm, local programming would begin at 10.30pm. After around midnight, programming would revert to the network service until closedown.

== Broadcasting ==
The service was available on the ONdigital/ITV Digital terrestrial service and cable in Northern Ireland only, and on the Sky Digital satellite service across the UK – listed as channel 160 on Sky in Northern Ireland and at the rear of the programme guide elsewhere in the UK; this was as part of a system to allow the correct regional variant for the viewer's area to be accessed from the primary channel number.

== History ==
The BBC Choice Northern Ireland service launched alongside the other BBC Choice variants on 23 September 1998 and ceased broadcasting on 30 March 2001 and it was replaced by a fully networked BBC Choice. The channel was then itself replaced from 2003 by BBC Three, which has never had any regional variants. None of the BBC's other digital services offer variants (whilst BBC One HD currently offers a single UK-wide service based on the Network schedule, with local programme out-outs in Scotland, Wales, NI and the English regions currently available in SD only.)

Following the closure of BBC Choice's regional variants in 2001, BBC Two's variants for Scotland, Wales and Northern Ireland were made available to digital viewers (previously a single UK-wide version of BBC Two had been available on digital platforms).

Following the closure of BBC Choice Northern Ireland in 2001, a 'digital version' of BBC Two Northern Ireland launched which was separate to that available on analogue; it carried many of the NI-specific programme opt-outs as on the analogue service, but also carried some additional digital-only programmes, in the main carried over from BBC Choice NI. This dual-service continued until October 2006, when it was decided to recombine the two BBC Two services for Northern Ireland into a single schedule, which is the service now available.

== Programmes ==
- Newsline Extra
- PK Tonight
- The Maternity
- Choice Cuts
- XIth Hour
- Awash with Colour
- Spotlight
- Greenfingers
- Comic Asides
- The DIY Show
- Straight Talking
- Chosen Words
- Big Houses
- Saints and Scholars
- Rankin Challenge

== Presenters ==
- Kathy Clugston
- Jennie Browne
- Michael Selby
