= Kelly (talk show) =

- Genre: Talk/Variety show
- Starring: Gerry Kelly
- Country of origin: Northern Ireland
- Original language: English
- No. of episodes: 571

Production
- Production location: Havelock House, Belfast

Original release
- Network: UTV
- Release: September 1989 – 16 December 2005

Kelly is a regional talk and variety show, hosted by broadcaster Gerry Kelly and broadcast on UTV from 1989 to 2005.

The show was twice voted the most entertaining programme in Northern Ireland.

== History ==
Kelly debuted as a late night chat show in September 1989, airing for an hour on Friday nights after News at Ten. The show was subsequently extended to 90 minutes a year later, running from 10.40 pm to 12.10 am, before moving to a prime time slot of 9 pm in 1999. The series was also shown briefly on Scottish Television in 1992.

For the first four years of the show's life, the Kelly show was made from a very small general purpose studio at UTV's (known until 1993 as Ulster Television) headquarters in Havelock House, Belfast. The studio could only fit a very small set and a very small audience. To accommodate the audience, the audience seating platform was built over the scenery doors to the studio, meaning some members of the audience would be sitting very close to the doors and close to the hot studio lights in those early years. In 1993 Ulster Television was relaunched as UTV and unveiled a new 2,500-square-foot (230 m^{2}) studio which could now accommodate a proper studio audience of around 100–120 with a new built in audience seating platform, which was ideal for the show.

In 1999, he interviewed a nine-year-old Rory McIlroy after he had won the world under ten's championship. The series reached its 500th episode in 2003, and the highest-rated edition was broadcast on Friday 10 November 2000, when a special edition dedicated to George Best was watched by 367,000 viewers.

=== Cancellation ===
The end of the series was announced by UTV in 2005. Despite calls to save the series from ending, the final episode of Kelly was transmitted on 16 December 2005.

Gerry Kelly said that UTV were unhappy with the show airing in the 9pm slot, as UTV had to opt out of ITV's network schedule. Instead of moving the show to a new different timeslot, UTV took the decision to axe it completely. Around the same time, UTV also axed the rest of its local entertainment programming – namely, School Around the Corner and School Choir of the Year – as part of cutbacks to the station's local output.

After the show ended, Kelly went on to host a smaller-scale chat show, Gerry Meets, which ran for 40 episodes before leaving UTV at the start of 2008.
