= Strabane transmitting station =

Transmitter station in Northern Ireland

Strabane
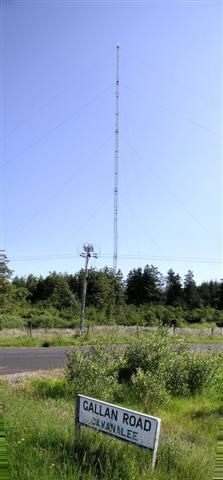

- Mast height: 305.5 metres (1,002 ft)
- Coordinates: 54°47′58″N 7°23′19″W
- Grid reference: H393947
- Built: 1963
- Relay of: Limavady
- BBC region: BBC Northern Ireland
- ITV region: UTV

The Strabane transmitting station is a broadcasting and telecommunications facility located at Legfordrum and situated very close to the town of Strabane, in County Tyrone, Northern Ireland (Grid Reference: H393947, GNR: IH393947). It is owned and operated by Arqiva.

It includes a 305.5 metres (1,002 ft) high guyed steel lattice mast, which is the tallest structure in Ireland. The transmission antennas surmounting the structure are contained within a fibreglass cylinder. Constructed in 1963, it came into service on 18 February of that year.

== History ==
It was originally commissioned by the Independent Television Authority to bring ITV signals (provided by Ulster Television) to the west of Northern Ireland, including the districts of Derry and Enniskillen on 405-line VHF, using Channel 8 (Band III). The transmitter commenced full service on Monday 18 February 1963. 405 line television was discontinued in the UK in 1985.

When UHF television came to Northern Ireland, main transmitters were commissioned at Limavady and Brougher Mountain, near Omagh. However this left a gap in the Strabane and Newtownstewart areas, so in July 1977 UHF television was added to the Strabane site. Due to the elevation of the antennas (584 m above sea level), a 2kW effective radiated power was sufficient to cover a very wide area, with coverage available well into County Donegal.

In 2001, the site was installed with a transmitter for Score Northern Ireland, a regional digital radio multiplex.

Digital switchover took place in Northern Ireland in October 2012, when analogue TV transmissions from this station were replaced by digital transmissions. The coverage area is approximately the same as the analogue services, and there are three digital multiplexes transmitted.

== Services listed by frequency ==
=== Digital radio (DAB) ===
Frequency	Block	kW	Operator
229.072 MHz	12D	5	Bauer Northern Ireland

=== Digital television until 04/09/2019 ===
Frequency	UHF	kW	Operator	System
618.166 MHz	39+	0.4	BBC B	DVB-T2
642.000 MHz	42	0.4	Digital 3&4	DVB-T
666.000 MHz	45	0.4	BBC A	DVB-T

=== Digital television after 04/09/2019 ===
Frequency	UHF	kW	Operator	System
562.000 MHz	32	0.4	BBC A	DVB-T
578.000 MHz	34	0.4	Digital 3&4	DVB-T
586.166 MHz	35+	0.4	BBC B	DVB-T2
626.000 MHz	40	0.4	NIMM	DVB-T2

=== Analogue television ===
Analogue TV is now Ceased. BBC Two Northern Ireland was switched off on UHF channel 45 on the 10TH OF OCTOBER 2012, and the remaining 3 channels go on the 24TH OF OCTOBER 2012

Frequency	UHF	kW	Service
615.25 MHz	39	2	BBC One Northern Ireland
639.25 MHz	42	2	Channel 4
663.25 MHz	45	2	BBC Two Northern Ireland
695.25 MHz	49	2	UTV

== See also ==
- List of masts
- List of tallest structures in the United Kingdom
- List of radio stations in the United Kingdom
