= Divis =

Hill in Northern Ireland

Coordinates: 54°36′41″N 6°01′07″W

- Dubhais
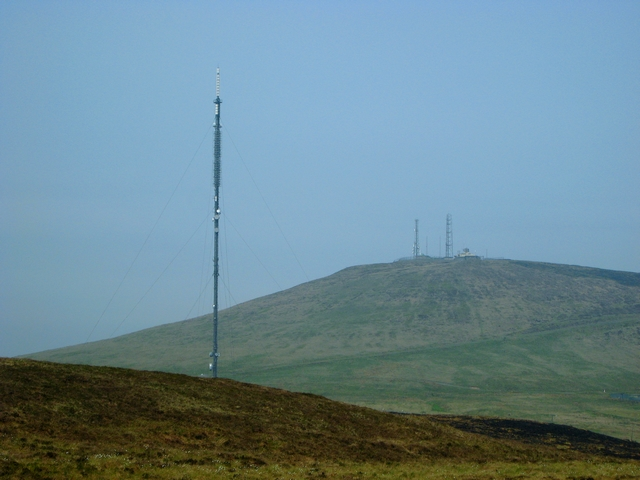

Highest point
- Elevation: 1,568 ft (478 m)
- Prominence: 1,250 ft (380 m)
- Listing: Marilyn

Naming
- English translation: black ridge
- Language of name: Irish

Geography
- Location: County Antrim, Northern Ireland
- Parent range: Belfast Hills
- OSI/OSNI grid: J280754
- Topo map: OSNI Discovery 15

Divis (/ˈdɪvɪs/; from Irish Dubhais, "black ridge") is a hill and area of sprawling moorland north-west of Belfast in County Antrim, Northern Ireland. With a height of 1,568 ft (478 m), it is the highest of the Belfast Hills. It is joined with the neighbouring Black Mountain, and in the past they may have been seen as one. Divis transmitting station is on the summit.

The mountain extends north to the Antrim Plateau and shares its geology, consisting of a basaltic cover underlain by limestone and lias clay.

In 2004 the Divis area and its surrounding mountains were handed over to the National Trust, having been under the control of the Ministry of Defence since 1953. Since then four walking trails have been developed, of varying lengths and taking walkers to different points of interest. These are the Lough, Summit, Heath and Ridge trails.

== Wildlife ==
Among the most common birds to be seen on Divis are snipes, curlews, meadow pipits, skylarks, red grouse, greenfinches, cuckoos, owls and peregrines. Less common are buzzards whose appearance is often recorded online to preserve valuable environmental data. The site is also home to badgers and hares.

== Future ==
In September 2023, the National Lottery Heritage Fund awarded the National Trust £3 million to deliver a new project that will open up new trails and routes on the mountain. The overall aim is to create "Belfast's largest urban green space".
