= Havelock House, Belfast =

Former headquarters of UTV

Coordinates: 54.589°N 5.925°W

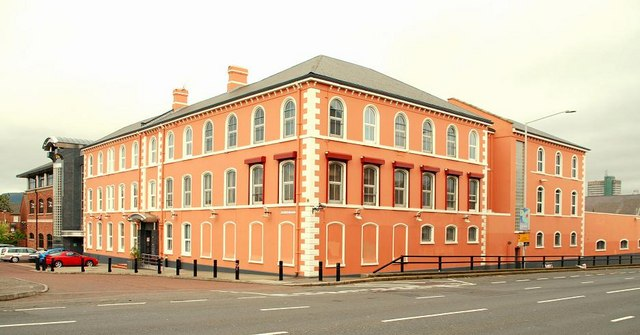
Havelock House in 2009.

Havelock House was a building that was located on the Ormeau Road in Belfast, it was the former headquarters of Wireless Group Ltd (formerly UTV Media), and also UTV, which occupied the building from October 1959 to June 2018. Wireless Group's local radio service U105 was based here from its launch to 2018 when it was transferred to new studios at City Quays 2, where the registered office of Wireless Group and also the studios of UTV (now part of ITV plc) are now located.

== History ==
Before the building was converted into a television studio complex, Havelock House was the former site of a hemstitching warehouse. During World War II, the building was the billet for troops to provide cover for Belfast's bridges. Ulster Television acquired the premises at the cost of £17,000.

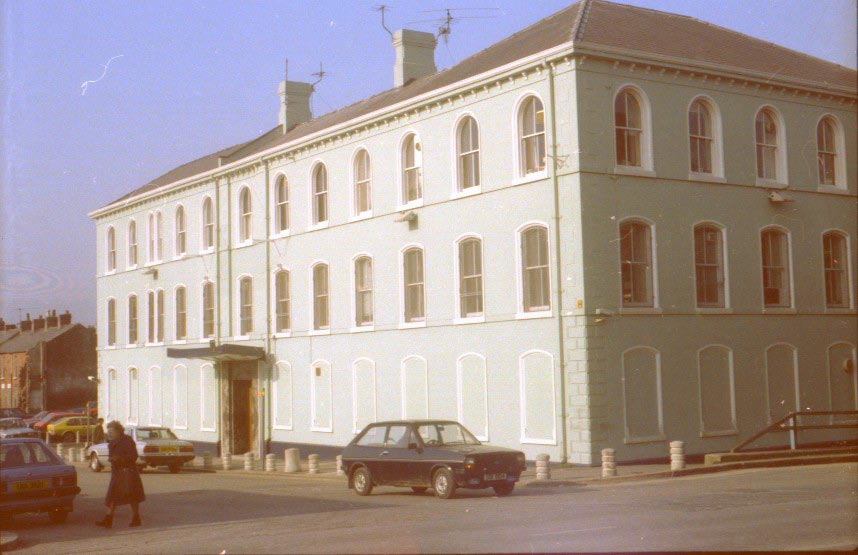
Havelock House in 1975.

Initially, the building contained one studio. A second studio was opened in the building in 1962. Construction of an extension to Havelock House began in 1992 in preparation for the station's new franchise period and its upcoming rebranding. The extension was opened on 4 June 1993, the day the station rebranded itself from Ulster Television to UTV, and the official opening of the extension was performed by former UTV newsreader, Gloria Hunniford.

For many years, UTV's studio base at Havelock House was also used by television film crews around the world to process and edit film footage of "The Troubles". ITN reporters were also regularly seen reporting on the rooftop of Havelock House, including former UTV reporter John Irvine. The building was listed for sale in April 2018 for £3,500,000, and was sold in September of the same year to Olympian Homes, who planned to use the building for a build-to-rent scheme. In November 2020, Olympian Homes made an appeal to the Belfast City Council after the council's planning committee had unanimously decided to reject the firm's plans for the site which would have demolished the building to make way for an apartment block. In October 2021, Olympian Homes' appeal was dismissed.

In spite of the rejection, Olympian Homes proceeded to demolish Havelock House starting in January 2024. The site was cleared by April.

== Notable productions ==
The local news programme UTV Live was broadcast from Studio 1 until June 2018. Studio 2 was used for many years for production of the Kelly series, the Friday night chatshow on UTV hosted by Gerry Kelly from 1989-2005. The studio was also used for light entertainment programmes such as McKeever and May McFettridge specials.

Havelock House also housed a smaller studio with a chroma key background, from where short UTV News bulletins and continuity announcements were broadcast until October 2016. This studio, which formed part of UTV's central technical area, had been in use since 2002 when it replaced Studio 3, another smaller presentation studio used for in-vision continuity and shorter news bulletins. The location of the old central technical area and Studio 3 were completely renovated in January 2003 and converted into office space for UTV Internet, which moved from a leased office site in Bruce Street in March 2003.

Among other series recorded in the studios at Havelock House include School Around the Corner, McKeever and All Mixed Up.
