= Limavady transmitting station =

Transmitter in County Londonderry, Northern Ireland

Limavady
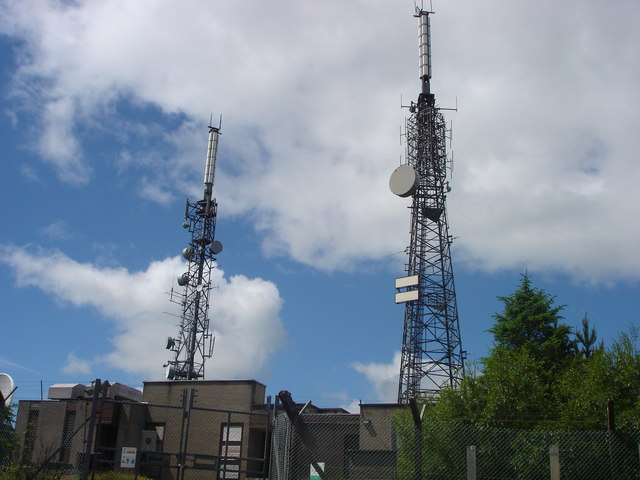

- Location within Northern Ireland
- Location: Limavady, County Londonderry
- Mast height: 34.4 metres (113 ft)
- Coordinates: 55.108°N 6.887°W
- Grid reference: C711296
- BBC region: BBC Northern Ireland
- ITV region: UTV
- Local TV service: NVTV

Limavady transmitting station is a television and radio transmitter situated near the town of Limavady, County Londonderry, Northern Ireland. It is owned and operated by Arqiva.

The Limavady transmitter was brought into service on Monday 1 December 1975, to provide UHF colour television to the North West of Northern Ireland, transmitting BBC One Northern Ireland, BBC Two Northern Ireland and Ulster Television. Channel 4 would be added to the transmitter in August 1983.

A UHF relay of the transmitter was also opened on Monday 1 December 1975 at the Londonderry transmitter, which had been transmitting BBC Television (later renamed BBC One) and radio on VHF since it commenced transmissions on Wednesday 18 December 1957.

BBC FM radio services from Limavady began in 1987 replacing a previous (lower powered) site at Maddybenny More. Commercial FM radio service having begun the previous year.

== Services available ==
=== Analogue radio ===
Frequency	kW	Service	Notes
89.6 MHz	1.7	BBC Radio 2	Since 1987 (Replaced Maddybenny More -originally 88.7 MHz)
91.8 MHz	1.7	BBC Radio 3	Since 1987 (Replaced Maddybenny More -originally 90.9 MHz)
94.0 MHz	1.7	BBC Radio 4	Since 1993 (Radio Ulster used this frequency prior)
95.4 MHz	1.7	BBC Radio Ulster	Since 1987 (Replaced Maddybenny More -originally 93.1/94.0 MHz)
96.4 MHz	1	Downtown Radio	Since 1986
99.2 MHz	1.7	BBC Radio 1	Since 1993

=== Digital radio ===
Frequency	Block	kW	Operator
225.648 MHz	12B	6.3	BBC National DAB
229.072 MHz	12D	6.2	Bauer Northern Ireland

=== Digital television ===
Includes Sept 2019 frequency changes.

Frequency	UHF	kW	Operator	System
674.000 MHz	46 (Was 49)	10	Arqiva B	DVB-T
634.000 MHz	41 (Was 50)	20	BBC A	DVB-T
626.000 MHz	40 (Was 54)	10	SDN	DVB-T
682.000 MHz	47 (Was 55)	20	BBC B	DVB-T2
650.000 MHz	43 (Was 58)	10	Arqiva A	DVB-T
658.000 MHz	44 (Was 59)	20	Digital 3&4	DVB-T

=== Amateur Radio ===
Frequency	W	Service
145.600 MHz (Output) 145.000 MHz (Input)	15	GB3LY 2M Repeater

==== Before switchover ====
Frequency	UHF	kW	Operator
730.000 MHz	53	0.8	SDN (Mux A)
761.833 MHz	57-	0.8	BBC (Mux B)
769.833 MHz	58-	0.8	Digital 3&4 (Mux 2)
786.166 MHz	60+	0.8	Arqiva (Mux C)
810.166 MHz	63+	0.8	Arqiva (Mux D)
842.000 MHz	67	0.8	BBC (Mux 1)

=== Analogue television ===
Analogue television is no longer transmitted. BBC Two was closed on 10 October 2012 and the other three services were closed on 24 October 2012.

Frequency	UHF	kW	Service
743.25 MHz	55	100	BBC One Northern Ireland
775.25 MHz	59	100	UTV
799.25 MHz	62	100	BBC Two Northern Ireland
823.25 MHz	65	100	Channel 4
