= Downtown Radio =

Radio station in Newtownards, Northern Ireland

- Belfast; Northern Ireland
- Frequencies: DAB: 12D Northern Ireland; FM: 96.4 MHz Coleraine; FM: 96.6 MHz Omagh and Donegal; FM: 97.1 MHz Larne; FM: 102.3 MHz Ballymena; FM: 102.4 MHz Derry; FM: 103.1 MHz Newry and Dundalk; FM: 103.4 MHz Newtownabbey and Belfast; FM: 103.4 MHz Newcastle, County Down
- RDS: Downtown

Programming
- Format: AC

Ownership
- Owner: Bauer Media Audio UK
- Sister stations: Cool FM Cool FM Old Skool Downtown Country; Greatest Hits Radio Northern Ireland Hits Radio Northern Ireland

History
- First air date: 16 March 1976; 50 years ago
- Former frequencies: AM: 1026 kHz

Links
- Webcast: Rayo
- Website: Official Website

Downtown Radio is a Hot Adult Contemporary music radio station based in Belfast, that serves all of Northern Ireland using a network of FM and DAB transmitters.

As of December 2024, the station has a weekly audience of 309,000 listeners according to RAJAR.

== History ==
Former logo

The station, also known as DTR or simply Downtown, began broadcasting on 16 March 1976 - the same day as Prime Minister Harold Wilson resigned. The station had a mini scoop, breaking the news over an hour before BBC Radio Ulster.

Downtown Radio has very much become part of the broadcasting landscape of the entire nine-county province of Ulster. Many of its presenters, such as Trevor 'Big T' Campbell and Candy Devine, are household names.

Initially, Downtown was only contracted to broadcast to the Greater Belfast area, on 1026 kHz AM and 96 MHz (later 97.4 MHz) FM. However, following the collapse of plans for a station in the Derry region (Northside Sound) in 1983, Downtown applied to the former Independent Broadcasting Authority to extend its coverage. Transmitters covering the north west, the Causeway Coast and Fermanagh/South Tyrone were opened in 1986 and 1987 and the station briefly rebranded itself as "DTRFM" to reflect its new audience reach.

The station reverted to Downtown Radio again in 1990 following the introduction of its sister station, Cool FM, although the latter only broadcast on the 97.4 frequency in the Greater Belfast area. Other transmitters remained with Downtown.

New FM transmitters in South Down/Armagh, and Mid and East Antrim opened in the 1990s to improve reception in those areas.

The station has been very highly regarded in the past for its news output, and was a regular stop-off point for radio journalists covering The Troubles in Northern Ireland over a 30-year period. It was the first radio station in Ireland to offer hourly news bulletins. Changes in management made in 2007, as well as the success of the peace process, have led to Downtown reducing its news output somewhat.

It is notable for being one of the few Independent Local Radio stations to still cater for minority tastes such as gospel and jazz. The country music programmes broadcast several times a week and were among Downtown's highest listenership ratings.

In December 2012, Downtown opened a small studio in Derry ahead of the city’s year of being UK City of Culture, situated in the Food Quarter within Foyleside Shopping Centre. It remained open until September 2025, though was mainly only utilised at the weekend with presenter-led programming on Saturday afternoon and Sunday covering a range of events in the region.

On 12 November 2023, it was announced that the station would stop broadcasting on medium wave (AM) before the end of the year. AM programming ceased on 7 December 2023.

== Frequencies ==
- 96.4 MHz: Ballycastle, Ballymoney, Coleraine, Dungiven, Limavady, Portrush, Portstewart
- 96.6 MHz: Dungannon, Enniskillen, Omagh
- 97.1 MHz: Larne (East Antrim)
- 102.3 MHz: Antrim, Ballymena, Clough Mills, Magherafelt, Randalstown, Rasharkin, Templepatrick
- 102.4 MHz: Derry, Strabane
- 103.1 MHz: Armagh, Newry
- 103.4 MHz: Newcastle (Mourne)
- 103.4 MHz: (from Carnmoney Hill): Belfast, Newtownabbey, Holywood, Carrickfergus

== Presenters ==
- Gary Myles
- Owen Larkin
- Glen Pavis
- Declan Wilson
- Paul Orr
- Neal McClelland
- Kirstie McMurray

== Notable past presenters ==
Past presenters include

- Eamonn Holmes
- Frank Mitchell.
- Ivan Martin
- Richard Young
- Johnny Hero
- Jerry Lang
- Maurice Jay
- Trevor Campbell (Big T)
- Candy Devine
- John Daly
- Kenny Tosh
- George Jones
- John Greer
