= NVTV =

- Country: United Kingdom
- Broadcast area: Belfast

Programming
- Picture format: 576i (16:9 SDTV)

Ownership
- Owner: Northern Visions Ltd

History
- Launched: 9 February 2004 (original); 29 September 2014 (relaunch)
- Closed: 24 October 2012 (original); 23 April 2025 (That's TV takeover)

Links
- Website: www.nvtv.co.uk

Availability

Terrestrial
- Freeview: Channel 7

Northern Visions is a community media group in the city of Belfast, and the organisation who used to run the NVTV television station in that city.

== Northern Visions ==
Northern Visions was established in 1986 as a Channel 4 franchised workshop under the ACTT Workshop Agreement, with a strong emphasis on inclusion and the value of bringing communities together to meet a common goal. It was the first local "production company" in Northern Ireland to be awarded a Channel Four commission, one of a number of documentaries in the years that followed that went on to be broadcast by other European broadcasters, ZDF, RAI and ARTE and to win awards. Documentaries were also broadcast in Australia and America.

The organisation was an integral part of the Film & Video Workshop Movement, which comprised groups with united passions for film, politics and a polemical critique of metropolitan, industrial hegemony and unbalanced forms of media representation. It worked as a collective providing facilities to other people for training or educational purposes, outside the realms of their creative production work.

The ACTT Workshop Declaration was a ground-breaking agreement promulgated by the ACTT (now BECTU) in 1982, in consultation with the English Regional Arts Associations, the Welsh Arts Council, Channel Four and the BFI, recognising the alternative practices of the 'workshops' and constituting them to encourage a cultural, social and political contribution to society. The declaration was a radical step for a traditionally closed-shop union, and established working practices in the non-profit, cultural sector. Groups of four or more full-time members whose funding derived from public sources and who engaged in non-commercial work on a not-for-profit basis were enfranchised by the ACTT and given a condition to grant aid for a period of 1, 2 or 3 years, freeing them from 'the tyranny of continually searching for insecure short time funding from arts organisations. Of immediate significance was that the ACTT placed the cultural and political ideologies of its new membership before wage concerns in allowing the groups to operate on an egalitarian minimum wage structure. The recognition of cross-grade practice also allowed filmworkers to gain experience in a range of roles and stipulated that the group and not the commissioner would own sole copyright to the work.

In the late 1990s, the organisation decided to move away from programming for national broadcasters to develop local community distribution platforms and opportunities for communities at disadvantage in Northern Ireland. In 2002, they were one of fifteen groups selected by the Radio Authority to take part in the Access Radio pilot scheme, running during 2002/2003. The aim of the project was to inform the future regulator – Ofcom (Office of Communications) – whether Access Radio, a new tier of not-for-profit radio, was a viable concept and, if it was to be introduced in the future, how it might be licensed, regulated, funded, promoted and organised. In March 2003, a full evaluation of the project New Voices by Anthony Everitt, an independent evaluator, was published. In September 2003, Ofcom announced that it had decided to extend the period of the pilot scheme for, what it now refers to as, 'Community Radio', for a further year, until 31 December 2004. This pilot led to a new tier of community broadcasting in the UK, when community radio stations were recognised as a distinct third tier of radio, alongside BBC Radio and commercial radio, in the Communications Act 2003.

Following a loophole in legislation, Northern Visions joined with the Institute of Local Television, to lobby for local public service television on Freeview in the UK in 2003. They were joined by a number of advocates including the Community Media Association in Sheffield and Oxford local television (now That's Oxford), Somerset Film & Video and Channel 7 (now Estuary TV). In 2011, the Conservative-led government published its Framework for Local TV. This created the opportunity for local TV licences to be awarded through a competitive selection process run by Ofcom to broadcast targeted and relevant local content including news, current affairs and entertainment programmes.

Northern Visions moved into its present building in 2004 in the Cathedral Quarter in Belfast, and established an arts and digital media centre, principally to work with groups involved in the arts, culture and local heritage, media literacy and education, community development, urban regeneration and community relations. The vision is of a democratised form of media where new technologies are utilised as a tool for expression and creativity, to effect social change and combat poverty, social exclusion and isolation.

The organisation has a strong community arts ethos. It has championed access and participation in the arts and has formulated new ways of making films and digital content with local communities throughout its history as an organisation. Its film Our Words Jump to Life, broadcast in 1988, was the first time an Irish film made through community arts practice was broadcast on national television. This was notable as the closed shop dominated the film and television industry at that time. The film went on to win several awards, including the Celtic Film Festival, toured Australia and was picked up for broadcast by European television stations.

The organisation has one of the largest repositories of community film archives in Ireland. Its collections are currently being digitised and made available online. As well as archives dating from the 1970s, the organisation has a special collection of archives of social life in Northern Ireland from the 1930s.

== NVTV ==
NVTV, standing for Northern Visions Television, was a local community television station operated by the Northern Visions media and arts project, and although some staff are employed by the station, most involved are volunteers. By the time the licence was handed over to That's TV in 2025, NVTV was the only local community station in Northern Ireland.

=== History ===
The station was launched on 9 February 2004, with the first programme aired being a film called The School Trip, which was made by students at the Fleming Fulton School in the city. Initially NVTV broadcast just one hour of programming on weekdays which was repeated on loop, with shows repeated again at the weekend; however, the station expanded its content and covers community and other events in and around the Belfast metropolitan area, as well as other commissioned programmes. Alongside several ongoing 'community' programmes, the mainstay of regular, weekly shows included The Artery, created and filmed by an independent director, Royce Harper from the station's inception to late 2007. This was a 45-minute arts, culture and music magazine style show that won a sizeable production award in 2006 from The Northern Ireland Film & Television Commission (now NI Screen). Over 100 episodes were produced and aired on NVTV. The Artery was then further screened by Dublin Community Television, DCTV in ROI. The analogue signal was broadcast on UHF channel 62 (799.276 MHz), although coverage in Belfast was poor, as it was out of group on many receiving aerials.

NVTV was originally granted a four-year restricted television service licence by the Independent Television Commission, and is operated by the long established, non-profit Northern Visions media and arts centre in the Cathedral Quarter of the city. The station's facilities are used by 200 community-based organisations, as well as a range of individual actors and filmmakers.

NVTV's analogue transmissions ceased in October 2012 during the digital switchover; however, it continued to stream its programming online. On 10 October 2012, the channel was granted a 12-year local TV licence to broadcast on digital terrestrial television by Ofcom. The channel was relaunched on 29 September 2014 through the Freeview and Virgin Media platforms. It is currently licensed to transmit on UHF Channel 30 (Freeview LCN 7). The station's coverage has improved significantly since the digital switchover.

In April 2025, the licence to run the television station was transferred to That's TV, with provision made for Northern Visions' community programming to be included in the schedule.

== Programming ==
NVTV broadcasts from 5 pm to midnight, seven days a week. Local news is broadcast at 7:15 pm and 10:15 pm in a half-hour programme, Focal Point, Monday–Friday, with a Focal Point Round Up at the weekends. There are several regular shows, including Alan in Belfast (chat show), Collapse the Box (arts programming), Banterflix (movie reviews) and Discover the Archives (heritage and history shows). NVTV broadcasts Ulster-Scots and Irish language programming. NVTV also shares content with other local TV stations in Britain, including Latest TV in Brighton and shows from Brighton and Hove have been featured on NVTV also. It shares programming with Cork Community Television.

=== 2004 programming ===
Broadcast began on 9 February 2004 with Welcome to NVTV.

Wednesday 1 December

Tales from the City (46 minutes)

Street Scene – Making the Invisible Visible (9 minutes)

Continuous Time (32 minutes)

Thursday 2 December

Live in Belfast – Iain Archer (40 minutes)

Divine Issues (17 minutes)

Business as Usual (50 minutes)

Friday 3 December

The Insider – "Shankill: The undiscovered Country" (30 minutes)

The Artery (40 minutes)

Monday 6 December

Save the Arts (50 minutes)

Turning the Tide (26 minutes)

Control Freaks (24 minutes)

A Million Bricks (90 minutes)

Wednesday 8 December

The Arts Council's 10th Birthday Lottery Celebration (24 minutes)

The Book Show (15 minutes)

Open Up - Dublin's Temple Bar (30 minutes)

Thursday 9 December

Interview with Michael Buerk (30 minutes)

Conflict: The Irish at War (22 minutes)

In Focus – In tune with Dr. Finbar (25 minutes)

Friday 10 December

Ballyhackamore – "Town of the big horses" (30 minutes)

The Artery (40 minutes)

Monday 13 December

Donegall Quay (17 minutes)

Cinemagic (10 minutes)

Philomena Begley (50 minutes)

Tuesday 14 December

Divine Issues (29 minutes)

Control Freaks (24 minutes)

The Book Show (10 minutes)

Wednesday 15 December

Crumlin Road Gaol (59 minutes)

Open Up - Dublin's Temple Bar (30 minutes)

Thursday 16 December

East Belfast Lantern Parade 2004 (30 minutes)

Martin Gale Exhibition (20 minutes)

Pitch Idol (20 minutes)

Friday 17 December

St Matthew's Primary School Fruit Coop (30 minutes)

The Artery (40 minutes)

Monday 20 December

People Talking About ….

Blazin' Squad (33 minutes)

People Talking About ….

The Nativity – What the Donkey Saw (30 minutes)

Open Up - Dublin's Temple Bar (30 minutes)

Tuesday 21 December

BelFEST (31 minutes)

Control Freaks (24 minutes)

- Holiday Repeat Special*

Quality Control (40 minutes)

Wednesday 22 December

The Art of the Garden (12 minutes)

People Talking About ….

No Excuses (33 minutes)

- Holiday Repeat Special*

Michael Baker (20 minutes)

Thursday 23 December

Tales from the City (45 minutes)

People Talking About ….

The Robin & Tina Show (40 minutes)

Friday 24 December

- Holiday Repeat Special*

The Insider - "Secret History"

Curio (11.5 minutes)

People Talking About ….

The Artery (40 minutes)

Monday 27 December

- Holiday Repeat Special*

West Belfast Talks Back (1 hour 40 minutes)

- Holiday Repeat Special*

Belfast Marathon 2004 (9 minutes)

Summer Jets (5 minutes)

People Talking About …. (2 minutes)

Belfast Cathedral Centenary 1904 - 2004 (15 minutes 24s)

Tuesday 28 December

- Holiday Repeat*

Red Bull Flug Tag (45 minutes)

Belfast Cathedral Centenary 1904 - 2004 (14 minutes 34s)

- Holiday Repeat - Donegall Road Special*

Windsor Women's Centre - From "Orr to Ayr" (15 minutes)

- Holiday Repeat - Donegall Road Special*

A Tale of Two Villages (17 minutes)

- Holiday Repeat - Donegall Road Special*

Three Generations (30 minutes)

Belfast Cathedral Centenary 1904 - 2004 (9 minutes 22s)

Wednesday 29 December

- Holiday Repeat Special*

The 'Jeanie Johnston' (60 minutes)

Belfast Cathedral Centenary 1904 - 2004 (12 minutes 57s)

- Holiday Repeat Special*

A Different Kind Of Beautiful (30 minutes)

Thursday 30 December

Belfast Cathedral Centenary 1904 - 2004 (16 minutes 35s)

- Holiday Repeat Special*

Director's cut of Festival of Fools (30 minutes)

Friday 31 December

Belfast Cathedral Centenary 1904 - 2004 (12 minutes 22s)

- Holiday Repeat Special*

The Insider - Exposing the secret world of fitness fanatics… (60 minutes)

Belfast Cathedral Centenary 1904 - 2004 (14 minutes 8s)

- Holiday Repeat Special*

Titanic at Home (40 minutes)

== See also ==
- List of television stations in the United Kingdom
- Local television in the United Kingdom
