= BBC Two Northern Ireland =

Television station operated by BBC Northern Ireland

- Logo used since 2021.
- Country: United Kingdom
- Broadcast area: Northern Ireland; Republic of Ireland
- Network: BBC Two

Programming
- Languages: English (Ulster English); Irish; Ulster Scots
- Picture format: 576i (16:9 SDTV); 1080i (HDTV)

Ownership
- Owner: BBC Northern Ireland
- Sister channels: BBC One Northern Ireland

History
- Launched: 11 June 1966; 60 years ago 30 March 2001; 25 years ago (digital version)
- Replaced: BBC Choice Northern Ireland (digital version)
- Closed: 28 October 2006; 19 years ago (digital version)

Availability

Terrestrial
- Freeview: Channel 2 Channel 102 (HD)

BBC Two Northern Ireland is a Northern Irish free-to-air television channel owned and operated by BBC Northern Ireland as a variation of the BBC Two network. It is broadcast via digital terrestrial transmitters and from the SES Astra 2E satellite (transponder 48) at the 28.2° East orbital position.

== History ==
The channel's digital feed launched on 30 April 2001, a month after the closure of BBC Choice Northern Ireland.

== Presentation ==
BBC Two Northern Ireland logo used from 2007 until 2021.

The channel was branded onscreen as 'BBC Two NI' from October 2006 until February 2007, though not referred to as such by continuity announcers. Unique idents for Northern Ireland featuring the robotic figure 2 were used during this time, showing the Giant's Causeway and the feature eating an Ulster Fry.

== Programming ==
Unlike BBC Two in the rest of the UK, the channel broadcasts regular news and regional weather updates between programmes. Programmes on the service have included the following:

- The Children's
- First Stop
- Hearts and Minds
- The John Daly Show
- BBC Sport NI at the Milk Cup
- Sky High
- Chasing the Dollar
- Spotlight

=== Children's programmes ===
- Sesame Tree (Originated from BBC Northern Ireland)
- Pingu (Originated from the BBC)
- What's New, Scooby-Doo? (US import from Cartoon Network)
- Shaun the Sheep (From sister network CBBC)
- Bernard (South Korea import from EBS)
- Brum (Originated from the BBC)
- Teletubbies (Originated from the BBC)
- Arthur (US import from PBS)
- The Simpsons (US import from FOX)
- Charlie and Lola (From sister network CBeebies)
- Barnaby Bear (Also known as Colargol)

== Availability ==
BBC Two Northern Ireland can be seen on all television platforms on channel 2, or 102 in Northern Ireland, depending on the system and in other areas of the UK via satellite and on some other digital television platforms and in most areas of the Republic of Ireland on satellite, cable and some other digital television receivers. Programming shown on BBC Two Northern Ireland can be watched again across the UK after transmission on the BBC iPlayer service.

Until 28 October 2006, there were two separate services – 'BBC Two Northern Ireland"', an analogue-only service, referred to as "BBC Two", both in idents and continuity, and a digital-only opt-out, 'BBC Two NI', (the successor to BBC Choice Northern Ireland) which carried extra regional programming and continuity between 6pm and midnight. This has all now ended and the two Northern Ireland services have been merged.
