= UTV (TV channel) =

Television channel in Northern Ireland

- Logo used since 2016

- Country: United Kingdom
- Broadcast area: Northern Ireland
- Network: ITV
- Headquarters: City Quays 2, Belfast, Northern Ireland

Programming
- Language: English
- Picture format: 1080i HDTV; (downscaled to 576i for the SDTV feed)
- Timeshift service: UTV +1 (Freeview & Virgin Media); ITV1 +1 Granada (Freesat & Sky)

Ownership
- Owner: ITV plc
- Sister channels: ITV2; ITV3; ITV4; ITV Quiz; UTV2 (until 2002); UTV Ireland (until 2017)

History
- Launched: 31 October 1959; 67 years ago (as Ulster Television)
- Replaced by: ITV1 ("UTV" brand used for regional output)
- Former names: Ulster Television; (until 4 June 1993)

Links
- Website: itv.com/utv

Availability

Terrestrial
- Freeview (Northern Ireland only): Channel 3 (SD); Channel 35 (+1); Channel 103 (HD)

Streaming media
- UTV Player until 2016
- ITV Hub (2016–2022): www.itv.com
- ITVX (2022–present): www.itv.com (must be logged in to select correct region)

UTV (formerly Ulster Television, branded on air as ITV1 / UTV since 2020) is the ITV region covering Northern Ireland, ITV subsidiary and the former on-air name of the free-to-air public broadcast television channel serving the area. It is run by ITV plc and is responsible for the regional news service and programmes made principally for the area by the UTV production team. It currently uses the network ITV1 channel with an opt-out service for local advertising and on-air promos for local programming.

The present day TV service, ITV1, is directly descended from the ITV network, which originally consisted of independent regional companies which were once the only commercial TV broadcasters in their area. UTV held the licence for Northern Ireland and first went on the air on 31 October 1959.

The company itself was formed in November 1958 to apply for the licence – advertised by the Independent Television Authority – and became the first indigenous television broadcaster in Ireland. The company later diversified and the UTV television operation was sold by parent UTV Media plc (now known as Wireless Group and part of News UK) to ITV plc in February 2016.

== History ==
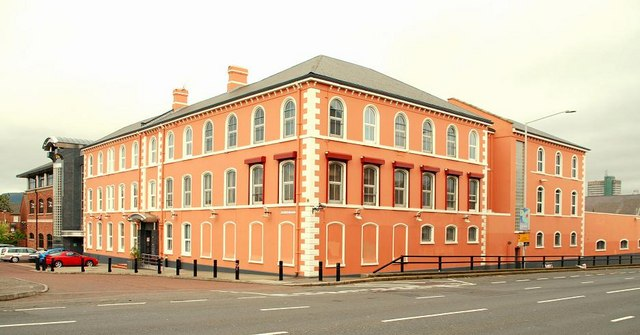
Former UTV HQ, Havelock House

In 1953, the BBC began its first television broadcasts in Northern Ireland, from a temporary relay transmitter in Glencairn that was hastily set up in time for the coronation of Elizabeth II. The following year, the UK Parliament passed the Television Act of 1954, which led to the launch of the country's first commercial television broadcaster, ITV (and subsequently, the beginning of commercial television broadcasts in the United Kingdom). On 2 September 1958, the ITA began searching for companies and entities interested in operating an ITV franchise for Northern Ireland. Among the candidates for the franchise are Associated-Rediffusion and Granada, as well as two consortia - one led by the Duke of Abercorn (Note: Consisting of James Cunningham (then owner and managing director of the now-defunct Northern Whig), George Lodge (owner of the then-standing Belfast Royal Hippodrome and Grand Opera House), and Lawrence Orr (then MP for South Down), with support by the Northern Whig and Belfast Evening Telegraph newspapers.) and the other led by the Earl of Antrim. (Note: Consisting of William MacQuitty (producer of A Night to Remember), Betty Box (sister of Sydney Box, a fellow film producer who, as part of a consortium that founded the Tyne Tees Television license, encouraged MacQuitty to pursue the ITV franchise for Northern Ireland), Francis Evans (then Ambassador of the United Kingdom to Argentina), Bea Lillie, Laurence Olivier, John Rothenstein (then director of the Tate Gallery), and Hubert "Hibbie" Wilmot, with support by the Belfast Newsletter (via the Henderson family) and other local newspapers.) The ITA eventually awarded the franchise to the Antrim consortium on 4 November by having the Whig and Telegraph among the franchise shareholders, while also having sufficient Roman Catholic representation.

With a reluctant MacQuitty as the franchise's founding managing director, the newly-formed group, Ulster Television Limited, set out to launch the new station on Halloween 1959, giving them less than a year to construct facilities and hire needed personnel within a tight budget. The group would purchase Havelock House, then an abandoned linen factory on the Ormeau Road, for £17,000 and convert it into a television studio complex. Instead of providing six hours a week of local programming (including a full news service) within year one (as stipulated in the franchise contract), UTV would do so in stages, with the twenty-minute weekday magazine programme Roundabout being the first local programme to be produced. Ulster Television would sign an affiliation agreement with another broadcaster, ABC Television, to supply the former with programmes and advertising.

=== On air ===
Ulster Television went on air at 4:45pm on 31 October 1959, with Laurence Olivier (then of Henry V, Hamlet, and Richard III fame) being the first person to appear. During its first minutes on air, it featured children engaging in Halloween festivities, an introduction to Northern Ireland "in words and music" by Richard Hayward, and pre-recorded messages from ITV talent. The first programmes to air on Ulster Television are (in order) an episode of The Adventures of Robin Hood, an ITN bulletin, an episode of African Patrol, an episode of Boy Meets Girls (a music programme now wiped), an episode of 77 Sunset Strip, an episode of The Jewel and Warriss Show, another ITN bulletin, a wrestling programme, the 1949 American war film Task Force, and an episode of The Florian Zabach Show. Olivier would then close Ulster Television's inaugural broadcast with an excerpt from Joseph Addison's "The Spacious Firmament". On that night, some residents from Dublin (which falls outside the station's intended broadcast area) called the station to report poor picture reception.

The following evening, UTV aired Rich and Rare, a film consisting of thirty images from across Northern Ireland produced by John Loder (then-Governor of Northern Ireland and Lord Wakehurst), followed by A Shilling for the Evil Day (a play by Irish writer Joseph Tomelty, as part of Armchair Theatre).

At launch, Ulster Television employed a staff of 100 people including six presenters: Ivor Mills and Anne Gregg were chosen as the presenters of local magazine programme Roundabout, Adrienne McGuill, James Greene and Brian Durkin were the first continuity announcers, and former rugby union international Ernest Strathdee was recruited as the station's sports presenter.

Coverage of UTV spread to Western areas of Northern Ireland when the Strabane transmitter opened in February 1963.

=== 1970s–2000s ===
Ulster Television's UHF PAL colour service was launched with the opening of the UHF transmitter Divis in September 1970. This was followed by two additional transmitters at Limavady (opened in 1975) and Brougher Mountain (in 1978). In the early 1980s it broadcast reduced hours when no schools programmes were being broadcast coming on air at 12 noon during the week, and closing down every evening at 23:30 – this remained in place until 1982. In October 1988, the station began 24-hour broadcasting – the last station in the ITV network to do so. UTV was originally scheduled to take a service provided by Central in Birmingham, but a late minute decision to switch to Granada Television's sustaining feed, Night Time, led to a month-long delay. UTV retained its franchise at the 1991 ITV franchise auctions, despite having two opponents.

At the company's annual general meeting in Belfast on 26 May 2006, the registered company name was changed from 'Ulster Television plc' to 'UTV plc'. The company believed that the existing name no longer reflected the full scope of the company's business. In a further change in October 2007, UTV underwent a corporate reorganisation which saw UTV shareholders swap their shares for shares in a new holding company, UTV Media plc, which took over UTV plc's shareholdings in the new media and radio subsidiaries. UTV Ltd. – the original Ulster Television Limited, now a wholly owned subsidiary of UTV Media – returned to being solely the operating company for the ITV franchise.

=== Sale to ITV and end of local continuity ===
On 19 October 2015, UTV Media announced that it would sell its ITV franchise and the UTV brand to ITV plc for £100 million, subject to regulatory approval. The acquisition was finalised the following February. ITV stated that they intended to retain the UTV brand in Northern Ireland.

The former UTV Media group was restructured and rebranded as the Wireless Group, retaining its radio assets until June 2016, when the company was bought by Rupert Murdoch's News Corp. On 11 July 2016, ITV plc announced that was selling the UTV Ireland service to Virgin Media Ireland for €10 million. Virgin Media Ireland was a subsidiary of Liberty Media and had already bought Ireland's TV3 in 2015).

In October 2016, ITV announced plans to close UTV's Havelock House studios. UTV began broadcasting from a new broadcast centre at City Quays 2 in the Belfast Harbour Estate from 1 July 2018.

ITV1 logo, used on-air since 2022 on UTV

Local continuity announcements ended in April 2020, effectively rebranding the channel as ITV in line with all other ITV plc regions. This change was made permanent in November 2020. The ITV channel (including UTV) rebranded as ITV1 in November 2022. The UTV name continues to be used for local programming, notably the news service UTV Live, and in on-air promotions for local non-news programmes.

== Programming ==
UTV's focus has always been on programmes made explicitly for viewers in Northern Ireland, but until the 1990s it also made a number of contributions to the ITV network and Channel 4, many of which were in some way about the province.

=== Current/recent series ===
- UTV Live
- UTV Life
- View from Stormont
- Up Close
- Hidden NI
- Lesser Spotted Ulster
- Lesser Spotted Culture
- Lough Foyle
- The Issue
- The Magazine
- Paul and Nick's Big Food Trip
- Rare Breed: A Farming Year
- RPM
- Ulster Unearthed
- Ultimate Ulster

=== Notable programmes shown on the ITV network ===
- Password (1987–1988)

=== Contributions to series on the ITV network ===
- About Britain
- Comedy Playhouse ("Sailortown"; co-production with Central Television and Carlton Television, 20 April 1993)
- Dramarama ("Undertow of the Armada", 15 June 1987)
- Get Fresh
- Ghost Train
- Highway
- ITV Playhouse ("Boatman Do Not Tarry", 8 July 1968)
- Morning Worship
- Sounds of Britain
- The Time, The Place
- Treasures in Store

=== Notable programmes shown on Channel 4 ===
- The Irish R.M. (co-production with RTÉ; 1983–1985, 3 series)
- Ulster Landscapes (1983)
- Trauma (1983)
- Make It Pay (1983–1985)
- A Seat Among the Stars: The Cinema in Ireland (1984)
- How Does Your Garden Grow? (1986–1992)
- The Last of a Dyin' Race (one-off drama; 1987)
- God's Frontiermen (4-part drama series; 1989)

=== Notable regional programmes ===
- All Mixed Up
- Counterpoint
- Farming Ulster
- (UTV Live) Insight
- Jenny Bristow cookery series
- Kelly
- McGilloway's Way
- McKeever
- School Around the Corner – created by the show's original presenter Paddy Crosbie
- The Seven Thirty Show
- UTV Live Tonight
- UTV School Choir of the Year

=== Regional news programmes ===
- Roundabout (1959–1964)
- Newsview (1964–1969)
- UTV Reports/Reports (1969–1978)
- Good Evening Ulster (1979–1987)
- Six Tonight/Ulster Newstime (1987–1992)
- UTV Live (1993 to date)

== Visual identity and presentation ==
Before ITV branding was introduced in 2020, UTV/Ulster Television used a number of different logos, or idents on-screen over the years.

- 1959 – The station's first on-screen logo was an oscilloscope pattern made up of seven dots joined by six lines. The logo animated to a jingle based on the local folk tune The Mountains of Mourne. According to UTV's website, the original logo was designed as part of a competition, and the winner among over 450 entrants was Mr Roy Irwin of Ballycarry.
- 1970 – With the imminent launch of UHF colour broadcasts, Ulster Television redesigned its first logo – the oscilloscope pattern was retained; but the dots were removed, and the lines were encased in a television-screen shape. Monochrome and colour versions of this ident were produced, the colour using a yellow logo and text on a blue background, which were adopted as the station's colour scheme. UTV's ident at this time did not animate and was not accompanied by a jingle. The logo type introduced on this ident was retained until 1993.
- 1980 – To celebrate their 21st anniversary, UTV commissioned a new ident featuring a model of the station logo embedded on four faces of a cube, coated in silver with a pole skewering the top and bottom of the cube. This model was then filmed on video with a black cloth background as it revolved on a turntable. When it appeared on screen, it was accompanied by a synthesised jingle, and the words "Ulster Television" wiped on screen in yellow text. This ident made its on-screen debut on Halloween Day 1980, and it was used until New Year's Eve 1988.
- 1987 – On 7 September 1987, to coincide with the launch of the station's new evening magazine programme, Six Tonight, a new ident was used to introduce the programme, featuring a computer-animated silver station logo on a blue/green backdrop. After five seconds, the logo faded into the background as the titles of Six Tonight began. This ident, UTV's first attempt at a CGI ident, was later adapted as a temporary station ident in the last few months of 1988, with a video freeze used as the logo sank into the background.
- 1989 – On New Year's Day 1989 a revised computer animation was introduced and the last to feature the oscilloscope logo and the "Ulster Television" name. The ident began with a panning shot over a huge plate with texture to make it look like frost or ice (possibly a white and gray cloudy texture), against a light blue background. Then, an oscilloscope rises out from the plate, and the lines of the oscilloscope pattern are formed with a wipe. In this ident, the lines of the oscilloscope are yellow, with the rest of the logo (the television screen shape) in blue. When the lines are formed, the logo turns and reveals on screen, as a grey banner flies in underneath bearing the words "Ulster Television" and settles underneath the station logo, waving like a flag. This ident was accompanied by a new jingle, and was used until 4 June 1993.

UTV's logo used from 4 June 1993 to 10 December 2000.

- 1993 – At 6pm on 4 June 1993, UTV officially unveiled a new logo. This consisted of an italicised Times Roman capital U forming on screen from different component parts, settling on a blue and yellow plate with "TV" written in italicised red Agency FB Font text. A new jingle was also introduced with a distinct Celtic sound. Since the start of 1993, continuity announcements and trailers referred increasingly to "UTV", and the station's news service was rebranded as UTV Live. With the new logo, the use of "Ulster Television" to identify the station was consigned to history. It also dropped ITV network promotions and introduced locally produced trails.
- 1996 – UTV introduced a new series of idents on 11 November 1996, which showcased scenic locations in Northern Ireland. These include the Giant's Causeway, a waterfall at Glenarriff, and Portaferry harbour. These are supplemented on 12 January 1998 with a set of idents featuring people playing the UTV jingle on various musical instruments. Some of the idents featured UTV personalities. It also dropped live daytime continuity.

UTV's previous logo used from 11 December 2000 to 16 October 2016.

- 2000 – On 1 July 2000, the day when programme presentation and commercials shown on the four main UK television channels switched from the 4:3 aspect ratio to 14:9 on analogue broadcasts and 16:9 on digital broadcasts, UTV refused to adopt the 1999 ITV Hearts look and introduced a new set of idents inspired by the 1989 ITV generic ident featuring a stripe on a black background using footage from the 1996 "landscape" idents, the break filler films used on its short-lived sister channel TV You, and a UTV corporate advertisement where a shoal of fish grouped together to form the 1993 logo. This collection of idents were the first to be created and transmitted in 16:9 aspect ratio, on digital terrestrial and digital cable providers. This was the last set of idents which used the 1993 logo, and they were phased out shortly before Christmas 2000, when a new logo was introduced.
- 2001 – The 1993 logo was later replaced with a similar flatter and wider logo. The "U" is rendered in yellow on a blue oblong, with the "TV" in red on a yellow oblong contained inside the blue oblong. Its first use was in UTV's 2000 Christmas ident, replacing the previous set. On 6 January 2001, a new series of idents shot at various locations across Northern Ireland, including the Silent Valley Reservoir in County Down, Great Victoria Street in Belfast and the Hands Across the Divide sculpture at the Craigavon Bridge, Derry. This was complemented by further idents in 2002 featuring people walking towards the camera and touching the screen with their fingers to make the UTV logo appear.
- 2002 – On 28 October 2002, most of the regional ITV companies adopted a common look with the ITV1 brand replacing the various station logos. This was marked with a series of idents showing actors, presenters and newsreaders associated with ITV appearing in idents. At the same time, UTV decided to adopt these idents, but replaced the ITV logo with their own station logo. The soundtrack used on these idents was identical to those heard on the ITV network versions. This is the nearest that UTV had come to using identical idents to the rest of the ITV network. Around Christmas 2002, UTV broadcast a similar collection of idents showcasing their own presenting talent, shown in addition to the national idents. By early 2003, the network and local celebrity idents were phased out, and a generic ident showing the UTV logo on an animated blue background was used in all junctions.
- 2003 – UTV replaces its network-inspired graphics on 20 November 2003 with a series landscape films of Northern Ireland in their idents, in the form of a panorama shot as the camera revolved around a location. Among the scenes used in this series of UTV idents included the Mourne Mountains, Enniskillen and Lurgan Park. These idents primarily used one of the ident jingles until 3 November 2005, when UTV reprised its 1993–2002 station jingle.
- 2006 – To coincide with the introduction of a new identity across ITV plc stations on Monday 16 January 2006, UTV replaced its 2003 idents with a brand new set. The new idents featured newly recorded films shot across Northern Ireland, again in the form of panoramas. The landscape films used in these idents were updated in July 2007 and October 2008, with the background of each ident changing from black to white in December 2008. Special variations of the UTV idents were used to promote the 2006 North West 200 event, 2006 Special Olympics, the 2007 Rugby World Cup and the UTV Rewind series.
- 2016 – On 17 October 2016, a brand new look was unveiled, aligning the UTV brand more closely with that of the ITV channel. The station idents, based on those used by ITV since a major rebrand in January 2013, included the UTV logo changing colour as it blended in on a live-action scene - a process known as "colour picking".
- 2020 – Since 2 April 2020, UTV has taken full ITV branding and presentation from London including network announcements, idents, promos and end credit sequences. This was initially announced as a temporary measure due to the impact of the COVID-19 pandemic on staff at the Belfast studios. Local continuity was officially abandoned in November 2020 with the departures of the announcing team.

=== Local continuity ===
Until April 2020, UTV was one of two stations in the ITV network – and the only one owned by ITV plc – to have its own continuity announcers.

UTV was also the last company in the network to retain in-vision continuity links, where the duty announcer appeared on-camera to introduce the evening's programmes. In later years, local continuity was generally restricted to evenings with in-vision links presented at weekends by senior announcer Julian Simmons. In 2009, the practice was restored to weekday evenings and presented by the entire announcing team.

Following the sale of UTV, ITV plc transferred most of the station's presentation operations from the Havelock House studios in Belfast to Red Bee Media in Chiswick, which provides playout services for most of ITV's channels.

The last live in-vision announcement was made by Simmons at 11.15 pm on Sunday 16 October 2016, marking the end of 57 years of local transmission.

Two of UTV's longest-serving announcers, Julian Simmons and Gillian Porter, were retained to pre-record out-of-vision continuity – with Aidan Browne providing relief cover – until 2 April 2020, when the channel began taking ITV-branded network presentation as a result of the COVID-19 pandemic.

In November 2020, it was reported the announcing team had left UTV following a decision to switch permanently to network continuity. The last known announcement, voiced by Porter, aired at 5.59 am on Thursday 2 April 2020.

In April 2021, a local voice-over started to be used over the ident before some local programmes. A new bumper with the UTV logo and the tagline "Part of ITV" was also shown for a short time before some – but not all – commercial breaks.

=== Station theme tunes ===
In common with the rest of the ITV Network, the station aired specially composed signature tunes as part of its daily start-up routine. From launch until 1971, the opening theme was Seamus by the American musician, composer and bandleader Van Phillips, who had earlier written the theme tune of the popular 1950s BBC radio science fiction drama Journey into Space. UTV's best-known theme was The Antrim Road, a classical symphony composed by Wayne Hill and Earl Ward, which was used between 1971 and 1983. It originally featured on The British Isles, an LP of orchestral arrangements of traditional and characteristic national tunes of England, Wales, Scotland and Ireland. The album was released on the De Wolf label in 1971.

== HD and timeshift ==
=== ITV1 HD (UTV region) ===
ITV's service for the UTV region is available in HD – like most other ITV regions – but UTV was one of the first stations in the ITV network to offer a full HD simulcast in its days as an independent company.

UTV HD, a simulcast of UTV in high-definition, was launched on Virgin Media on 5 October 2010. It became available on Freeview when the digital switchover took place on 24 October 2012 and on Sky and Freesat on 4 November 2013.

For the first few months, the only true HD content came from the ITV network but after an upgrade local material including adverts started to be played out in HD.

In May 2011, the presentation infrastructure was upgraded to become fully HD-capable in readiness for the digital switchover in 2012.

=== ITV1 +1 (Services offered in Northern Ireland) ===
A delayed version of the full ITV1 service for the UTV region is available on Freeview and Virgin Media.

The timeshift service – branded UTV+1 before the station adopted ITV branding in 2020 – launched at 8pm on 11 January 2011 on Freeview and Virgin Media. UTV +1 however didn't launch on Sky and Freesat until 21 May 2018.

On 13 April 2021, ITV stopped broadcasting UTV +1 on satellite. ITV +1 Granada was added to Sky in Northern Ireland to replace UTV +1.

== UTV 2 ==
UTV 2's final logo

The channel was launched on June 28, 1999, originally named TV You. In 2000, it was rebranded as UTV2. Its programming mainly featured simulcasts with ITV2, which was broadcast in England, Wales, and the Scottish Borders.

Additionally, the channel aired archive programs from UTV. It was free from advertising and eventually closed following a deal with ITV Digital.

== UTV Ireland ==
UTV Ireland's logo (2015–2017)

UTV Ireland was a short-lived sister station to UTV's Northern Ireland service, broadcasting to the Republic of Ireland.

The new channel launched on New Year's Day 2015, following approval by the Broadcasting Authority of Ireland.

UTV Ireland was broadcast from the company's Dublin base at Macken House and carried a large amount of ITV's networked programming (including Emmerdale and Coronation Street, previously broadcast by TV3) alongside some bespoke programming, including Ireland Live, a twice nightly national news programme airing at 5.30 pm and 10 pm.

Ratings and advertising revenue were disappointing which meant the costs of the new station were greater than UTV Media had expected. This played a part in the company's decision to sell the whole television business to ITV plc.

In July 2016, the channel was sold on by ITV to TV3 Group (now known as Virgin Media Television) which then, effectively, closed it.

It was replaced by a substantially new channel called Be3 on 9 January 2017. This new channel was rebranded as Virgin Media Three in August 2018. It focuses on children's and female-orientated programming.

== Explanatory footnotes ==
ITV regional service
New service as Ulster Television	Northern Ireland; 31 October 1959 – present	Current provider as UTV
