= List of Give My Head Peace episodes =

Give My Head Peace is a Northern Irish sitcom created by the Hole in the Wall Gang's Tim McGarry, Damon Quinn and Micheal McDowell, for BBC Northern Ireland. A Hole in the Wall Gang special broadcast in 1995, which is established as a pilot, before it became ongoing from 1998. It officially ended in 2007, but was revived in 2016.

As of 23 December 2024, 99 episodes of Give My Head Peace have aired, including eleven specials, concluding the sixteenth series.

== Series overview ==
Series
Series	Episodes	Originally released	
Series	Episodes	First released	Last released
Pilot		31 August 1995	
1	6	16 January 1998	20 February 1998
2	6	22 May 1998	25 June 1998
Special		18 December 1998	
3	6	25 May 1999	2 July 1999
Special		17 December 1999	
4	8	12 May 2000	30 June 2000
Special		21 December 2000	
5	6	25 May 2001	29 June 2001
6	6	23 November 2001	28 December 2001
7	6	17 May 2002	21 June 2002
8	6	22 November 2002	27 December 2002
9	6	28 November 2003	2 January 2004
10	10	26 November 2004	11 February 2005
Special		23 December 2005	
Special		18 April 2006	
Special		22 December 2006	
Special		28 December 2007	
Special		28 December 2016	
11	3	19 January 2018	2 February 2018
Special		27 December 2018	
Special		27 December 2019	
12	3	30 December 2019	17 January 2020
13	4	27 December 2020	29 January 2021
14	4	27 December 2021	21 January 2022
15	4	26 December 2022	20 January 2023
16	4	28 December 2023	19 January 2024
Special		23 December 2024	

== Episodes ==
=== Pilot (1995) ===
Title	Directed by	Written by	Original release date
"Two Ceasefires and a Wedding"	Stephen Butcher	Michael McDowell, Tim McGarry, Nuala Mckeever, Damon Quinn and Martin Reid	31 August 1995
Set in August 1994 the episode is about the ceasefire and a love across the barricade romance involving Billy and Emer and Da and uncle Andy aren't a bit happy

=== Series 1 (1998) ===
No. overall	No. in series	Title	Directed by	Written by	Original release date
1	1	"The Long Marching Season"	Martin Shardlow	Tim McGarry, Damon Quinn and Michael McDowell	16 January 1998
2	2	"Setting an Example"	Martin Shardlow	Tim McGarry, Damon Quinn and Michael McDowell	28 January 1998
3	3	"Hollywood On The Falls"	Martin Shardlow	Tim McGarry, Damon Quinn and Michael McDowell	30 January 1998
4	4	"Red Hand Luke"	Martin Shardlow	Tim McGarry, Damon Quinn and Michael McDowell	6 February 1998
5	5	"Give Peace a Chance"	Martin Shardlow	Tim McGarry, Damon Quinn and Michael McDowell	13 February 1998
6	6	"The Peace Dividend"	Martin Shardlow	Tim McGarry, Damon Quinn and Michael McDowell	20 February 1998

=== Series 2 (1998) ===
No. overall	No. in series	Title	Directed by	Written by	Original release date
7	1	"The Importance of Being Protestant"	Martin Shardlow	Tim McGarry, Damon Quinn and Michael McDowell	22 May 1998
8	2	"Shadow of a Salesman"	Martin Shardlow	Tim McGarry, Damon Quinn and Michael McDowell	29 May 1998
9	3	"Allo Allo Allo"	Martin Shardlow	Tim McGarry, Damon Quinn and Michael McDowell	5 June 1998
10	4	"An Indecent Proposal"	Martin Shardlow	Tim McGarry, Damon Quinn and Michael McDowell	12 June 1998
11	5	"A Guest of the Nation"	Martin Shardlow	Tim McGarry, Damon Quinn and Michael McDowell	19 June 1998
12	6	"Sectarian Candidate"	Martin Shardlow	Tim McGarry, Damon Quinn and Michael McDowell	25 June 1998
Da And Uncle Andy go head to head and in Order to get votes they sabotage each other

=== Christmas Special (1998) ===
No. overall	Title	Directed by	Written by	Original release date
13	"It's a Horrible Life"	Martin Shardlow	Tim McGarry, Damon Quinn and Michael McDowell	18 December 1998
In this Christmas special Da and uncle Andy seem to have lost the Christmas spirit and they with them both wishing they weren't born get visited by their guardian Angel who shows them what it would be like if they hadn't have been born

=== Series 3 (1999) ===
No. overall	No. in series	Title	Directed by	Written by	Original release date
14	1	"A Landrover Named Desire"	Martin Shardlow	Tim McGarry, Damon Quinn and Michael McDowell	25 May 1999
15	2	"The Boxer"	Martin Shardlow	Tim McGarry, Damon Quinn and Michael McDowell	4 June 1999
16	3	"Saving Ryan's Daughter"	Martin Shardlow	Tim McGarry, Damon Quinn and Michael McDowell	11 June 1999
17	4	"Due North and South"	Martin Shardlow	Tim McGarry, Damon Quinn and Michael McDowell	18 June 1999
18	5	"Desperately Seeking Dympna"	Martin Shardlow	Tim McGarry, Damon Quinn and Michael McDowell	25 June 1999
19	6	"Bonfire of the insanities"	Martin Shardlow	Tim McGarry, Damon Quinn and Michael McDowell	2 July 1999

=== Christmas Special (1999) ===
No. overall	Title	Directed by	Written by	Original release date
20	"Wish You Weren't Here"	Martin Shardlow	Tim McGarry, Damon Quinn and Michael McDowell	17 December 1999
45 minute Christmas special.

=== Series 4 (2000) ===
No. overall	No. in series	Title	Directed by	Written by	Original release date
21	1	"Truly, Madly, Deadly"	Martin Shardlow	Tim McGarry, Damon Quinn and Michael McDowell	12 May 2000
22	2	"Andy's Ashes"	Martin Shardlow	Tim McGarry, Damon Quinn and Michael McDowell	21 May 2000
23	3	"Fame"	David G. Croft	Tim McGarry, Damon Quinn and Michael McDowell	26 May 2000
24	4	"Secrets and Lies"	David G. Croft	Tim McGarry, Damon Quinn and Michael McDowell	2 June 2000
25	5	"The Importance of Being Honest"	David G. Croft	Tim McGarry, Damon Quinn and Michael McDowell	9 June 2000
26	6	"A Farewell To Arms"	Martin Shardlow	Tim McGarry, Damon Quinn and Michael McDowell	16 June 2000
27	7	"Death in Divis"	David G. Croft	Tim McGarry, Damon Quinn and Michael McDowell	23 June 2000
28	8	"Reborn on the Twelfth of July"	David G. Croft	Tim McGarry, Damon Quinn and Michael McDowell	30 June 2000

=== Christmas Special (2000) ===
No. overall	Title	Directed by	Written by	Original release date
29	"A Fairytale of New York"	David G. Croft	Tim McGarry, Damon Quinn and Michael McDowell	21 December 2000

=== Series 5 (2001) ===
No. overall	No. in series	Title	Directed by	Written by	Original release date
30	1	"The Talentless Mr Ripple"	Tom Poole	Tim McGarry, Damon Quinn and Michael McDowell	25 May 2001
31	2	"Number One Fan"	Tom Poole	Tim McGarry, Damon Quinn and Michael McDowell	1 June 2001
32	3	"The North Down Connection"	Tom Poole	Tim McGarry, Damon Quinn and Michael McDowell	8 June 2001
33	4	"McKenna's Gold"	Michael McDowell and Tom Poole	Tim McGarry, Damon Quinn and Michael McDowell	15 June 2001
34	5	"Luke Back In Anger"	Tom Poole	Tim McGarry, Damon Quinn and Michael McDowell	22 June 2001
35	6	"The Beautiful Game"	Tom Poole	Tim McGarry, Damon Quinn and Michael McDowell	29 June 2001

=== Series 6 (2001) ===
No. overall	No. in series	Title	Directed by	Written by	Original release date
36	1	"A Day in the Life"	Tom Poole	Tim McGarry, Damon Quinn and Michael McDowell	23 November 2001
37	2	"Seven"	Tom Poole and Michael McDowell	Tim McGarry, Damon Quinn and Michael McDowell	30 November 2001
38	3	"Intiminadation"	Tom Poole	Tim McGarry, Damon Quinn and Michael McDowell	7 December 2001
39	4	"The Drugs Don't Work"	Tom Poole	Tim McGarry, Damon Quinn and Michael McDowell	14 December 2001
40	5	"A Christmas Carol"	Tom Poole	Tim McGarry, Damon Quinn and Michael McDowell	21 December 2001
41	6	"The Shoes of the Fisherman"	Tom Poole	Tim McGarry, Damon Quinn and Michael McDowell	28 December 2001

=== Series 7 (2002) ===
No. overall	No. in series	Title	Directed by	Written by	Original release date
42	1	"Don't Go Up There"	Tom Poole	Tim McGarry, Damon Quinn and Michael McDowell	17 May 2002
43	2	"The Prime of The Inspector Brodie"	Tom Poole	Tim McGarry, Damon Quinn and Michael McDowell	24 May 2002
44	3	"Get Thee to a Nunnery"	Tom Poole	Tim McGarry, Damon Quinn and Michael McDowell	31 May 2002
45	4	"I Have a Dream"	Tom Poole	Tim McGarry, Damon Quinn and Michael McDowell	7 June 2002
46	5	"La Passionara"	Tom Poole	Tim McGarry, Damon Quinn and Michael McDowell	14 June 2002
47	6	"Lord of the Ring"	Tom Poole	Tim McGarry, Damon Quinn and Michael McDowell	21 June 2002

=== Series 8 (2002) ===
No. overall	No. in series	Title	Directed by	Written by	Original release date
48	1	"Village People"	Tom Poole	Tim McGarry, Damon Quinn and Michael McDowell	22 November 2002
49	2	"Friends"	Michael McDowell	Tim McGarry, Damon Quinn and Michael McDowell	29 November 2002
50	3	"In the Name of the Father"	Tom Poole	Tim McGarry, Damon Quinn and Michael McDowell	6 December 2002
51	4	"Return of the Native"	Tom Poole	Tim McGarry, Damon Quinn and Michael McDowell	13 December 2002
52	5	"Crime and Punishment"	Tom Poole	Tim McGarry, Damon Quinn and Michael McDowell	20 December 2002
53	6	"Secondary Colours"	Tom Poole	Tim McGarry, Damon Quinn and Michael McDowell	27 December 2002
According to the BBC this episode marks the 50th episode. It is the 53rd episode overall, including the three Christmas specials.

=== Series 9 (2003–2004) ===
No. overall	No. in series	Title	Directed by	Written by	Original release date
54	1	"The Producers"	Michael McDowell	Tim McGarry, Damon Quinn and Michael McDowell	28 November 2003
55	2	"Return of the Mummy"	Michael McDowell	Tim McGarry, Damon Quinn and Michael McDowell	5 December 2003
56	3	"It Must Be Love"	Tom Poole	Tim McGarry, Damon Quinn and Michael McDowell	12 December 2003
57	4	"The Sixth Sense"	Tom Poole	Tim McGarry, Damon Quinn and Michael McDowell	19 December 2003
58	5	"The King and I"	Michael McDowell	Tim McGarry, Damon Quinn and Michael McDowell	26 December 2003
59	6	"Shock and Awe"	Tom Poole	Tim McGarry, Damon Quinn and Michael McDowell	2 January 2004

=== Series 10 (2004–2005) ===
No. overall	No. in series	Title	Directed by	Written by	Original release date
60	1	"The Kid"	Michael McDowell	Tim McGarry, Damon Quinn and Michael McDowell	26 November 2004
61	2	"Smoke Gets In Your Eyes"	Michael McDowell	Tim McGarry, Damon Quinn and Michael McDowell	3 December 2004
62	3	"Keep the Aspidistra Flying"	Michael McDowell	Tim McGarry, Damon Quinn and Michael McDowell	10 December 2004
63	4	"The Searchers"	Michael McDowell	Tim McGarry, Damon Quinn and Michael McDowell	17 December 2004
64	5	"I Am the Law"	Michael McDowell	Tim McGarry, Damon Quinn and Michael McDowell	7 January 2005
65	6	"Fahrenheit 451"	Michael McDowell	Tim McGarry, Damon Quinn and Michael McDowell	14 January 2005
66	7	"Surprise, Surprise"	Michael McDowell	Tim McGarry, Damon Quinn and Michael McDowell	21 January 2005
67	8	"Love Actually"	Michael McDowell	Tim McGarry, Damon Quinn and Michael McDowell	28 January 2005
68	9	"Canada Dry"	Michael McDowell	Tim McGarry, Damon Quinn and Michael McDowell	4 February 2005
69	10	"The Passion of Red Hand Luke"	Michael McDowell	Tim McGarry, Damon Quinn and Michael McDowell	11 February 2005

=== Christmas Special (2005) ===
No. overall	Title	Directed by	Written by	Original release date
70	"It Was A Very Good Year"	Michael McDowell	Tim McGarry, Damon Quinn and Michael McDowell	23 December 2005
Christmas special, episode runtime 60 minutes.

=== Easter Special (2006) ===
No. overall	Title	Directed by	Written by	Original release date
71	"Easter Parade"	Michael McDowell	Tim McGarry, Damon Quinn and Michael McDowell	18 April 2006
Easter Special, episode runtime 60 minutes.

=== Christmas Special (2006) ===
No. overall	Title	Directed by	Written by	Original release date
72	"The McGlinchey Code"	Unknown	Tim McGarry, Damon Quinn and Michael McDowell	22 December 2006
Christmas Special.

=== Christmas Special (2007) ===
No. overall	Title	Directed by	Written by	Original release date
73	"The Last Farewell"	Michael McDowell	Tim McGarry, Damon Quinn and Michael McDowell	28 December 2007
Christmas special, episode runtime 60 minutes.

=== Christmas Special (2016) ===
No. overall	Title	Directed by	Written by	Original release date
74	"The Farce Awakens"	Michael McDowell	Tim McGarry, Damon Quinn and Michael McDowell	28 December 2016
Christmas special, episode runtime 60 minutes.

=== Series 11 (2018) ===
No. overall	No. in series	Title	Directed by	Written by	Original release date
75	1	"The New Broom"	Michael McDowell	Tim McGarry, Damon Quinn and Michael McDowell	19 January 2018
76	2	"The Golf War"	Michael McDowell	Tim McGarry, Damon Quinn and Michael McDowell	26 January 2018
77	3	"Sex, Lies and Audiotape"	Michael McDowell	Tim McGarry, Damon Quinn and Michael McDowell	2 February 2018

=== Christmas Special (2018) ===
No. overall	Title	Directed by	Written by	Original release date
78	"Shallow Grave"	Michael McDowell	Tim McGarry, Damon Quinn and Michael McDowell	27 December 2018
Christmas special.

=== Christmas Special (2019) ===
No. overall	Title	Directed by	Written by	Original release date
79	"Stranger things "	Michael McDowell	Tim McGarry, Damon Quinn and Michael McDowell	27 December 2019
Christmas special.

=== Series 12 (2019–2020) ===
No. overall	No. in series	Title	Directed by	Written by	Original release date
80	1	"A Kick Up the Arts"	Michael McDowell	Tim McGarry, Damon Quinn and Michael McDowell	30 December 2019
81	2	"Death Becomes Him"	Michael McDowell	Tim McGarry, Damon Quinn and Michael McDowell	10 January 2020
82	3	"The Derry Girl"	Michael McDowell	Tim McGarry, Damon Quinn and Michael McDowell	17 January 2020

=== Series 13 (2020–2021) ===
No. overall	No. in series	Title	Directed by	Written by	Original release date
83	1	"2020 Vision"	Michael McDowell	Tim McGarry, Damon Quinn and Michael McDowell	27 December 2020
84	2	"Love in the time of coronavirus"	Michael McDowell	Tim McGarry, Damon Quinn and Michael McDowell	15 January 2021
85	3	"Twin Peaks"	Michael McDowell	Tim McGarry, Damon Quinn and Michael McDowell	22 January 2021
86	4	"Kidnapped"	Michael McDowell	Tim McGarry, Damon Quinn and Michael McDowell	29 January 2021

=== Series 14 (2021–2022) ===
No. overall	No. in series	Title	Directed by	Written by	Original release date
87	1	"The vanishing "	Michael McDowell	Tim McGarry, Damon Quinn and Michael McDowell	27 December 2021
88	2	"The Importance of Being Andy "	Michael McDowell	Tim McGarry, Damon Quinn and Michael McDowell	7 January 2022
89	3	"No Country for Older Men "	Michael McDowell	Tim McGarry, Damon Quinn and Michael McDowell	14 January 2022
90	4	"The Orangeman Who Fell to Earth "	Michael McDowell	Tim McGarry, Damon Quinn and Michael McDowell	21 January 2022

=== Series 15 (2022–2023) ===
No. overall	No. in series	Title	Directed by	Written by	Original release date
91	1	"Murder Most Foul "	Michael McDowell	Tim McGarry, Damon Quinn and Michael McDowell	26 December 2022
92	2	"West Belfast "	Michael McDowell	Tim McGarry, Damon Quinn and Michael McDowell	6 January 2023
93	3	"Billy brascon "	Michael McDowell	Tim McGarry, Damon Quinn and Michael McDowell	13 January 2023
94	4	"Baby love "	Michael McDowell	Tim McGarry, Damon Quinn and Michael McDowell	20 January 2023

=== Series 16 (2023–2024) ===
No. overall	No. in series	Title	Directed by	Written by	Original release date
95	1	"Total Christmas "	Michael McDowell	Tim McGarry, Damon Quinn and Michael McDowell	28 December 2023
96	2	"The Other Side "	Michael McDowell	Tim McGarry, Damon Quinn and Michael McDowell	5 January 2024
97	3	"The Dogs in The Street "	Michael McDowell	Tim McGarry, Damon Quinn and Michael McDowell	19 January 2024
98	4	"Sir Da "	Michael McDowell	Tim McGarry, Damon Quinn and Michael McDowell	26 January 2024

=== Christmas Special (2024) ===
No. overall	Title	Directed by	Written by	Original release date
99	"Merry Christmas Mr Begbie"	Michael McDowell	Tim McGarry, Damon Quinn and Michael McDowell	23 December 2024

== Documentaries ==
Title	Directed by	Written by	Original airdate
"The Story of Give My Head Peace"	–	—	28 December 2007
The cast, writers and producers reflect on the journey of the ironic sitcom.
"A Beginner's Guide"	Michael McDowell	—	28 December 2016
A guide to Give My Head Peace with a look back to classic moments and interview with previous cast members.
