= Diona Doherty =

Irish comedian, actress and writer

- Born: 1989 (age 36–37); Derry, Northern Ireland
- Known for: Give My Head Peace; Soft Border Patrol; The Blame Game; A Perforated Ulster
- Spouse: Sean Hegarty (m. 2016)
- Children: 2

Diona Doherty (born 1989) is an Irish comedian, actress and writer from Derry. She starred in BBC Northern Ireland's Soft Border Patrol. She played a Ukrainian student in an episode of Channel 4's Derry Girls. She has been a panellist on The Blame Game since 2021.

== Career ==
Doherty has frequently worked with Hole in the Wall Gang, as a writer and member of the cast of BBC Radio Ulster's satirical sketch show A Perforated Ulster since 2020, working with Tim McGarry on The Blame Game since 2021, a regular role of Derry girl Gráinne in Give My Head Peace, and a member of the revamped Dry Your Eyes cast in 2022. She competed in 2021's BBC New Comedy Award, making it to the Northern Ireland final. She appeared in series 3 of Blue Lights. In 2027, Doherty will play Julie Johnston in the upcoming comedy Committed.

== Personal life ==
Doherty is married to Irish comic Sean Hegarty. They have a daughter, Winter, born in 2021 and a son, Rocky, who was born in 2023. and Hegarty has children from a previous relationship.
