= Give My Head Peace =

- Title card (2016 special)
- Created by: Tim McGarry; Damon Quinn; Michael McDowell
- Written by: Tim McGarry; Damon Quinn; Michael McDowell
- Starring: Tim McGarry; Damon Quinn; Michael McDowell; Martin Reid; Olivia Nash; BJ Hogg (S1-12); Nuala McKeever (S1–2); Alexandra Ford
- Country of origin: United Kingdom
- No. of series: 16
- No. of episodes: 99 (incl. specials) (list of episodes)

Production
- Running time: 30–40 minutes

Original release
- Network: BBC Northern Ireland
- Release: 31 August 1995 (pilot)
- Release: 16 January 1998 – 28 December 2007
- Release: 28 December 2016 – 19 January 2024

Give My Head Peace is a satirical television comedy series on BBC Northern Ireland that pokes fun at political parties, paramilitary groups and the sectarian divide in Northern Ireland. The programme is written by Tim McGarry, Damon Quinn and Michael McDowell, also known as "The Hole in the Wall Gang", who also perform as the characters. Episodes are recorded in front of a live studio audience at the BBC Blackstaff Studio A in Belfast.

The Show was cancelled by the BBC in October 2026.

== Background ==
The concept originated on BBC Radio Ulster music programme Across The Line in the late 1980s, as a five-minute slot. The radio version used many of the characters and plot ideas used in the later TV series.

=== Pilot: Two Ceasefires and a Wedding ===
Its first TV appearance was in a made-for-TV film called Two Ceasefires and a Wedding, shown on BBC Northern Ireland (31 August 1995), poking fun at the clichéd "love across the barricades" plot that features in many dramas about Northern Ireland. In this case the lovers were Emer, the daughter of a "prominent" Sinn Féin activist, and Billy, an RUC constable. Their wedding is opposed by their respective families, and ends in farce, although Billy and Emer were happily married.

In the pilot episode, Ma & Da have a second son, Paul, who suffers anxiety from being wrongly imprisoned for one of Da's failed missions in England. He is best man at Billy & Emer's wedding. He only appears in one episode in the main series.

=== Main series ===
A full series was then commissioned by BBC Northern Ireland. Some changes were made to the format prior to the series going ahead – with the character of Cal (Emer's brother) changing substantially, and the introduction of other recurring characters such as Big Mervyn and Red Hand Luke. A few years into the series, Nuala McKeever (Emer) left the series to pursue other interests, and a new love interest for Billy was introduced in the form of Emer's previously unseen sister, Dympna.

The series continued to run on BBC One NI until 2005, taking a hiatus as the Hole in the Wall Gang began work on a new series called Dry Your Eyes. Give My Head Peace usually screened in a prime-time Friday night slot, opting out from network BBC One. In mid-2004, a selection of episodes were shown across the UK on BBC Two in a late-night slot during weekends.

The 50th episode, entitled "Secondary Colours" aired on 27 December 2002. (Note: "Secondary Colours" actually marks the 53rd episode overall, with the three previous Christmas Specials included.)

=== Cancellation ===
The final Give My Head Peace episode was transmitted on BBC One Northern Ireland on 28 December 2007. This was supposed to be the last ever episode but during the final few seconds, a graphic stating "That's All Folks?" appeared, suggesting that the show could return in the future. According to Tim McGarry, the reason for the show's cancellation was due to a mis-sent email, received by a BBC executive in charge of the show's production. Allegedly, McGarry had hit reply rather than forward to the intended recipient.

=== 2016 special and soft reset ===
Give My Head Peace returned for a one-off 40-minute long episode titled "The Farce Awakens" on 28 December 2016 – exactly nine years to the day since it last aired. It was filmed in Northern Ireland in October 2016. Television presenter Christine Lampard made a cameo appearance.

With this special, they overwrite the events of the original final episode. In that episode, Billy kills Uncle Andy and Big Mervyn after learning they had lost Billy's house and money in a scam. While Billy is in custody, Cal's Protestant girlfriend Siobhan is revealed as an undercover police officer trying to get close to Da. When Siobhan tries to kill Da, Ma suspects them of having an affair. This, combined by the knowledge that Da had prevented Liam Neeson from proposing to their daughter Dympna, drives Ma to kill him. Dympna confesses to the murder to spare Ma from prison. Billy is released after being granted a pardon by Ian Paisley and Martin McGuiness. He learns of what happened to his wife Dympna and devotes himself to trying to clear her name, despite now living with two other women. The special now makes these events non-canon.

=== 2018 return ===
The series returned with an eleventh series which began broadcasting on 19 January 2018. This was followed by a Christmas Special called "Shallow Grave" which aired on Thursday 27 December 2018 on BBC One Northern Ireland. The show returned for a Christmas Special in December 2019, as part of the 12th series consisting of four episodes leading into 2020.

The show returned in December 2020 for a Christmas special, to be followed by three other specials in early 2021. Recording of the 2020 Christmas Special and 2021 episodes had to be conducted under strict health guidance due to the Covid-19 pandemic with production moved from their usual location at BBC Blackstaff Studio in the centre of Belfast to a new studio located elsewhere in Northern Ireland to ensure social distancing could be maintained. No studio audience was present for the filming of the episodes, but a virtual audience watched and reacted to the recordings online. The 2020 Christmas special aired on Sunday 27 December 2020 on BBC One Northern Ireland, and saw the cast give a proper send off to the character "Big Mervyn", as the actor who played him BJ Hogg died earlier in 2020. Three more episodes were aired from mid January 2021.

Three more series (of 4 episodes each) were televised in January 2022, January 2023 and January 2024. A Christmas special, "Merry Christmas Mr Begbie" was broadcast in December 2024.

=== Live ===
In recent years, they have performed live shows at a selection of venues across Northern Ireland. The 2004 show was chiefly made up of scripts from the 2004–2005 series. In 2007 a new live show entitled Dry Your Eyes it's Give My Head Peace was held in Derry's Millennium Forum and the Grand Opera House to celebrate ten years of the show. This production showed material from GMHP and Dry Your Eyes and was very well received. The next live show in 2008 followed on from the final television episode, called Give My Head Peace: Back From The Grave, and also featured the Dry Your Eyes characters. In 2009, the gang went on their last tour called "Give My Head Peace: The Final Farewell Tour". However, the show returned on an annual basis with "Give My Head Peace: The Annual Review" touring Northern Ireland. The performance features the show's regulars, with the notable exceptions of Mervyn and Red Hand Luke, and also features a stand-up set from Tim McGarry who plays Da.

Since the show was renewed in 2018, the group have also revived their live shows, with events in the Grand Opera House Belfast, the Riverside Theatre, Coleraine and other venues throughout NI.

In 1999 a Give My Head Peace book was released. The only DVD released to date is of series 6, in November 2009.

== Characters ==
The principal characters are:

- Da (Tim McGarry) – Da is an Irish Catholic who represents a stereotypical Irish nationalist. He is an ardent fan of Irish culture despite having little knowledge of Irish history and being unable to speak a word of Irish. Da is a Sinn Féin spokesman who later becomes an assemblyman, and recently a "retired assemblyman". He is very proud of his involvement and (exaggerated) friendship with Gerry Adams. He is fired repeatedly for embarrassing Gerry or the party publicly. He often gets reinstated after blackmailing Gerry with incriminating evidence, which inevitably gets destroyed through ineptitude. He has a beard and wears glasses to replicate Gerry's appearance, save for three episodes where they had fallen out. Da claims to have been involved with every unlawful activity that Gerry was allegedly involved with. In the original run, he claims he was directly involved with the IRA alongside Gerry, but has since admitted that he wasn't as involved as Gerry was. Da lives in Divis Tower on the Falls Road. He has six adult children with Ma, but only four have ever been seen. It was recently discovered that he was not legally married to Ma, but he is tricked into marrying her again by Cal.
- Cal (Damon Quinn) – Although he is a grown man, he still lives at home and often acts child-like. He supports his father in his self-proclaimed struggle against British imperialism, and usually does what Da tells him, no matter how daft. In the pilot "Two Ceasefires and a Wedding", he is portrayed as a more sinister IRA activist. In the main series, he is much more gentle and slightly dim-witted. He often proves to be naturally talented at most things he tries, but his attempts at being successful are usually scuppered quite quickly. He is jealous of his seldom seen brother Paul. It is stated by Ma on multiple occasions that Cal came "really close" to getting married until Da ruined, but the details keep changing. In later episodes, he becomes increasingly suspicious that Da is siding with the British, and stands up to him when he is mean to Ma.
- Uncle Andy (Martin Reid) – Uncle Andy is an old-fashioned traditional Protestant loyalist whose twin loves are British Ulster and Elvis Presley. He is very argumentative, and determined to take offense at even the slightest suggestion that someone is trying to oppress him. He blames all problems on Catholics and Sinn Fein, and is often abusive towards Dympna for simply being a Catholic and a woman. He often devises elaborate money-making schemes and scams with his best friend Big Mervyn. Their combined lack of intelligence and foresight often cause these plans to fail. In similar respect, he is repeatedly barred from the Loyalist Kneebreakers Social Club or the Orange Order due to his tricks or inappropriate conduct. He used to try to avoid eviction by claiming he was really Billy's father until he himself lost track over whether or not it was a scam. It was eventually confirmed that he isn't. He is "close friends" with Red Hand Luke and Pastor Begbie despite clearly living in fear of them. In most recent episodes, he becomes convinced that Grainne is his daughter from a one night stand with her mother, mainly because Billy said it was confirmed by a DNA test. The truth has yet to be verified.
- Billy (Michael McDowell) – Uncle Andy's nephew and a police officer with the PSNI (formerly RUC). He immediately married Emer after first meeting her in the pilot episode. By the beginning of the first series, it had become a loveless marriage. After Emer leaves with their son, Billy instantly falls in love with Dympna who moves in with him. They are married by the Pope after his divorce is finalised. Billy was raised by Uncle Andy after being abandoned by both parents. There are recurring hints that Uncle Andy is his father until it is eventually verified as untrue. He often assumes "politics" (i.e. he isn't a Catholic) is keeping him from promotions, when in fact he is quite lazy. He eventually gets his promotion for helping investigate the hit-and-run incident that injured Da, even though he committed it. While he openly objects to the criminal acts of Uncle Andy and his associates, Billy isn't above abusing his policing powers for his own advantage.
- Emer (Nuala McKeever) – Emer is Da and Ma's daughter, and marries Billy in the pilot episode. Like Ma, she is uninterested in politics and mean towards Da. However, she is quite intelligent and well informed. She is more interested in fashion and men. So much so that she shamelessly pursues other men despite Billy's protests. It is often said that she has a son with Billy who is never seen. By the beginning of series 2, she has left Billy for a Spaniard, and taken their son with them. They are seldom mentioned again until it is discovered that she remarried, thus making it easier for Billy to have his divorce. He shares a birthday with Cal.
- Ma (Olivia Nash) – Da's cynical and sharp-tongued wife. She tries to be a typical warm-hearted Irish mother, but she quickly gets frustrated with her family. She openly resents Da, who makes fun of her short stature, and she refers to as a "lanky streak of piss". While she keeps wishing ill of her husband, she is hurt any time he takes interest in other women. She is uninterested in politics and finds sectarianism to be dumb. This allows her to be accepting of things and people that Da and Cal are less open to, particularly her protestant in-laws. She has the occasional mild crush on Uncle Andy. Multiple episodes revealed that she has obsessions with various celebrities, but the identity of that person keeps changing (e.g. they have included Daniel O'Donnell and Hugo Duncan). She recently learned that she wasn't legally married to Da, but they did marry after Cal tricked Da into it. She also revealed that she is actually a British citizen by birth, and has only ever had British identification documents, which aggravates Da no end.
- Dympna (Alexandra Ford) – Dympna is one of Ma and Da's daughters, and Emer's younger sister. She replaced Emer as Billy's partner after Emer suddenly leaves. She is just as intelligent as her sister, but becomes increasingly ignorant of politics after becoming a Sinn Fein assemblyperson. An important difference is that Dympna is faithful to Billy, and rejects advances from other men. She is bullied by Uncle Andy for being a Catholic and a woman, but she can also dish it back. Dympna marries Billy in a service conducted by The Pope. It is hinted that she is the biological daughter of Italian Cardinal Vincenzo, but this is never resolved. She has a recurring ambition to become famous despite having no talents.
- Big Mervyn (BJ Hogg) – A burly, leather-wearing loyalist, and Uncle Andy's best mate. Not the brightest, but generally well-liked. He often assists Uncle Andy in his schemes with little objection. He is often used to send bad news to Andy, like when he has been banned from the Loyalist Kneebreakers Social Club, or is in trouble with someone else. It is frequently shown that Mervyn has many talents and is quite popular, but his association with Andy prevents him from prospering. He is frequently asked to recall events from Andy's life on his behalf. Andy sometimes explains that Mervyn chose to remain single due to having never gotten over a past love that went sour. The woman and the events in question change each time this story is told. Hogg was always listed as "guest starring" despite appearing in every episode filmed before his death. In the 2020 series, it was acknowledged that Mervyn had died.
- Pastor Begbie (Paddy Jenkins) – Paster Begbie appeared as recurring character late into the original run, but has since become a main character. He is a Presbyterian Minister and leader of the local chapter of the UDA. He is also involved with organised crime and makes no secret of it. Begbie has been friends with Andy and Mervyn since school. He uses the fact that they fear him to make them do illegal and humiliating things for his own benefit. In each series of the new run, there have been multiple revelations made about him. They include that he joined the IRA and the Priesthood (both while drunk), has an indentical twin who is a priest in Poland, and that he skipped a generational curse because he is not actually related to his father.
- Grainne (Diona Doherty) – Grainne McCallion, a recent addition, is Dympna's assistant. She is rude and immature, and dismisses everyone around her as being boring or stupid. She is ignorant of Northern Irish history and politics even though she works for Sinn Fein with her mother Elisha McCallion. She enrolled as a student at Queen's despite being on furlough from her present job. Uncle Andy is convinced that she is his daughter from a one night stand, but she is unaware of this. She is initially terrified by Uncle Andy's attempts to bond with her, but they develop a reluctant friendship. Even though she acts dumb, she often demonstrates that she is highly intelligent and well-connected. Even though all of her classes have been online (due to government responses to the COVID-19 pandemic), she has become a major influencer among Catholic students. Being from Derry, she is the only main character not to be from the greater Belfast area. She did not appear and was not mentioned in the 2023 series for unknown reasons.
- Sandy (Ciaran Nolan) – Sandy is the current landlord at the Loyalist Kneebreakers Social Club. While he has been mentioned repeatedly during the original run, he made his first onscreen appearances in the 2020 series (after the passing of Hogg). He has a speech impediment that causes him to pronounce the "s" sound as "sh". For this reason, he pronounces his own name as "Shandy". While he respects Begbie, he is one of two characters who does not fear him. He repeatedly barred Andy due to his various scams but secretly cares deeply about him. He is shown to be the most intuitive character and uses this to his advantage. In the 2022 series, he has a brief affair with Dymphna to help her become pregnant when she learns Billy had a vascetomy.

Other occasional characters are:

- Red Hand Luke (Dan Gordon) – A born-again Christian and violent loyalist psychopath. He had been friends with Andy since school even though Andy fears him. In the first series, Andy is convinced Luke wants to kill him for not helping him escape the police. Instead, he believes prison changed his life for the better and thanks Andy. From the second series onwards, he is shown to be child-like in spite of his violent tendencies. He tends to beat people up (usually Andy and Mervyn) when he doesn't get his way. They live in fear of when he will suddenly (literally) burst through their front door. Although he does sometimes have brief moments of clarity where he realises his circumstances are because of his own behaviour. He is a huge "Shugo" Duncan fan and is unafraid of Begbie, his best friend. At the end of the original run, he longs to go back to prison and converts to Islam in order to get arrested. Andy and Mervyn attempt to break him out of the specially constructed prison in the middle of Belfast Lough. He falls into the Lough, protesting that he cannot swim. He reappeared in the 2016 special.
- Sammy (Gordon Fulton) – The first landlord of the "Loyalist Kneebreakers", Uncle Andy and Big Mervyn's favourite haunt, a rowdy loyalist drinking den. Makes matchstick models of Stormont in his spare time.
- Seamus (Mark O'Shea) – Seamus works directly for Gerry Adams in Sinn Fein in constantly changing roles. He doesn't allow Da or Cal to tell anyone he is also in the IRA. Seamus invites himself into Da's flat with instructions from Gerry to help either organisation, hinting at serious repercussions for their (inevitable) failures. Da tries to earn Seamus' trust by proving his loyalty and is fully aware Seamus is involved with organised crime.
- Sean Paul II (Gerard Jordan) – Sean Paul is a young man who will steal anything. Ma points out his nickname is "Sean Paul the Second" because he steals your possessions "the second your back is turned". Ma is horrified that Da keeps hiring him or buying stolen goods from him. Da justifies this by pretending he is supporting an "enterprising young man" when in reality he likes cheap products or labour.
- Paul – Paul is one of Da and Ma's six children. He is sent to prison during the pilot episode. The parents often update Cal on Paul's present situation. Either Da praises Paul's "sacrifice" while he is in prison, or Ma praises Paul for starting a new life as a wealthy family man in Los Angeles. Cal is strongly jealous of Paul, especially when he randomly returns from L.A. Cal discovers that Paul was thrown out by his wife due to his refusal to find a job, and takes great joy in exposing the secret. However, as he comes clean, he receives a message from his wife that Paul has successfully sold a script that will be turned into a major Hollywood movie, which he has also been hired to direct, and that she is willing to take him back.

There have been other characters that have made one-off special appearances over the series to an effect. One such example was a Christmas special entitled "The King and I" where Elvis Presley (played by impersonator Martin Fox) saved Andy from a very dangerous situation.

== Episodes ==
Series
Series	Episodes	Originally released	
Series	Episodes	First released	Last released
Pilot		31 August 1995	
1	6	16 January 1998	20 February 1998
2	6	22 May 1998	25 June 1998
Special		18 December 1998	
3	6	25 May 1999	2 July 1999
Special		17 December 1999	
4	8	12 May 2000	30 June 2000
Special		21 December 2000	
5	6	25 May 2001	29 June 2001
6	6	23 November 2001	28 December 2001
7	6	17 May 2002	21 June 2002
8	6	22 November 2002	27 December 2002
9	6	28 November 2003	2 January 2004
10	10	26 November 2004	11 February 2005
Special		23 December 2005	
Special		18 April 2006	
Special		22 December 2006	
Special		28 December 2007	
Special		28 December 2016	
11	3	19 January 2018	2 February 2018
Special		27 December 2018	
Special		27 December 2019	
12	3	30 December 2019	17 January 2020
13	4	27 December 2020	29 January 2021
14	4	27 December 2021	21 January 2022
15	4	26 December 2022	20 January 2023
16	4	28 December 2023	19 January 2024
Special		23 December 2024	

== Home media ==
=== VHS ===
A VHS was released containing the following three episodes; Hollywood on the Falls, Red Hand Luke, The Peace Dividend.

=== DVD ===
Only series six has been released on DVD to date. It was released in two parts, with three episodes on each, before being sold together as part of a box set. One notable edit is that the theme song has been replaced.

Release name	No. of discs	Episodes included
Series 6 Part 1	1	Three episodes - Intiminadation [sic], The Drugs Don't Work, A Christmas Carol.
Series 6 Part 2	1	Three episodes - Day in the Life, Seven, The Shoes of the Fisherman.
Series 6 Vol 1 & 2	2	Includes the six episodes mentioned in above releases.

=== Digital ===
The 2016 special The Farce Awakens (21 October 2016) and the documentary A Beginner's Guide (28 December 2016) that was broadcast on BBC One are both available on BBC Store.

== Trivia ==
- The phrase "give my head peace" is a common idiom in Northern Ireland meaning "leave me alone" or "stop bothering me".
- The theme song of the series is "She Says" performed by The Saw Doctors. It was released as a single in Ireland in the late 1990s.
