= Jake O'Kane =

Comedian from Northern Ireland

- Born: 12 March 1961 (age 65); Belfast, Northern Ireland
- Occupations: Comedian, Columnist, Businessman
- Known for: The Blame Game
- Children: 2

Jake O’Kane (born 12 March 1961) is a Belfast-based stand-up comedian, and a resident compère of the Northern Ireland comedy club, "The Empire Laughs Back" at The Empire Music Hall in Belfast.

O'Kane has toured on the comedy circuit, and has also appeared at clubs including The Stand, Jongleurs and The Comedy Store.

He hosted and performed on the BBC Northern Ireland stand up television show One Night Stand, and was a resident panellist on the show The Blame Game on both TV and radio from 2005 to 2021.

In addition to his comedy, O'Kane also runs an off licence shop in North Belfast.

== Personal life ==
O'Kane lives in North Belfast with his wife and 2 children. He was a champion power-lifter in his youth. O'Kane suffers from coeliac disease, ADHD (Attention Deficit Hyperactivity Disorder) which he was recently diagnosed with. He is teetotal. His father, Jim O'Kane, was a Republican Labour councillor on Belfast City Council and was interned in 1971 as part of Operation Demetrius.

== Filmography ==
Television
	Title	Role	Channel
2005-2021	The Blame Game	Resident Panelist	BBC NI
	Give My Head Peace	Guest Performer	BBC NI
	One Night Stand	Host and Stand-up Performer	BBC NI
	Festival Nights	Guest Contributor	BBC NI
	The John Daly Show	Writer and Performer	BBC NI
	McKeever	Writer	UTV
	The Empire Laughs Back	Stand-up Performer	BBC NI
	The Empire Laughs Back II	Stand-up Performer	BBC NI
	Comic Relief	Stand-up Performer	BBC NI
	The Kelly Show	Writer and Performer	UTV

Radio
Year	Title	Role	Channel
2005-2021	The Blame Game	Resident Panelist	BBC Radio Ulster
	Festival Review	Contributor	BBC Radio Ulster
	Between the Lines	Contributor and Performer	RTÉ Radio
	Saturday View	Contributor and Performer	RTÉ Radio
	The John Daly Show	Contributor and Performer	Downtown Radio
