= Davy Sims =

Irish journalist

David Gerard (Davy) Sims (born 27 January 1956) is a broadcaster, writer and communications consultant from Northern Ireland. He lives in Holywood, County Down was educated St. Patrick's College, Knock.

From February 2001 to August 2008 he was head of New Media in BBC Northern Ireland. In 2007 was a founding member of Digital Circle – the representative body for the digital content industry in Northern Ireland - and its Chair in 2009/2010. He had been a member of the board of Momentum the representative body for the ICT industry in Northern Ireland and is a member of the board of the charity Achieve Enterprises.

He has been Head of Social Media at the Northern Ireland charity Public Achievement since January 2011 and runs the WIMPS (Where Is My Public Servant?) project.

He lives in Holywood with wife Dawn. He has two sons Adam and Owen.

== Broadcasting career ==
His broadcasting career began in February 1979 in Downtown Radio where he established himself as a supporter of the punk and post-punk music from Northern Ireland as well as a pioneering DJ highlighting new and emerging music, playing local indie music releases, giving new bands radio sessions and interviews.

=== BBC career ===
Joining BBC Northern Ireland in April 1986 he launched the Radio Ulster programme The Bottom Line (later renamed Across the Line) which he produced. He presented the programme once a week. The main presenter was Mike Edgar former drummer of Cruella de Ville. The programme's other presenters were Michael Bradley, former bassist with The Undertones and journalist Barry McIlheney.

In 1988 he had a short attachment to Sunday Sequence as presenter. In 1989 Davy spent six months at BBC Radio 4 as a senior producer making social action campaigns for BBC Radio 1, including the first Green Week supporting environmental action and documentaries for the project The Radio 4 Generation. Returning to Radio Ulster Davy worked in News and Current Affairs concentrating on international news including the fall of the Berlin Wall and the release of Nelson Mandela.

Invited to return to BBC Radio 4 in 1991, Davy was appointed Chief Producer leading the social action programme team. At that time he also produced the Radio 1 documentary in God’s Country with presenter Simon Mayo. From 1992 until 1999 Davy stayed with BBC Northern Ireland as a radio producer.

In 1999 he became the first Online producer for BBC Northern Ireland producing web sites for Ballykissangel, Across the Line and On Your Behalf. In 2001 he was promoted to Editor New Media where he remained until 2008 when he took voluntary redundancy from the BBC.

=== Post BBC Career ===
After leaving the BBC Davy continued to work in the communication and broadcasting industry. Working with a wide range of businesses in Northern Ireland including Momentum - the representative body for the Northern Ireland ICT industry - and broadcasting on U105 and BBC Radio Ulster. He was appointed Director of Communications for the Ulster Unionist Party in March 2010. He left to join Public Achievement.
