= Phil Taggart =

Irish radio presenter (born 1987)

- Born: Philip Taggart; 10 June 1986 (age 40); Derry, Northern Ireland
- Occupations: Radio presenter, DJ, television presenter, record label owner, author, club night owner

Philip Taggart (born 10 June 1987) is a Northern Irish DJ and radio presenter on BBC Radio Ulster, drive time host on SiriusXM and podcaster.

== Early life ==
Philly Taggart was born in Derry but was raised in Drumragh, a townland on the outskirts of Omagh in County Tyrone. He attended the Christian Brothers Grammar School, Omagh.

He played bass in the band Colenso Parade from age 15 to age 24. The band went on several tours throughout the UK and supported the likes of Richard Hawley, Dirty Pretty Things and The View.

Taggart started putting on gigs in his hometown at age 16, frustrated at not being able to get into 18+ gigs. Soon after this, he began to DJ regularly at local nightclubs. By the age of 17 he had begun writing for popular music magazine Alternative Ulster.

== Early radio career ==
While studying at the University of Ulster at Coleraine, Taggart won the BBC/Skillset Young Broadcaster of the Year

In 2008, Taggart helped set up and worked behind the scenes on the Omagh community radio station Strule FM. The station went on to pick up an award at the 2009 Sony Radio Academy Awards.

In 2010, Taggart was asked to stand in for regular presenter Rigsy on BBC Radio Ulster's Across the Line programme after taking part in a work experience scheme. After that he went on to cover on Across The Line regularly.

== BBC Radio 1 ==
In December 2011, Taggart became the host of BBC Introducing in Northern Ireland as part of Radio 1's regional output. The programme, broadcast on Sunday nights, showcases new music from Northern Ireland. Taggart was nominated for the "DAB Rising Star" award at the Sony Radio Academy Awards in 2012 following his work for BBC Introducing in Northern Ireland. Taggart also began appearing on some of the Radio 1's national programmes, covering for Sara Cox, Huw Stephens, Dev and Gemma Cairney.

Starting 7 January 2013, Taggart, alongside Alice Levine, took over the Monday–Thursday 10 pm–midnight show on Radio 1. It was previously hosted by Nick Grimshaw, who moved to breakfast. In September 2014, the station's schedule changed. The 10 pm – midnight show hosted by Taggart and Levine was replaced by a 10 pm – 1 am show hosted by Huw Stephens Monday – Wednesday and The Residency DJs on Thursdays. Taggart then went on to host a Thursday night programme focusing on new music from across the genres from 9 pm to 10 pm.

With Annie Mac taking over Zane Lowe's weekday programme, Taggart was given the Sunday night show (10 pm – 1 am). This was in addition to his Thursday night programme.

In April 2016, Taggart's Thursday show ended, instead hosting Sunday 7 pm – 9 pm slot in which the first 2 hours were dedicated to playing new chilled out tracks with the final hour concentrating on exclusively brand new sounds. Popular features on the show included the Bedtime Mix, Future Firsts and the Sunday Night Support Club.

From October 2016, Taggart presented a new show at the station entitled Radio 1's Specialist Chart/Hype Chart, in which the most frequently played tracks on Radio 1's specialist shows from the previous seven days are counted down. This airs every Tuesday morning from 3 am to 4 am. This show was axed at the start of September 2019.

In 2018, Taggart's Sunday night slow was renamed Radio 1's Chillest Show. A regular feature was the Radio 1 Piano Session, which has seen various guests.

In November 2020, it was announced that Taggart would be leaving Radio 1 in January 2021. The Chillest Show will be taken over by Sian Eleri.

== Television work ==
Taggart appeared as part of the BBC Three television coverage of Radio 1's Big Weekend 2013, which was held in Derry. He was also the face of BBC Northern Ireland's television coverage.

On 19 December 2013, Taggart fronted Christmas on Benefits, a documentary on BBC Three in which he travelled to Bristol to meet a group of young jobseekers, and set them the mission of organising a Christmas party on a benefits budget.

Taggart presented Best Before on Channel 4 in 2015, each episode featuring a guest curator. They included Wolf Alice, Gilles Peterson, Big Narstie, Eats Everything, Naughty Boy and Sleaford Mods.

Taggart has done various work for BBC Northern Ireland TV.

== Hometown Records ==
Taggart owns an independent record label called Hometown Records. The labels first release was Raise Your Love, an EP by Rhodes on 28 October 2013. They have gone on to sign and release music from Rat Boy, Rejjie Snow, Inheaven, TOUTS, Wildes, Yonaka, Grace Acladna, Speelburg, Love Ssega.

== DJ work ==
In 2016, Taggart held a residency at Ibiza Rocks and a monthly residency at Koko in Camden. He has toured extensively in the United Kingdom and Europe, performing a range of dance music genres.

== Slacker Club/podcast/book ==
He runs a club night in East London called Slacker. It began in June 2015 with the first London gig from Frank Carter & The Rattlesnakes with a support lineup of Inheaven, VANT and Breakage. Slacker has sold-out venues such as Moth Club, Oslo, The Victoria and is currently resident in the London club XOYO. Acts to have played Slacker: Frank Carter & The Rattlesnakes, Rat Boy, Blossoms, Slaves, Big Narstie, The Japanese House, Isaac Gracie, Pretty Vicious, Swim Deep, Beaty Heart, Fakear, Bishop Briggs, Day Wave and others.

In September 2018, Taggart launched "Phil Taggart’s Slacker Podcast", a weekly podcast looking at the careers of musicians whom guest on the podcast. Both Series 1 and Series 2 have gone to Number 1 on the Music Podcast Chart. Guests have included Johnny Marr, Fatboy Slim, Christine + The Queens, Dizzee Rascal, and Wolf Alice among others.

In May 2019, he launched his first book entitled Phil Taggart's Slacker Guide to the Music Industry. The book is a guide for artists to help navigate them through the topsy turvy world of releasing music. It was done through two years of research and over 70 contributions from top music industry people and artists such as Run The Jewels, Biffy Clyro, Little Simz, Charli XCX and more.

== VEVO ==
Taggart has presented many roles for Vevo including their 2016 Lift series, their mainstream brand VVV as well as coverage from The Great Escape and Bestival.
