= Olivia Nash =

Northern Irish actress

Olivia Nash MBE
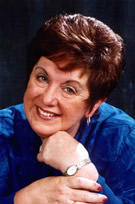
- Born: 1942 (age 83–84); Larne, Northern Ireland
- Occupation: Actress/Comedienne
- Years active: 1985–present (actress)
- Known for: Give My Head Peace
- Children: 1

Olivia Nash MBE is an actress and performer from Northern Ireland. Nash has appeared on the Northern Ireland scene for more than 40 years. Olivia performs on stage, television and radio, where she has performed with James Young for 11 years and Northern Ireland comedian Nuala McKeever. She has toured the United States and Canada with the Charabanc Theatre Company, and is best known for her role as "Ma" in the television series Give My Head Peace.

== Personal life ==
Nash grew up in Larne, Northern Ireland, with her mother and father, Patsy and Tommy, and her sister Mel. She attended St Louis Grammar School in Ballymena from 1953 to 1960. When she left school, she got involved with the Larne Drama Circle and, as of 2019, is still a member.

She and her husband, who died when Nash was 38, had one daughter together, Patricia. She has three grandchildren: Gabriel, Daisy and Livi.

== Career and charity work ==
Olivia Nash was appointed MBE for services to theatre and charity in 2006.

Nash has raised £189,000 for The Children's Hospice with the help of her "Mrs Walker" character. She is also the face of the EHS Wake Up to Waste campaign.

== Filmography ==
Year	Title	Role	Notes
1985	We'll Support You Evermore	Woman at Farm	TV movie
1986	The Daily Woman	Dinner Guest	TV movie
1987	First Sight	Peggy	
1990	Shoot to Kill	McKerr's Mother	TV movie
1991	Screenplay	Bag Lady	
1991	Children of the North	McCluskey's Mother	
1993	Comedy Playhouse	Mrs Mac	
1995	Two Ceasefires and a Wedding	Ma	TV movie
1997	The Detectives	Olivia	
1998-2007, 2016–2024	Give My Head Peace	Ma	
2000	Mad about Mambo	Mrs Hannah	
2000	The Most Fertile Man in Ireland	Ma	
2000	An Everlasting Piece	Eileen McGivern	
2002	Puckoon	Maudie O'Toole	
2003	I Fought the Law	Sanndra	
2007	Closing the Ring	First Woman in Rain	
2008	Miss Conception	Cash Till Lady	
2009	May's Panto Party	Performer	TV movie
2010	Small Change	Mary	Short
2013	Blandings	Mrs Rossiter	
2013	Wasted	Aunt Mary	Short
2013	A Belfast Story	Detective's Wife	
2016	V Sign		TV movie
2018	Grace and Goliath	Lily	
2019	Island's Apart	Mrs Cecil	Short
