= Dry Your Eyes (TV series) =

- Created by: Damon Quinn
- Starring: (2006); Martin Reid; Tim McGarry; Damon Quinn; Michael McDowell; Martin McCann; Emma Little; Sharon Norwood (2022); Diona Doherty; Michael Stranney; Niamh McAllister; Bernadette Brown; Cailum Carragher
- Country of origin: Northern Ireland
- No. of seasons: 2
- No. of episodes: 12

Production
- Running time: 30 mins

Original release
- Network: BBC One (NI)
- Release: 10 March 2006

Dry Your Eyes is a Northern Irish sketch show which aired on BBC One NI in 2006, and was created by the Hole in the Wall Gang, the makers of one of Northern Ireland's most successful shows Give My Head Peace. The show was 'written' by Damon Quinn who also produced and appeared in the series.

Writer Damon Quinn said "It's a temporary move away from Give My Head Peace for us and is made up of a series of short series featuring new characters. We are delighted to be able to welcome on board actors Sharon Morwood, Martin McCann and Emma Little, which is a credit to BBC Northern Ireland in its commitment to bringing on local talent and promoting local comedy."

A second series with a revamped cast - Diona Doherty, Michael Stranney, Niamh McAllister, Bernadette Brown, Cailum Carragher - aired in January 2022.

== Recurring sketches ==
=== Named characters ===
- Angry Steve is an overweight radio DJ who is usually unpopular with his audience and makes disparaging comments to his assistants. Fans widely believed Angry Steve was based on Radio Ulster talk show host Stephen Nolan, although the creators claim that any likeness was entirely coincidental. Played by Damon Quinn.
- Arthur Heckler is a loud character who insults just about everyone – including his wife – and then retracts it by saying "I'm only sleggin'!". Arthur once ran a course in heckling at Queens, although it was closed down after he failed all his students. Played by Tim McGarry.
- Darren is introduced to someone by his girlfriend, but somehow always says something innocent that upsets them. The girlfriend angrily "reminds" Darren that the person is recently bereaved and he had just made a reference to the departed. This is also promptly followed by Darren then upsetting somebody else, who attacks him without explanation.
- Betty the Cleaner usually interrupts important events to ask when she can start cleaning, such as the evolution of apes and a UN meeting. her catchphrase is "Are youse gonna be long?" Played by Tim McGarry.
- Derek is a fanatic, foul-mouthed Linfield F.C. supporter. He has a very direct and no-nonsense way of dealing with issues. When disagreeing with someone, he usually blurts out "Is it/Are you by fuck!". He is widely regarded as the most popular character in the series. Derek is played by Martin Reid.
- McDowell Brothers: Jonjo 1 (Martin Reid) and his brother Jonjo 2 (Michael McDowell) are two motorbike enthusiasts from Rasharkin, County Antrim. Despite their name being written as McDowell, they claim it is actually pronounced "McDooooooooowell". In the second series, the brothers were terrorised by a supernatural bike named Black Betty.
- Norman and his mother: A man (Michael McDowell) who goes around wheeling the corpse of his dead mother in a wheelchair. The mother speaks to Norman in his mind and reprimands him at any opportunity. These sketches are a clear reference to the 1960 film Psycho, with Norman being based on Norman Bates and his mother on Norma Bates.
- Patrick Irishman always responds to unfavourable outcomes by accusing the other person of discriminating against him because he is "Irish". However, Patrick has a fondness of making discriminatory comments towards English people. For reasons that are never addressed, he dresses like a leprechaun.
- Trendy Priest: A young priest (Martin McCann) is taking part in an event and doing his normal clerical duties: at some point his mobile phone rings with the unmistakable Crazy Frog ringtone. The priest starts chatting to his friend about where is his, often making disparaging remarks about his audience.

=== Nameless characters ===
While each of these characters had names in the script, none of them are mentioned in the show itself.

- Desperate Boyfriend – A young man proposes to his girlfriend in a restaurant despite admitting they haven't known each other long. But something always happens to scare off the girlfriend.
- Distraught Woman – A woman who cries uncontrollably so that others around her are guilted into doing whatever she wants. Once she has gotten her way, she clarifies that she was never upset.
- Flop Star – A woman who always tries to impress people with her singing, despite not being good at it, and it interfering with her job.
- "Mick" – Mick randomly interrupts situations to gesture to the camera that he has "had" the woman in shot. His appearance is based on singer Mick Hucknell.
- Odd Couple / Taxi Cab – In series 1, a married couple are standing at the bar in a busy pub. One of them makes a regular comment with an unexpected conclusion, which creates a stunned silence in the bar. In series 2, the segment takes place with different people in a taxi cab. A different passenger makes the remark to a clearly stunned driver. In one sketch, Arthur Heckler is the passenger.
- Ungrateful Mother – The ungrateful mother praises someone who went out of their way to do something kind for her, but then complains that the person should have done more for her. Her catchphrase is "I just thought that they could have...".
- Vexxed Pops / Pregnant Teen – A reporter asks a family about a famous figure, and the father becomes irate and accuses the personality of being a known degenerate, which is verified by his wife and heavily pregnant daughter. In series 2, this was an accompanied by a spin-off sketch where the heavily pregnant daughter makes observations which seem to miss the fact that she is pregnant.

== Stage show ==
In the spring of 2007 Dry Your Eyes it's Give My Head Peace played sell-out shows at two venues in Northern Ireland; the Millennium Forum in Derry from 19 to 24 March and at Belfast's Grand Opera House from 26 March – 7 April. The show featured new material from Dry Your Eyes and Give My Head Peace and Tim McGarry also performed stand-up comedy. It was very well received. The next show in 2008, Give My Head Peace: Back from the Grave, also featured stand-up comedy and appearances by Dry Your Eyes characters Derek and the McDowell Brothers alongside the regular Give My Head Peace cast.

== Trivia ==
- The theme tune to Dry Your Eyes is a recording also titled 'Dry Your Eyes', written and performed by The Proclaimers exclusively for the show.
- Linfield manager David Jeffrey criticised the Derek sketch in February 2007 over fears it would harm the club's image. He claimed it "brings up the old stereotypical image of what a Linfield supporter used to be like".
- The idea for the McDowell Brothers came about after the Gang read about a local rider who was badly injured in a crash in 2006. Despite his long-term injuries his only real concern was whether he would be able to race in the North West 200.
