= Across the Line (radio show) =

Radio programme on BBC Radio Ulster

ATL logo

Across the Line is a music radio show on BBC Radio Ulster, established in 1986 as The Bottom Line. It focuses on new music from Northern Ireland and from all of Ireland. From 1990 to 1994, Across the Line was also broadcast across the UK on BBC Radio 5. It most recently aired on Fridays from 6:05 pm to 7:00 pm under the title ATL Introducing, presented by Gemma Bradley, who also hosted the national Introducing show on BBC Radio 1. Across the Line previously aired on Mondays from 9:30 pm to 11:00 pm, and in other evening timeslots. The programme has been on hiatus since May 2025.

Support for Northern Ireland music and musicians has been central to the Across the Line editorial brief. Since its inception in 1986 as The Bottom Line, the programme has championed Northern Irish rock music and in particular bands from Northern Ireland. The show is also known for its website, www.bbc.co.uk/atl, and has also had a television version, ATL TV. Across the Line won gold at the PPI Awards in 2008, 2009 and 2016, then the equivalent IMRO Awards in 2020 and 2021 (the Irish version of the UK 'Sonys'/ARIAs).

Regular contributors have included Stuart Bailie (who also writes for NME magazine), Phil Taggart (BBC Radio 1), Niall Byrne (Nialler 9), Paul McClean, Helen Toland and Bernard Keenan. For several years, Rigsy presented alongside Donna Legge. Until early 2012, Paul Hamill presented the ATL Dance Show.

== History ==
Established on 8 September 1986, The Bottom Line was named after Big Audio Dynamite's song "The Bottom Line", which the programme used as its theme tune. The original presenters were Mike Edgar, Davy Sims, Michael Bradley and Barry McIlheney. Mike Edgar had been drummer with Cruella de Ville and started the programme presenting on Monday, Tuesday and Wednesday evenings. Davy Sims was the producer and founder of the programme. He had been working in Downtown Radio before joining BBC Radio Ulster and presented the Thursday edition. Michael Bradley "Mickey", had been bassist with The Undertones. He presented three out of four Friday editions. The monthly London edition of the programme was with Barry McIlheney, former editor of Smash Hits and Empire magazines.

After a short time off air, the programme returned as Across the Line, presented by Mike Edgar. It was broadcast on Sunday nights on Radio Ulster and, between 1990 and 1994, on BBC Radio 5. For much of this time, the programme was broadcast from 10:10 to 11:00 pm on Radio Ulster, but continuing until midnight on Radio 5. During this period, there were several non-music features such as The Week in the World of Politics, presented by contributors such as Malachi O'Doherty and sketches from The Hole in the Wall Gang who would later go on to star in Radio and TV shows of their own.

After the demise of Radio 5, Across the Line continued as an hour-long Radio Ulster programme, before moving to Monday-Thursday 9:00 to 10:00 pm.

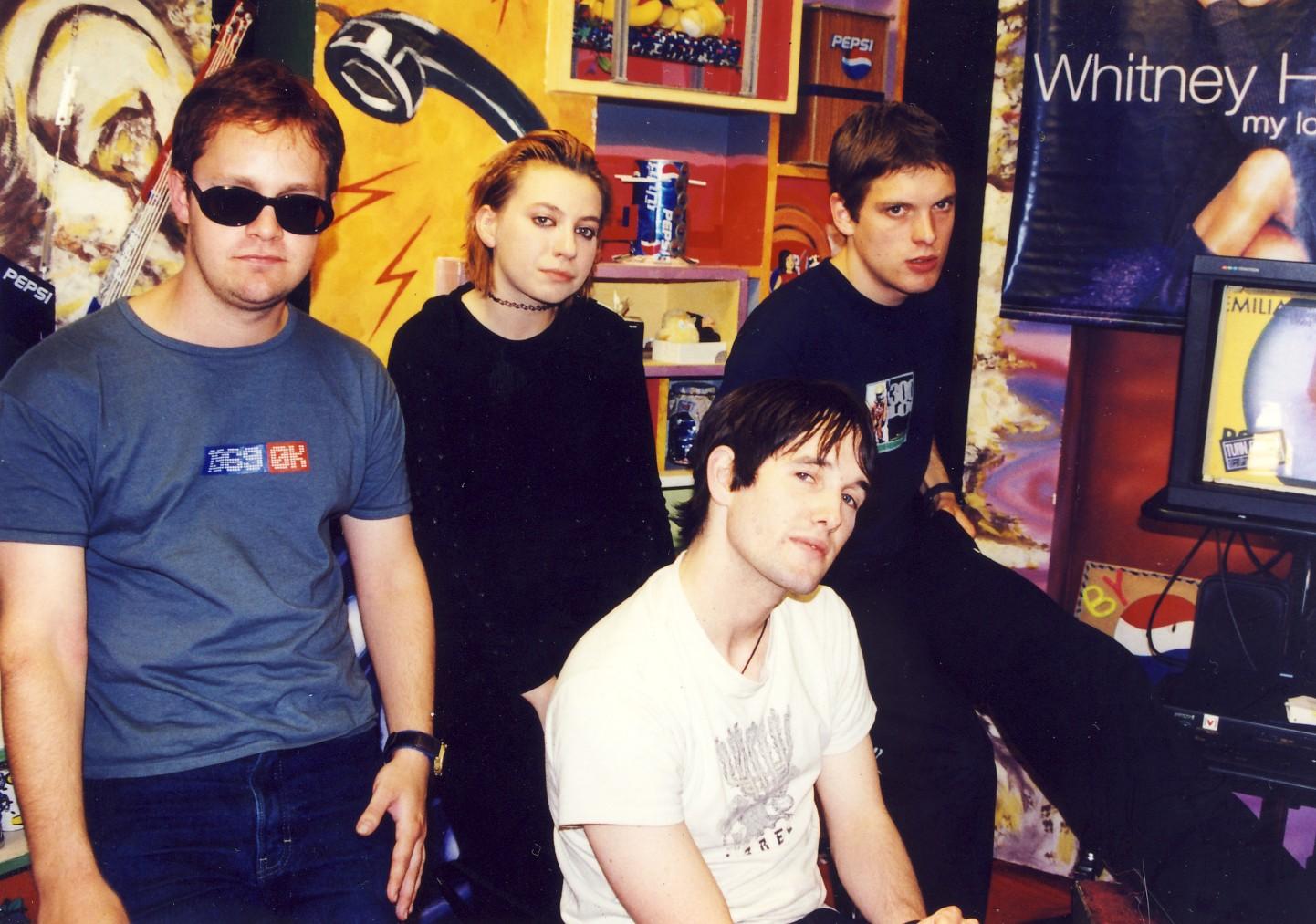
Ash in 1999; the band has been one of the main Northern Irish acts during Across The Line's run

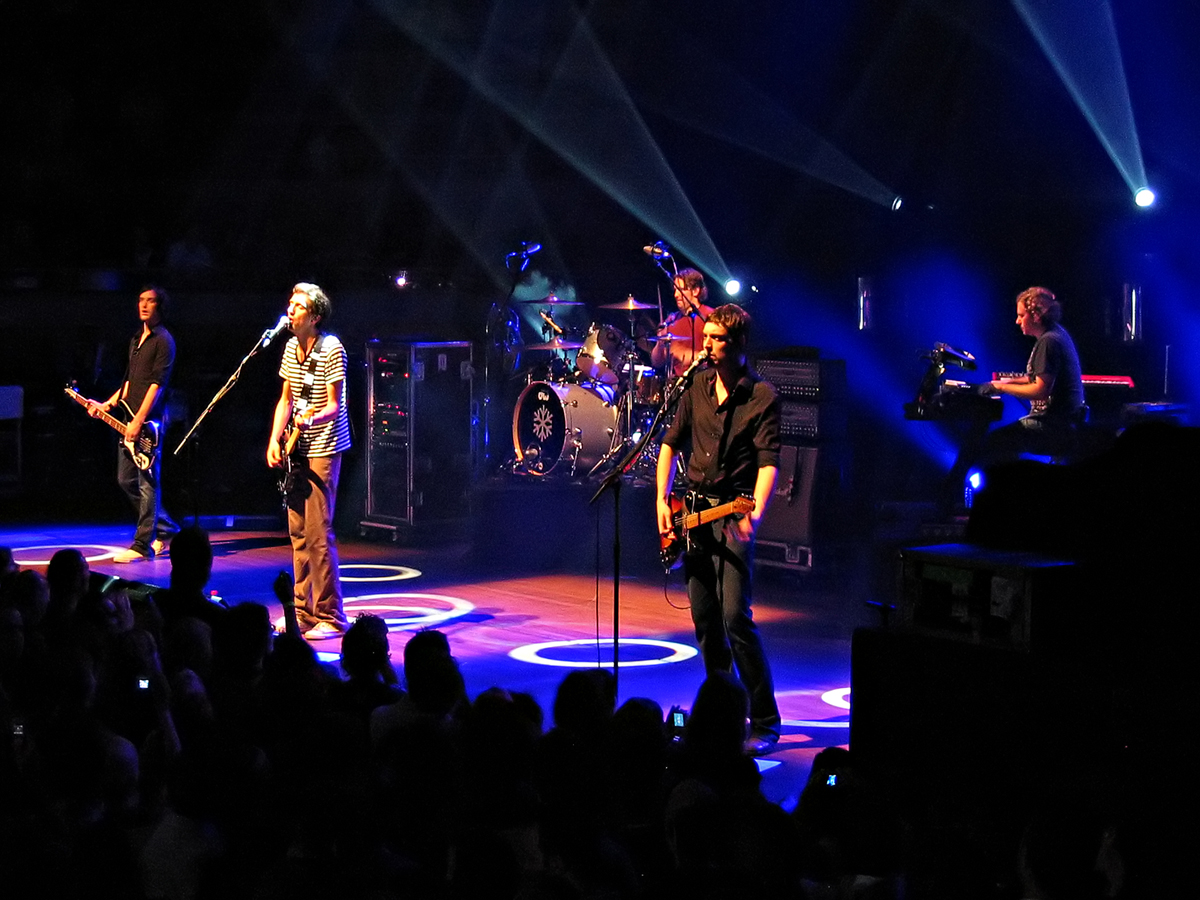
Snow Patrol in concert in 2006

The show is aimed at teenagers and young adults, the same target audience as BBC Radio 1, but with a closer regional focus. The show is notable for its promotion of local musical talent, actively promoting Snow Patrol before they became widely known. This tradition continued with the regular "That New Band Smell" section on the show.

Over its three-decade span ATL radio has had various core presenters for the main indie and rock shows, most notably Mike Edgar, Donna Legge, Rory McConnell and Paul McClean (co-presenting) and Rigsy (David O'Reilly), but it has also regularly entertained special guest presenters and co-presenters – these have included Michael McKeegan from Therapy?, Snow Patrol, David Holmes, Radiohead, In Case of Fire, Two Door Cinema Club and General Fiasco.

Since 1999, dance and club life has played an important role in the show. The ATL Dance Show was initiated by Paul McClean, beginning on Thursday nights, before the show moved to a Saturday-night slot and then a Friday-night slot; the Dance Show was dedicated to electronic music from hip-hop and house music to drum and bass and techno and was presented by Belfast club DJ Paul Hamill with a strong emphasis on supporting the music of local DJs and artists. Co-presenters included techno DJ Dave Clarke.

In 2008, Across the Line was awarded the New Irish Music gold award at the prestigious PPI Irish Radio awards, with the same production team gaining a second gold in the Music Special category for the documentary 'A Beautiful Day' about the U2 and Ash Waterfront Hall concert in 1998 which arguably had an effect on the NI peace process. Across the Line won the gold award once again in 2009.

In early 2009, the ATL team assembled a line-up for the celebrations of the reopening of the Ulster Hall in Belfast. Broadcasting live from the venue (and later screened on BBC Two Northern Ireland), the event featured a surprise appearance from Snow Patrol after performances from Ash, Divine Comedy, Duke Special, Therapy?, Foy Vance, Panama Kings, Cashier No.9, Kowalski, LaFaro, Fighting with Wire, The Lowly Knights and many more.

In 2010, Phil Taggart was asked to stand in for regular presenter Rigsy on Across the Line after taking part in a work experience scheme. After that, he went on to cover on ATL regularly and ended up presenting BBC Introducing in Northern Ireland on Radio 1. Phil Taggart co-hosted a show with Alice Levine on BBC Radio 1, and he was a presenter on Radio 1 until 2020.

The 30th anniversary of Across the Line, in 2016, was marked by a concert in Belfast and by a documentary on BBC One Northern Ireland, Across the Line at 30, narrated by Colin Murray.

Rigsy's final show was on 14 October 2019. Gemma Bradley took over as the new host of the programme, which was also renamed from Across the Line to ATL Introducing at the same time, reflecting the wide use of the BBC Introducing brand for new-music programmes on the BBC radio network.

Gemma Bradley presented ATL Introducing from 2019 onwards on Monday evenings from 9:30 to 11:00 pm, while she also hosted the main national Introducing programme on BBC Radio 1 from 2021 to 2023. From April 2023, ATL Introducing was moved to Friday evenings at 6:05 pm and its runtime was reduced to 55 minutes (losing half an hour). In May 2025, ATL Introducing was placed on hiatus by Radio Ulster; Gemma Bradley presented an episode paying tribute to Across the Line on 2 May 2025. The show was replaced by BBC Introducing in Northern Ireland with Taylor Johnson.

== ATL TV ==
The same team also produce the BBC Northern Ireland television series, ATL TV, presented by Legge and O'Reilly. Colin Murray also appeared on the show. The show has had four series of six shows, in 2004, 2005, 2006 and 2008 with a fifth series of festival highlights broadcast in summer 2008. Each show is made up of live music, music videos which are specially commissioned by ATL (featuring new directing talent) and interviews, mainly featuring bands from Northern Ireland. However Coldplay, Foo Fighters, Chemical Brothers, Stereophonics and other international acts have also appeared. On series four, subversive Irish music scene animators Eyebrowy were commissioned to lampoon Northern Irish musical icons.

== ATL Rockschool ==
ATL Rockschool is a TV 'battle of the bands' on BBC Two Northern Ireland. Hosted by Rigsy and Donna Legge, the final on all three years features six bands from Northern Ireland, with every band member still at school.

The Tides won in 2006, with Busted guitarist James Bourne, Kerrang Editor Paul Brannigan and MTV presenter Emma Griffiths on the judging panel. Nice N' Sleazy won in 2007, with Divine Comedy frontman Neil Hannon, NME writer James Jam and Therapy? bassist Michael Mc Keegan judging. Both bands then played the Tennents ViTal festival in Ormeau Park.

ATL Rockschool returned in January 2008, presented by Rigsy and Jill Morgan and was won by a new act called The Good Fight.
