= St. Patrick's Grammar School =

St. Patrick's Grammar School may refer to:

- St Patrick's Grammar School, Armagh, Armagh, Northern Ireland
- St Patrick's Grammar School, Downpatrick, Downpatrick, County Down, Northern Ireland
