= St Patrick's Grammar School =

St Patrick's Grammar School may refer to:

- St Patrick's Grammar School, Downpatrick
- St Patrick's Grammar School, Armagh
