= Nuala McKeever =

Northern Irish actress

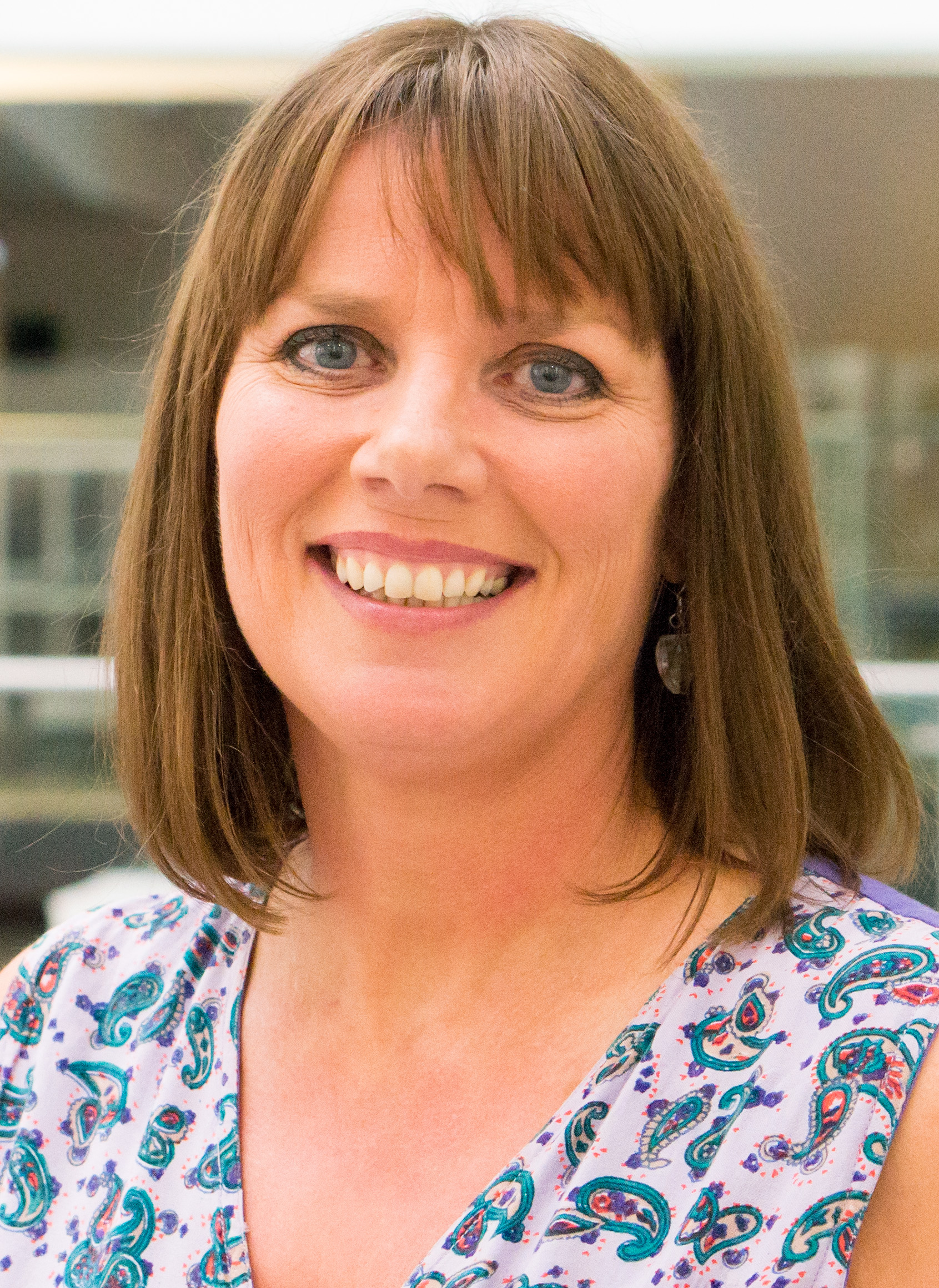
- Nuala McKeever in 2014
- Born: 1964 (age 61–62); Belfast, Northern Ireland
- Education: Queen's University Belfast
- Occupation: Comic actress
- Spouse: Sean Carson (m1996-2000)
- Partner: Mike Moloney (2010 - 2013)

Nuala McKeever (born 1964) is an actress from Belfast, Northern Ireland.

== Early life and education ==
McKeever grew up in the west of the city and graduated from Queen's University Belfast with a degree in languages.

== Career ==
After graduating from university, McKeever worked at BBC Northern Ireland for eight years, initially as a secretary before becoming a researcher.

One of the first projects she worked on after quitting her research job was The Wilsons, for BBC Radio Ulster.

This was followed by an appearance in Two Ceasefires and a Wedding (1995), a short film made for the BBC by the Northern Irish comedy group Hole in the Wall Gang. The resulting comedy television series Give My Head Peace made McKeever a household name in Northern Ireland. She played the character "Emer" for two series.

After leaving Give My Head Peace, she was hired by UTV. Here she wrote and produced McKeever, a sketch show.

Her first play, Out of The Box, directed by Andrea Montgomery, premiered at the Belfast Festival at Queen's in October 2005, and subsequently was performed at the Riverside Theatre, Coleraine at the University of Ulster and at the Lyric Theatre in Belfast in April 2006. The play toured across Ireland before closing with a week as the first production in the new Grand Opera House Studio in Belfast in December 2006.

Subsequently, McKeever and Montgomery produced It's Not All Rain & Potatoes, a sketch comedy about Ireland for Terra Nova Productions, and Is It Me?, a sitcom for BBC Northern Ireland.

== Personal life ==
Mc Keever married writer Sean Carson in 1996. After four years the couple separated and subsequently divorced. Her boyfriend, Australian-born Mike Moloney, died in an accident at his north Belfast home in April 2013.

In 2014 she came out as a lesbian in her newspaper column.

On 25 May 2020 she was presenting BBC Radio Ulster and without her knowledge that her microphone had been left on she said regarding Prime Minister Johnson's top aid Dominic Cummings “I was thinking he was such a dick I had written his name down as Richard Cummings” which was broadcast over the airwaves, The BBC told the Belfast Telegraph “the comments were not intended for broadcast and should not have been… We very much regret what happened and the upset caused.”

McKeever has been a vegetarian since she was 16.

== See also ==
- List of British actors
- List of British playwrights since 1950
- List of Queen's University Belfast people
