= Soft Border Patrol =

UK television program

- Genre: Sitcom; Mockumentary
- Written by: The Ulster Fry; Joe Hullait; Stephen G Large; Ciaran Bartlett; PJ Hart; Susannah McKenna; Marc McElroy; Eoin Cleland; Matthew McDevitt; Bryce Hart; Ryan Early
- Directed by: Iain Davidson
- Starring: Alan Irwin; Diona Doherty; Patrick Buchanan; Neil Delamere; Eline Van der Velden
- Country of origin: United Kingdom
- No. of series: 3
- No. of episodes: 11

Production
- Executive producers: Justin Binding; Rab Christie; Gavin Smith
- Producer: Marie McDonald
- Editor: Simon Hamilton
- Running time: approx. 28 minutes
- Production company: The Comedy Unit

Original release
- Network: BBC Northern Ireland
- Release: 2 March 2018 – 20 March 2020

Soft Border Patrol is a Northern Irish mockumentary sitcom in the style of a reality television programme based on the subject of the Republic of Ireland–United Kingdom border in a post-Brexit world. It shadows the Soft Border Patrol, a fictional border agency backed by governments in London, Dublin and Belfast, and the European Commission in Brussels. The title is a play on the desire at the time of writing for the outcome of the Brexit negotiations for there to be a soft border between the Republic of Ireland and Northern Ireland. Much of the series was unscripted, with broad ideas given to the cast by the writers.

It was written by the Glasgow-based The Comedy Unit and the first episode was broadcast on BBC One Northern Ireland on 2 March 2018 at 22:35, with episodes two and three following on the 9 and 16 March.

== Cast ==
- Karen Hassan as Lisa McCoy
- Alan Irwin as Sandy Donaldson
- Neil Delamere as Niall Sweeney
- Diona Doherty as Tracy Jones
- Patrick Buchanan as Connor Lafferty
- Chris Patrick-Simpson as Kris Davis
- Michael Condron as Ben McGregor
- Julie Maxwell as Charlene Dunn
- Faolan Morgan as Derek O'Hara
- Eline Van der Velden as Marianne Van Kesteren
- David Ireland as Farmer Campbell
- Michael Stranney as Craig Carson
- Elaine Malcolmson as Penny
- Keith Singleton as Michael Flynn
- Lucy McConnell as Heather Campbell
- Christian Talbot as Norman Norman
- Shane Todd as Laurence Lyle

== Writers ==
- The Ulster Fry
- Joe Hullait
- Stephen G Large
- Ciaran Bartlett
- PJ Hart
- Susannah McKenna
- Marc McElroy
- Matthew McDevitt
- Bryce Hart
- Leesa Harker
- Eoin Cleland
- Ryan Early

Additional material by the cast

== Episodes ==
Series	Episodes	Originally released	
Series	Episodes	First released	Last released
1	3	2 March 2018	16 March 2018
2	5	8 February 2019	8 March 2019
3	4	21 February 2020	20 March 2020

=== Series 1 (2018) ===
No.	Title	Directed by	Written by	Original release date
1	"Hearts and Minds"	Iain Davidson	Unknown	2 March 2018
Does a plank across a stream constitute an illegal border crossing? Is chorizo still legal in Northern Ireland? Thankfully the SBP are here to provide information and clarification.
2	"The Eyes of the World"	Iain Davidson	Unknown	9 March 2018
The SBP are alert and ready to deal with any border situation. These include deciding if an abandoned fish is a Free State fish or property of the Queen, the Continuity Nine County Sovereignty Committee striving to unify the nine counties of Ulster and identifying animals by their accents. They also deal with a hen party whose Greek member does not have her passport and a report of a tourist from the Continent urinating in a bush.
3	"Not all Heroes Wear Capes"	Iain Davidson	Unknown	16 March 2018
Complex territorial issues addressed by the independent organisation monitoring the thin dotted line between the EU and the UK. The Patrollers carry out a suspiciously lengthy strip-search on a smuggler, dispose of some controlled explosives with a controlled explosion, and suffer some contentious fallout from a visit to a Mexican restaurant. Meanwhile, the 'virtual border' gets a real grilling from a BBC reporter.

=== Series 2 (2019) ===
No.	Title	Directed by	Written by	Original release date
1	"Embrace All Possibilities"	Keri Collins	Unknown	8 February 2019
Post-Brexit the team deal with smugglers, protests and queries from concerned citizens.
2	"We've Got Your Backs"	Keri Collins	Unknown	15 February 2019
On all terrains they are out in all weathers, and there's big excitement for border resident Penny when megastar meteorologist Barra Best visits her village.
3	"Appearance Is Everything"	Keri Collins	Unknown	22 February 2019
Head of the digital border Niall Sweeney showcases some new technology he is developing for the Soft Border Patrol. Ben and Kris encounter an unusual group, chief executive Lisa McCoy deals with an important London visitor, and the Continuity Nine County Sovereignty Committee put a new plan into action and finally embrace the ballot box.
4	"The Most Important Nothing in Europe"	Keri Collins	Unknown	1 March 2019
Common sense issues like potholes are top of the list for Ben and Kris. Conor and Tracy investigate a local loophole, and Lisa visits everyone's favourite Uncle - Hugo Duncan.
5	"The Light That Guides You Through"	Keri Collins	Unknown	8 March 2019
An Edinburgh politician suggests closer links between Scotland and Northern Ireland - but is it a bridge too far for the SBP? Tracy channels her femme fatale as she and Connor appear on French TV. A mouthy US online talk show host grills Niall. And Ben is stopped in his tracks when his favourite singer is subject to a random check.

=== Series 3 (2020) ===
No.	Title	Directed by	Written by	Original release date
1	"Collaboration"	Keri Collins	Unknown	22 February 2020
With equal marriage legal in Northern Ireland, Ben and Kris encounter equal rights on the border when they meet Hector, the divorce lawyer. The Continuity Nine gang is back with new plans to unite Ulster by harnessing water power, and TV legend Gerry Kelly has a bone to pick with Laurence Lyle.
2	"The Finer Details"	Keri Collins	Unknown	29 February 2020
With Brexit over the line, Lisa meets with her political neighbours, as an Irish politician arrives from Dublin. Niall’s new in car technology throws up a few surprises, and football legend Jackie Fullerton has some advice for the patrollers.
3	"Uncertainty"	Keri Collins	Unknown	7 March 2020
The coastal patrol try to get Michael to come clean when they catch him smuggling illicit washing powder. Niall Sweeney’s feasibility study into the possible bridge between Northern Ireland and Scotland includes some explosive revelations for visiting Scottish politician Erskine Forbes, and Ben and Kris learn not all acronyms are scary.
4	"Change"	Keri Collins	Unknown	20 March 2020
With Brexit, change is on the way. Laurie and Lisa consider a Soft Border Patrol rebrand. Kirsty and Louise are not buzzing about Michael the smuggler's latest scam. Meanwhile, Penny is bricking it about the climate emergency

== See also ==
- Scot Squad
