= Philomena Muinzer =

Dramaturge and former musician

Philomena "Phil" Muinzer is a dramaturge, writer and former musician from Northern Ireland, who has used the pen name Phil O'Brien for some of her work.

== Early life and education ==
Philomena and her twin brother Colum were born in Illinois, United States, of an Irish mother and American father. Her father, Louis A. Muinzer, graduated from Princeton University in 1949, and moved to Belfast to teach at Queen's University Belfast. The family moved to Belfast, Northern Ireland, when the children were young. (Note: Her Facebook page says "From Champaign, Illinois".)

She is a graduate of the University of Essex. She moved to the United States to study geology at Princeton University in 1973, graduating in 1978. She wrote a thesis on Arnold Guyot's barometrical explorations.

This was followed by postgraduate studies at the Yale School of Drama (1980).

== Career ==
While at Princeton, she was disturbed by the sharp contrast between the violence of Belfast and the peace and calm of Princeton, and wrote the play We're on the One Road, about The Troubles in Ireland. It was performed in 1976, cast and directed by Muinzer. The play was a finalist for the Susan Smith Blackburn Prize in 1979–80.

Both Philomena and Colum played in the post-punk rock band Cruella de Ville, formed in 1982.

Philomena Muinzer has served as dramaturge for the Royal National Theatre.

Her 1987 article, "Evacuating the Museum: the Crisis of Playwriting in Ulster", published in New Theatre Quarterly, February 1987, has been extensively quoted in literature about Irish theatre and women playwrights.

As of 2011, Muinzer was working as public relations officer for Pennant Books in London. She was thanked by Matthew Hussey in the foreword to his 2013 book, Get the Guy.

== Selected works ==
Muinzer has written several plays and at least two books, sometimes adopting the pseudonym Phil O'Brien (O'Brien being the Munizers' mother's maiden name):

- We're on the One Road (1976)
- Together Against Him (1982), a play, which was awarded a bursary by The Arts Council of Great Britain and well-reviewed by the Times Literary Supplement
- Memories of the Irish-Israeli War (1995), a novel (as Phil O'Brien)
- Coldplay: Look at the Stars (2004), about the band Coldplay, in particular the effect of fame on frontman Chris Martin (as Phil O'Brien)

== Personal life ==
She was married to writer Colin Bennett until his death on 15 February 2015.
