= The Blizzard of Odd =

- Created by: Colin Murphy
- Starring: Colin Murphy
- Theme music composer: Phil Chevron
- Opening theme: "Television Screen" by Centipede on the Roof.
- Country of origin: Republic of Ireland
- Original language: English

Production
- Running time: 30 minutes (including commercials)
- Production company: MMA Media Productions

Original release
- Network: RTÉ Two
- Release: 4 February 2001 – 2005

Colin Murphy on The Blizzard of Odd's white backdrop

The Blizzard of Odd is an Irish comedy television programme broadcast from 2001–2005 on RTÉ, presented and written by Irish comedian Colin Murphy. The half-hour show (including commercials) was aired usually on Tuesday nights at 22:25 on the RTÉ Two channel.

The programme incorporated a number of segments such as Boggle Box, reviewing the week's television programmes, Made in Ireland, which features clips from various Irish B-movies (including low budget Irish pornography films, which Murphy dubbed "Lepraporn"). Also "reviewed" in comical fashion were bizarre cult material such as recurring favourites Vampyros Lesbos and the Leprechaun film series, plus other segments which varied from week to week.

On one occasion Murphy was reviewing Star Trek, in particular the Star Trek: The Next Generation episode "The High Ground" However, he was unable to show any clips of it, as the episode was banned from broadcast in Ireland and the UK due to a positive reference to Physical force Irish republicanism. Murphy got round the ban by reading out the script of the offending scene, attempting to play both characters (Jean-Luc Picard and Data).

While the show was produced on a small budget – the set for later seasons was simply a white backdrop onto which Murphy occasionally brought props – it remains a cult favourite among sections of the viewing public in Ireland. It is on an indefinite hiatus and hasn't aired since 2005. Although it has been removed from the RTÉ website, the show has yet to be formally cancelled or renewed, leaving it in a state of limbo.

The show's title music was "Television Screen", a cover of The Radiators from Space's 1977 debut single by Centipede on the Roof.

== Controversy ==
In 2005 clips from low-budget 1997 movie Space-jacked were aired on the show. The film featured two actors from soap opera Fair City; Mick Nolan who plays Ray and Ciara O'Callaghan who plays Yvonne. O'Callaghan was noted at the time for appearing naked.
