= Martin Reid (actor) =

British actor and comedian

- Born: 12 January 1964 (age 62); Northern Ireland
- Other name: Marty Reid

Martin "Marty" Reid (12 January 1964) is a Northern Irish actor and comedian, and is part of the Hole in the Wall Gang, a Belfast comedy troupe. He has played the role of staunch loyalist Uncle Andy in the satirical BBC comedy Give My Head Peace since 1997, which was created by and starred the Hole in the Wall Gang. After the success of Give My Head Peace the Gang created a sketch show entitled Dry Your Eyes in 2006, in which Reid played various characters, most notably the Linfield fan Derek and Jonjo 1 of the McDowell brothers. He has also appeared in the 1999 comedy film The Most Fertile Man in Ireland as a barman.
