= St Patrick's Grammar School, Downpatrick =

Coordinates: 54.332°N 5.709°W

Saint Patrick's Grammar School
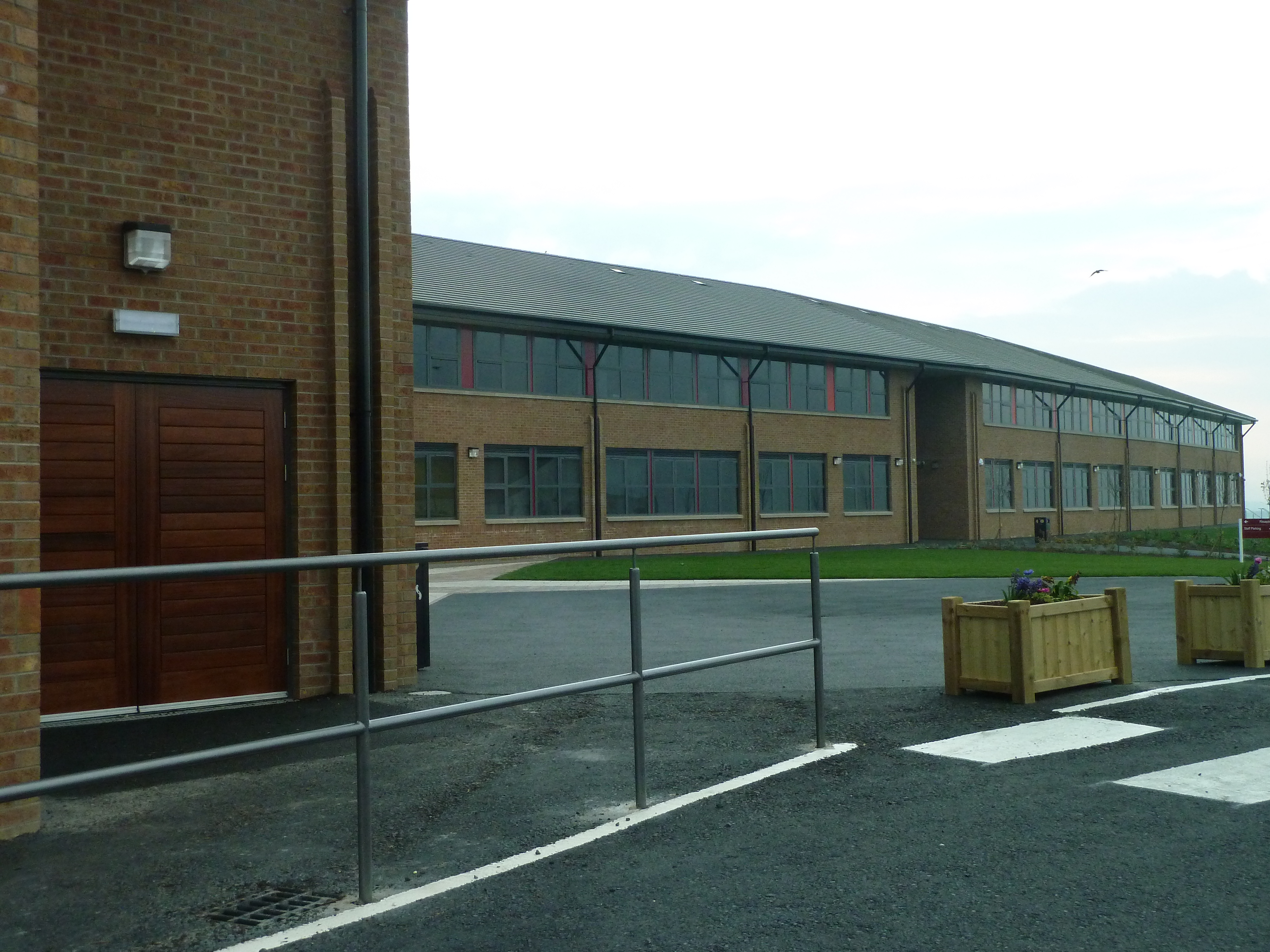

Location
- Saul Street; Downpatrick, County Down, BT30 6NJ; Northern Ireland

Information
- Type: Grammar
- Motto: Signum Fidei ("Sign of faith")
- Religious affiliation: Roman Catholic
- Established: 1934
- Closed: 2024
- Local authority: Education Authority (South Eastern)
- Headmaster: Joe McCann
- Gender: All-Male (Year 8 – Year 12); Co-educational (Year 13 – Year 14)
- Age: 11 to 18
- Enrollment: Approx. 689
- Houses: Down, Killard, Lecale, Quoile
- Colours: Maroon, yellow
- Publication: Pulse
- School Years: Year 8 – Year 14
- Website: www.spgs.org.uk

Saint Patrick's Grammar School was a Catholic grammar school located in Downpatrick, County Down, Northern Ireland. It was owned by the De La Salle Brothers. It had an enrolment of around 725 students, with girls admitted at 6th form level. Pupils came from all over the East Down area. Working to support the ideals of this Lasallian School was a staff of 75 lay teachers. In 2007, the school was awarded the Investor in People award, and has been named a specialist school in humanities by the Department of Education.

The school reopened as part of a merger with St Mary's High and De La Salle in 2024 as Lecale Trinity Grammar School.

== History ==
Saint Patrick's Grammar School was founded in 1934 and moved to its present site in 1937. In 2009, the school celebrated its 75th anniversary. A new school building was built and opened in April 2011. The new building contains improved modern facilities including a large music department and enhanced Physical Education amenities. The PE department includes a modern gym, two indoor sports halls and two floodlit outdoor pitches.

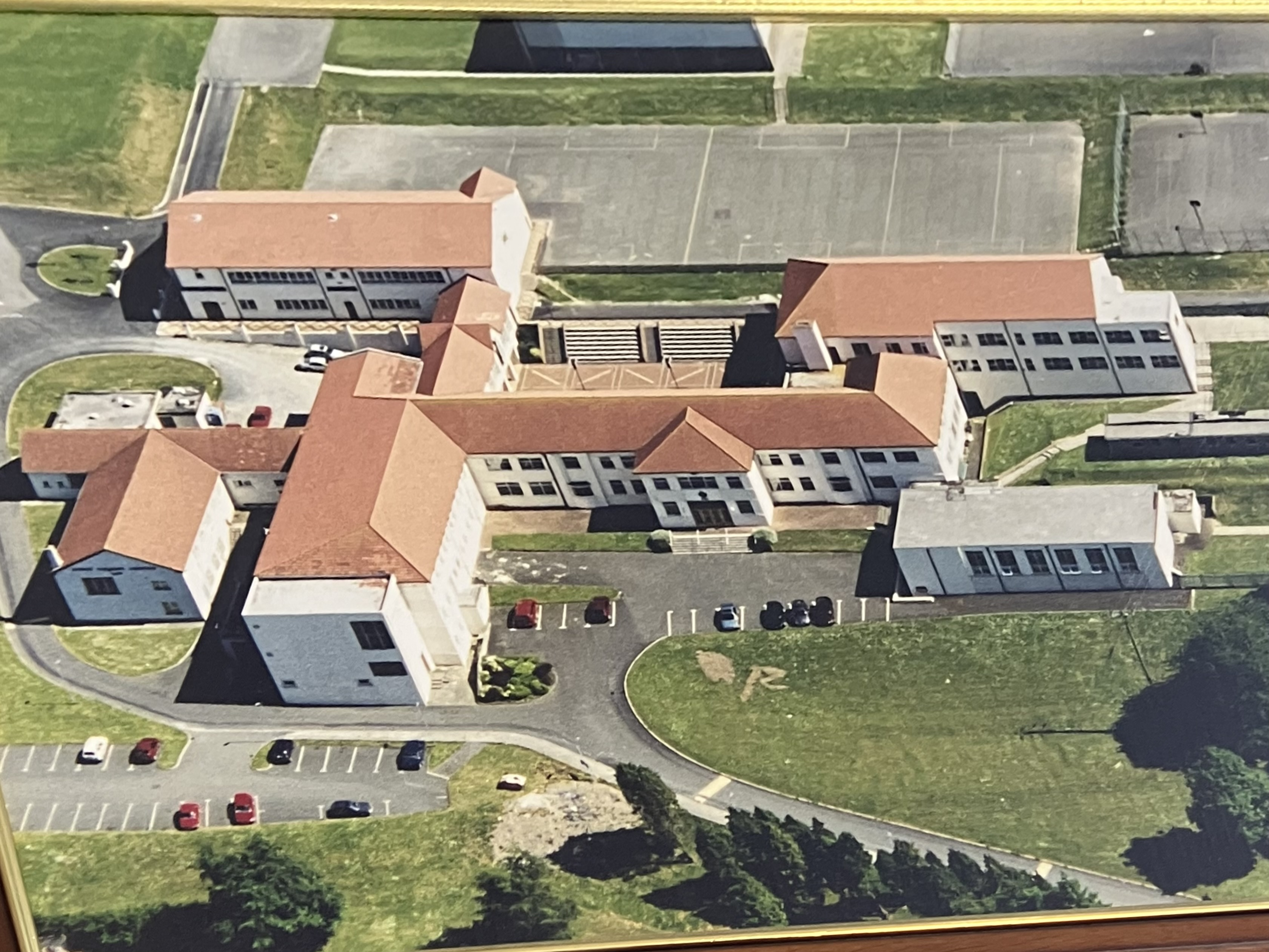
The second Saint Patrick’s Grammar School building, Saul Street, 1937-2011

A controversial merger was proposed between St Patrick's and non-selective schools St Mary's High and De La Salle. The resulting institution would be named Lecale Trinity Grammar and open in September 2024.

== School and community ==
The school and its students are linked with the local community. Extra-curricular organisations such as the St. Vincent de Paul School Conference operate within Saint Patrick's Grammar School to raise funds for worthy causes as well as out in the community, conducting regular visitations to the Lecale Lodge Nursing Home which is operated by Four Seasons Health Care.

In the area of Performing Arts, the school has brought a number of productions to fruition over the years, the most recent being Philadelphia, Here I Come! , The Phantom of the Opera and Oliver! and in its 90th Anniversary and final year - Beauty and the Beast.

The school was involved in many local, county and national leagues in sports such as football, Gaelic football, hurling and athletics. Its sports teams have achieved a number of county and province-wide titles under the guidance of the P.E. Department.

== School houses ==
Upon admission into the school, students where placed into one of four houses (classes). These are:

- Down
- Killard
- Lecale
- Quoile
- Saul (In Year 13/14 only and in practical classes ie. Technology, music and art)

The Saul house is used as a separate class for Creative and Expressive studies in the junior school.

== School building ==
The school once sat on Irish Street where it meets Stream Street in the town centre of Downpatrick. It later moved to its current site accessible via a Saul Street. The site is shared by another De La Salle Brother's school known as De La Salle High School.

The construction of a new school building commenced in the summer of 2009. The school was constructed on the "junior" playing fields, which can be seen on the Downpatrick skyline. When completed, the previous school building was demolished and the site was converted into all-weather playing fields and tennis courts. The new school campus opened on 1 April 2011.

== Notable former students and staff ==
- Patrick Kielty (born 1971) - Presenter of RTÉ's Late Late Show.
- Maurice Hayes (1927-2017) - former Northern Ireland Ombudsman, Chairman of the Ireland Funds and Taoiseach-appointed Senator in Seanad Éireann, he served as town clerk of Downpatrick in the 1960s and was awarded European Person of the Year 2003. Later, he returned to Saint Patrick's to teach.
- Eddie McGrady (1935-2013) - former Social Democratic and Labour Party MP and MLA, who first won his seat in 1987 defeating the Conservative Party candidate Enoch Powell
- Rigsy, (real name David O'Reilly) (born 1978) - TV and radio broadcaster with the BBC presenting on Across The Line and BBC Radio Ulster since 2002
- Gerry Kelly (broadcaster) TV and radio broadcaster formerly at UTV and now with BBC Radio Ulster
- Ian Mitchell from the bands Bay City Rollers and Rosetta Stone
- Members of the band Relish
- Members of the rock band The Answer
- Margaret Ritchie (born 1958) - former MP for South Down, former Social Democratic and Labour Party leader, MLA and Minister for Social Development, who taught in the school for a short period.
- Ryan McMullan, singer songwriter that has toured with Ed Sheeran
- Conor Hazard (born 1998) - goalkeeper for Celtic.
- David Morgan (Northern Irish footballer) (born 1994) - footballer formerly of Nottingham Forest
- Colin Murphy (born 1968) - comedian and broadcaster. Best known as a panellist on BBC Northern Ireland's hit show The Blame Game.
- Kieran Deeny (born 1954) - medical doctor and politician
