= Memories of the Irish-Israeli War =

1995 novel by Phil O'Brien

- First edition
- Author: Phil O'Brien
- Cover artist: Bernard Doyle of Modelbox
- Language: English
- Genre: Satire
- Publisher: New Futurist Books
- Publication date: May 1995
- Publication place: United Kingdom
- Media type: Paperback
- Pages: 263 pp
- ISBN: 1-899690-00-X
- OCLC: 33978661
- Dewey Decimal: 823/.914 21
- LC Class: PR6065.B7437 M46 1995

Memories of the Irish-Israeli War is a 1995 novel by Phil O'Brien, a pen name for Philomena Muinzer. It was published by New Futurist Books, whose directors were Muinzer and her twin brother, Colum (also spelt Colm). The pair were formerly leads and vocalists for post-punk band Cruella de Ville.

== Plot ==
The novel told from the point of view of a waitress from Belfast who calls herself "Poisoner" or "Mad Dog Me", is about a group of illegal Middle Eastern workers calling themselves the "Night Shift", "the Sons of Sheikh Zubair," and "the Sons of Umm Muhammad", at a kebab shop, the Cholman Deli in Leicester Square, who commit acts of terrorism because they desire and have been unable to get British citizenship. Angry about how easily she can get a work visa, being from Ireland, she is treated as a whore by her co-workers, and usually known to them as "the slag". Poisoner steals a rock of plutonium called the Stone of Scone and hides it in an intimate part of her body. This theft helps draw attention to the restaurant.

The book is written in thick Irish dialect and slang, with long compound-complex sentences and lengthy observations and metaphors by its narrator, who can rarely get in a word with the others, and when she does, she rarely displays the intelligence she shows in the narration, speaking in short, inutile blips in even thicker slang.

Sheikh Zubair is ultimately mentioned as being from Stratford-Upon-Avon. The book ends with Ilan married to Zeev's mother and a lengthy sex scene between Zeev and Mad Dog Me.

== Characters ==
- Arkasha, a Russian on an expired visa
- Farid, a Lebanese camp scavenger
- Hamdie, an Egyptian cappuccino boy
- Ilan, the Lexus-driving Boss, also from Israel, absent for the first half of the novel, in search of a wife.
- Moussa, a Syrian D.Phil college student and intellectual.
- Zeev, an Israeli chef who claims to be an antisemitic Jew and a former tank commander.

== Reception ==
A reviewer for New Scientist said that "There’s a real comic gift at work here, as well as a heady delight in the possibilities of language. But only the most patient of readers is likely to make much headway through O’Brien’s hectic prose."
