= The Blame Game (British TV programme) =

Northern Irish comedy panel series

- Title card of The Blame Game
- Genre: Comedy panel game
- Directed by: Fiona Nelson
- Presented by: Tim McGarry
- Starring: Colin Murphy; Neil Delamere; Jake O'Kane (2005–2020); Diona Doherty (2021–present)
- Country of origin: United Kingdom
- No. of seasons: 19
- No. of episodes: 120

Production
- Executive producer: Justin Binding
- Production locations: BBC Northern Ireland's Blackstaff Studio, Belfast
- Camera setup: Multi-camera
- Running time: 29 minutes
- Production company: Moondog Productions

Original release
- Network: BBC One Northern Ireland

The Blame Game is a Northern Irish comedy panel series that has been broadcast on BBC Radio Ulster and later jointly on BBC One Northern Ireland. Starting in 2005, it is hosted by Tim McGarry. Regular panellists include comedians Colin Murphy, Neil Delamere, and, until 2020, Jake O'Kane. Former guest panellist local comedian Diona Doherty, became a regular panellist since series 19. As well as the regular three panellists, they also have a regular guest panellist. The guest panellist is usually a comedian from outside Northern Ireland who is not always as familiar with the complexities of Northern Irish politics which leads to some hilarity.

It is generally filmed at BBC Northern Ireland's Blackstaff House studios in Belfast, but it has in past also been filmed in the Millennium Forum in Derry.

The show was cancelled by the BBC in October 2026 due to financial pressures.

== Format ==
In the first and main round called "Pass the Buck", individual members of the audience ask the contestants who they feel responsible for a topical issue, usually in the structure "Who do you blame for...?" Example issues include binge drinking, the "Stroke City" problem and trick or treating. Tim McGarry passes the question over to a contestant who attempts to answer it, normally in a humorous off-topic manner.

In the second round ("Blame It on the Boogie"), a piece of music is played, and the contestants must try to figure out why it is being played. In recent years, this section has been left out altogether and the initial first round dominates the show.

In the final round ("What's the Story?"), Tim McGarry reads out a recent newspaper headline and the contestants state their take on the headline.

The game ends with Tim McGarry telling the audience if they "blame (team) for winning, to cheer now".

The television version cuts out "Blame It on the Boogie", and the majority of the show consists of "Pass the Buck". With just a few minutes to go, Tim McGarry announces "There's just time to look at this week's news", before getting out a 'newspaper' from which he reads the headlines for "What's the Story?".

== Trivia ==
In the episode that aired after loyalist Michael Stone attempted to assassinate members of Sinn Féin at Stormont in 2006, Tim McGarry joked that Stone would claim that this it was a work of performance art. During his trial in 2008, Stone claimed that he had no intention of killing Gerry Adams and Martin McGuinness, and that it was all a work of performance art.
