= Rigsy =

British DJ and journalist (born 1978)

- Born: David O’Reilly; 6 December 1978 (age 47); Newcastle, Northern Ireland
- Education: St Patrick's Grammar School, Downpatrick; Queen's University Belfast
- Spouse: Lisa
- Awards: PPI Awards (2008, 2009, 2016)
- Presenting career
- Show: Across The Line
- Station: BBC Radio Ulster

Rigsy (born David O’Reilly, 6 December 1978) is a presenter from Newcastle, Northern Ireland, currently living in East Belfast. He attended St Patrick's Grammar School, Downpatrick is a graduate of Queen's University Belfast.

== Broadcast career ==
Rigsy has presented Across The Line on BBC Radio Ulster since 2002 and over 30 episodes of ATL TV on BBC Two Northern Ireland. Rigsy currently presents Across The Line with fellow broadcaster and journalist Stuart Bailie, having previously presented the show solo and alongside Donna Legge.

== Awards ==
In 2008, Across the Line (with Rigsy presenting solo) won gold at the PPI Awards (the Irish equivalent of the Radio Academy Awards). Rigsy and his producer Paul McClean picked up the award, as well as another gold in the documentary category for A Beautiful Day, a programme Rigsy had voiced and McClean produced. In 2009 and 2016 Across the Line won gold again.

== TV work ==
Rigsy has interviewed many well known and respected acts and musicians, including Noel Gallagher, Kings of Leon, Pete Doherty, Jarvis Cocker, Ian Brown, Muse, Franz Ferdinand, Snow Patrol, Primal Scream, The Prodigy, The Killers, The Chemical Brothers, The Flaming Lips, Underworld and Steve Coogan while primarily promoting new Northern Irish acts such as And So I Watch You From Afar, General Fiasco, Two Door Cinema Club, and SOAK. He has also presented the BBC's coverage of Tennents ViTal in 2006 and 2007, 'ATL Rockschool' in 2006, 2007 and 2008, 'ATL At the Festivals' in 2008, 'Do You Remember the First Time?' in 2009, 'Snow Patrol at Ward Park' in 2010 and coverage of 'One Big Weekend' in 2013. He has also presented and contributed to various other non-music TV programmes, including coverage of Balmoral Show and The Twelfth.

== Music journalism and other related work ==
Rigsy has worked on many projects outside of the BBC, hosting the Choice Music Prize (Ireland's answer to the Mercury Music Prize) in Dublin twice (in 2007 and 2008) before judging the same award in 2009 and 2012. In early 2007 he was nominated in the media personality category at the Northern Ireland Fate Awards. As a print journalist, Rigsy worked alongside Colin Murray at Blank Magazine and BBM at the end of the 1990s, before contributing to the NME as Northern Ireland correspondent for two years. He currently writes a weekly column for The Daily Mirror. He has also performed with a Northern Irish band called Roque Junior, taking to the stage at venues such as the Ulster Hall and The Ambassador, Dublin.

== DJ work ==
Rigsy is also a DJ primarily promoting and DJing at club night "Sketchy" and various other events at The Limelight while regularly appearing at other club nights across Northern Ireland. He has also played a number of major music festivals including Tennents Vital, Belsonic, Oxegen Festival and The Electric Picnic

== Personal life ==
Rigsy lives in East Belfast with his wife, Lisa.
