= BJ Hogg =

Northern Irish actor (1955–2020)

- Born: William Henry Brian Hogg; 30 April 1955; Lisburn
- Died: 30 April 2020 (aged 65)
- Notable work: Give My Head Peace, Game of Thrones, The Fall

William Henry Brian Hogg (30 April 1955 – 30 April 2020), better known by his stage name BJ Hogg, was a Northern Irish actor best known for playing Big Mervyn in the BBC sitcom Give My Head Peace. He also played the title role in the Oscar-nominated short film Dance Lexie Dance and appeared as Addam Marbrand in Game of Thrones.

== Personal life ==
He was born in Lisburn on 30 April 1955. He had two sisters, one his twin. He originally trained to be a chef, but stopped working in hotels after two of them were bombed while on duty. He spent several years as a musician before turning to acting.

He married his wife, Elish, in 1981.

== Career ==
=== Stage ===
He appeared in the Arts and Lyric theatres in Northern Ireland as well as on stage in London and Moscow.

=== Television ===
As well as Give My Head Peace and Game of Thrones, he appeared in The Fall as the father of a murder victim and The Frankenstein Chronicles.

=== Film ===
As well as Dance Lexie Dance, he starred in City of Ember, Hunger, Closing the Ring and Divorcing Jack.

== Death ==
He died at home on his 65th birthday on 30 April 2020.

== Filmography ==
| Year | Title | Role | Notes |
|---|---|---|---|
| 1986 | The End of the World Man | Foreman | |
| 1986 | Eat the Peach | Danny | |
| 1995 | Nothing Personal | Jake | |
| 1996 | Past Into Present | Narrator | |
| 1997 | The Second Jungle Book: Mowgli & Baloo | Col. Reece | |
| 1997 | A Further Gesture | Albert | |
| 1997 | The Informant | Constable Goss | |
| 1998 | Resurrection Man | Hacksaw McGrath | |
| 1998 | The Brylcreem Boys | Sean | |
| 1998 | Titanic Town | Chair | |
| 1998 | Divorcing Jack | Billy McCoubrey | |
| 1999 | The Harpist | Vinz | |
| 1999 | Sunset Heights | Minister | |
| 2002 | Puckoon | Rafferty | |
| 2004 | Mickybo and Me | Sydney | |
| 2006 | Small Engine Repair | Bar Character / Engine repair customer | |
| 2007 | Closing the Ring | Maguigan | |
| 2008 | Hunger | Loyalist Orderly | |
| 2008 | Peacefire | Fatboy | |
| 2008 | City of Ember | Mayor's Guard | |
| 2011 | Your Highness | Royal Advisor | |
| 2016 | Property of the State | Michael Pat | |
| 2020 | The Windermere Children | Dr. Willenshaw | |
