= Maurice Hayes =

Irish public servant (1927–2017)

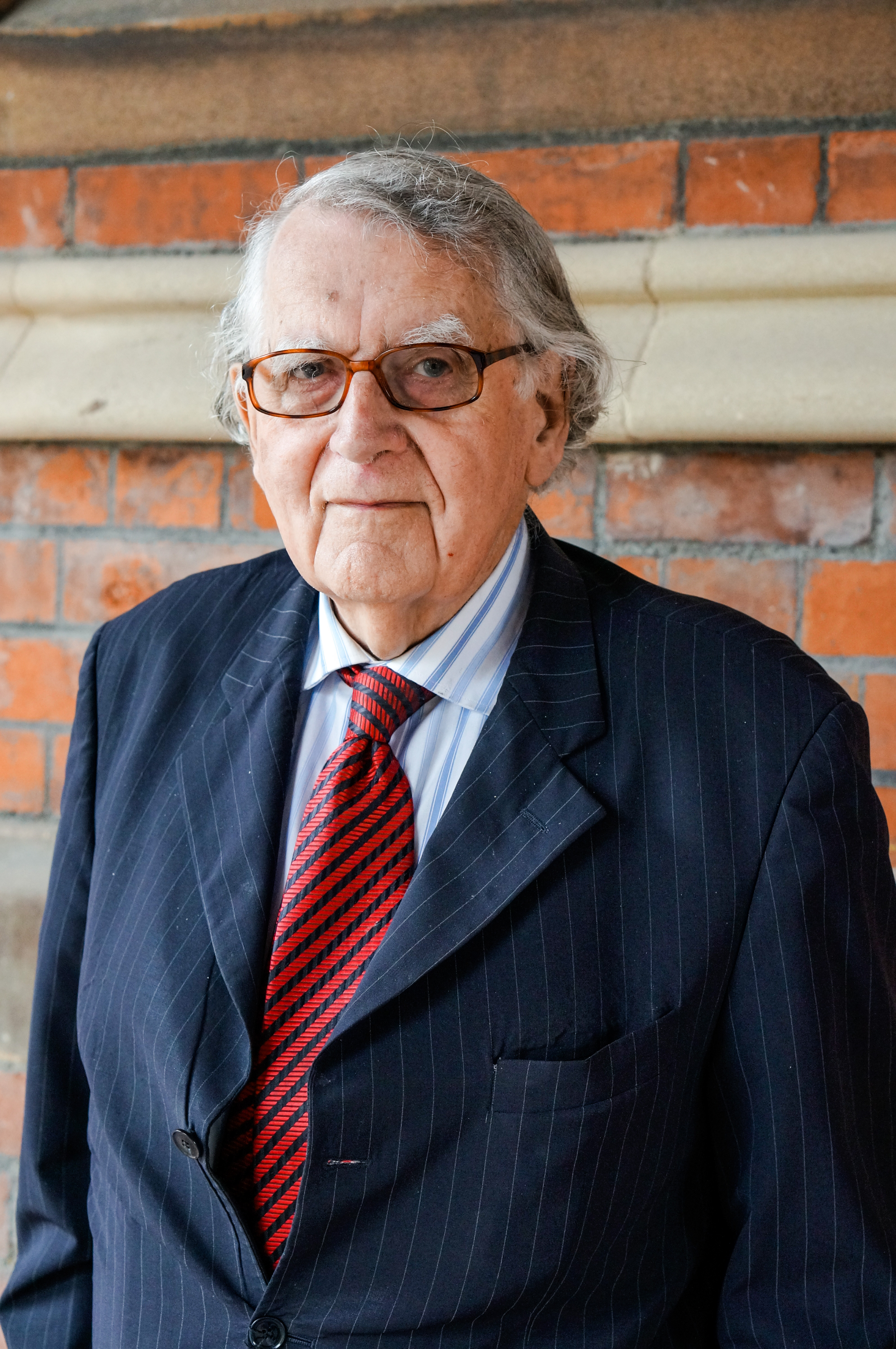

Senator
- In office 17 September 1997 – 13 September 2007
- Constituency: Nominated by the Taoiseach

Personal details
- Born: 8 July 1927 Killough, County Down, Northern Ireland
- Died: 23 December 2017 (aged 90) Downpatrick, County Down, Northern Ireland
- Party: Independent
- Spouse: Johanna Hayes (m. 1967)
- Children: 5
- Education: Queen's University Belfast
- Profession: Author; Academic; Civil Servant; Politician

Maurice Hayes (8 July 1927 – 23 December 2017) was an Irish public servant and, late in life, an independent member of both the 21st and 22nd Seanad. Hayes was nominated by the Taoiseach, Bertie Ahern, in 1997 and re-nominated in 2002. He also served, at the Taoiseach's request, as Chairman of the National Forum on Europe in the Republic of Ireland.

Hayes was voted European Person of the Year in 2003.

== Early life ==
Hayes was born in Killough, County Down, Northern Ireland, in 1927, the second last of six siblings; he had a twin sister, Carmel. He completed a PhD in English at the Queen's University Belfast, then taught at St Patrick's Grammar School in Downpatrick. He left teaching to become town clerk of Downpatrick the then administrative centre of County Down, succeeding his father in the role.

== Public service career ==
In the troubled politics of Northern Ireland, where political parties tend to be sharply split along pseudo-ethno-nationalistic lines, Hayes was viewed as an even-handed observer. He wrote or contributed to major policy reports, such as the Patten Commission dealing with reforms to the Royal Ulster Constabulary (RUC), the police force later renamed the Police Service of Northern Ireland (PSNI).

== Writing ==
Hayes also wrote numerous pieces of journalism, notably, and regularly, for the Irish Independent. He was the author of three books of memoirs, Sweet Killough: Let Go Your Anchor; Black Puddings with Slim: A Downpatrick Boyhood; and Minority Verdict: Experiences Of A Catholic Civil Servant, as well as author or editor of works on conflict research, community relations and Irish writing.

== Memberships ==
Hayes was a former Northern Ireland Ombudsman and Boundary Commissioner, and was Permanent Secretary of the Department of Health and Social Services. He was a former chairman of the Community Relations Council and the Acute Hospitals Review Group.

He was chairman of The Ireland Funds in the Republic of Ireland, a branch of a major charitable group with worldwide contributors, which has made significant grants to groups dealing with social and business problems.

Hayes was also a long-serving non-executive director of Independent News & Media Plc, retiring in 2009 towards the culmination of a long running battle for control of the group between the O'Reilly family and Denis O'Brien led to a re-structuring of the Board.

Hayes was nominated by the Taoiseach, Bertie Ahern, in 1997 and re-nominated in 2002.

He also served, at the Taoiseach's request, as Chairman of the National Forum on Europe in the Republic of Ireland. The approach he devised to educate the population on the arguments over European issues was so successful that many other European countries adopted similar methods.

In later life, Hayes was a member of the Royal Irish Academy and the Research Ethical Committee of Queen's University Belfast medical school, and a governor of the Linenhall Library, Belfast. He was a long-serving member of the Scholarship Board of the O'Reilly Foundation. He was also a board member at Regtel.

Hayes was asked by Mary Harney, when she was the Minister for Health in the Republic of Ireland, and the HSE to conduct a review into a scandal in the radiology department at Tallaght Hospital on the outskirts of Dublin.

== Personal life ==
Hayes was a county hurler, who in the mid-1950s became County Secretary of the Down Gaelic Athletic Association (GAA) and set a ten-year plan for the county football team to become the first from Northern Ireland to win an All-Ireland football final. Within five years, Down had won their first All-Ireland trophy in 1960. They followed it with further successes in 1961, 1968, 1991 and 1994. No other Northern team won an All-Ireland title until Derry won the football title in 1993.

He married Joan in 1967 and they had five children. Hayes died in Downe Hospital after a long illness on 23 December 2017 at the age of 90 and was buried near the supposed grave of Saint Patrick in Down Church of Ireland graveyard.

== Awards ==
Hayes was voted European Person of the Year in 2003.

He also received honorary doctorates from his alma mater; from both Queen's University Belfast and University of Ulster in the UK, as well as Trinity College, University of Dublin and National University of Ireland in the Republic of Ireland.
