= Damon Quinn =

Northern Irish actor

- Born: 12 April 1964 (age 62); Belfast Northern Ireland

Damon Quinn (born 12 April 1964) is a Northern Irish actor, writer and producer. He is a member of the Hole in the Wall Gang comedy group. Quinn also produced "The Crush" a short film nominated for an Academy award (Best Live-action short) in 2011.

He is best known for the Northern Irish television comedy Give My Head Peace where he stars as Cal. He also appears in the comedy Dry Your Eyes as many characters including Angry Steve. Despite his comedy background, Quinn is a keen historian.
