= Colin Murphy (comedian) =

Northern Irish comedian

- Born: Colin Murphy; 16 July 1968 (age 58); Downpatrick, County Down, Northern Ireland
- Notable work: The Blizzard of Odd; The Panel; The Blame Game

Colin Murphy (born 16 July 1968) is a Northern Irish comedian from Downpatrick, County Down, Northern Ireland. He now lives in south Belfast. He is best known for his television work hosting and co-writing The Blizzard of Odd, The Unbelievable Truth, and as resident panellist on The Blame Game for BBC Northern Ireland and The Panel for RTÉ.

He has also acted in the film Divorcing Jack with Rachel Griffiths and David Thewlis.

== Public appearances ==
Murphy mainly tours in Ireland and usually hosts the comedy show in The Empire Bar, Belfast. He occasionally appears at other venues in the UK such as the Edinburgh Fringe Festival, and has performed at Kilkenny Cat Laughs, Melbourne Comedy Festival, and Just for Laughs. He was host of Queen's Comedy Club, which ran in the Mandela Hall of the Queen's University Belfast Students' Union until 2018.

== Television credits ==
Murphy has appeared on the following programmes:

- Elvis Has Left the Building
- This Is Ireland
- All New Comedy Store (Five & Paramount)
- Comic Asides 2
- Hey Hey It’s Saturday (Channel 9 Australia)
- The Stand Up Show
- Don't Shoot the Messenger
- The Return of the Empire
- Something for the Weekend
- Eureka Street
- Big Bad World
- People Like Us
- I Fought the Law
- Colin Murphy's Paper Chase
- Colin Murphy's Great Unanswered Questions
- "The Blizzard of Odd" (RTÉ)
- The Panel (RTÉ)
- The Blame Game
- "Xit File" (RTÉ)
- "Xit Poll" (RTÉ)
- "The Will of the People"
- "Ad Fads"
- "TV Fads"
- "Hey Ho Lets Go!" (RTÉ)
- Colin Murphy's Panic Room (BBC 1)

== Philanthropy ==
Murphy has done charity work for Plan Ireland, including making a film about work done by the charity.
