= Neil Delamere =

Irish comedian

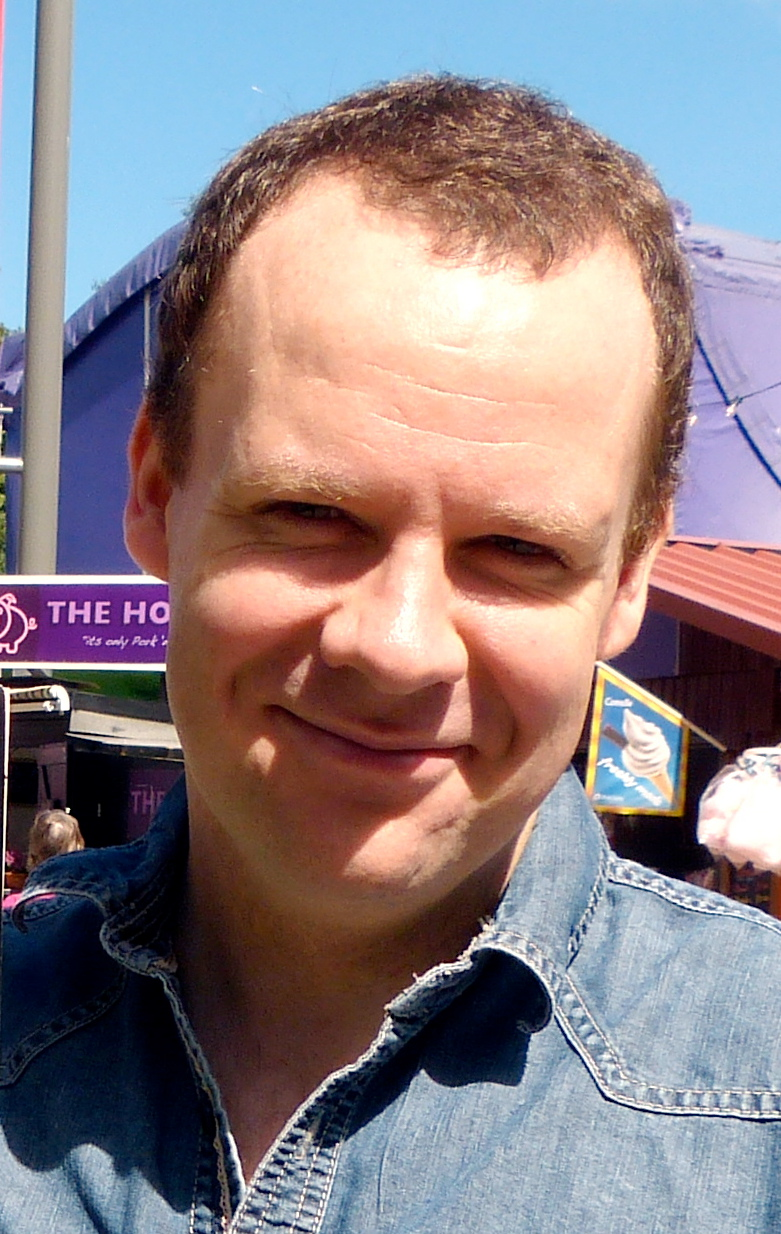
- Delamere in 2013
- Born: 1979 (age 46–47); Edenderry, County Offaly, Ireland
- Website: www.neildelamere.com

Neil Dobby Delamere (/ˈdɛləmiər/ DEL-ə-meer; born 1979) is an Irish comedian. He is a regular on the BBC Northern Ireland television show The Blame Game, and was the BBC Fighting Talk Champion of Champions in 2022.

== Early life and education ==
Delamere is from Edenderry, County Offaly. He has a degree in Computer Applications from Dublin City University (DCU).

== Career ==
He began his career in 2004 at the Edinburgh Festival. Since then he has worked for both Raidió Teilifís Éireann (RTÉ) and the BBC, in programmes such as the BBC comedy series One Night Stand, BBC radio and television panel quiz The Blame Game and RTÉ topical comedy show The Panel. He hosted Neil Delamere's Just For Laughs, a comedy television show in which he interviewed acts performing at the Montreal Festival. He featured on Michael McIntyre's Comedy Roadshow on 4 July 2009. Delamere made his debut appearance on Radio Five Live's panel show Fighting Talk, broadcast on 11 December 2010, and won.

In 2011, he hosted The Only Viking in the Village on RTÉ, in which he explored his Viking roots. The show was nominated in the factual category for an Irish Film and Television Award, and won. He has also acted as a stand-in for John Murray on RTÉ Radio 1.

He presented the comedy documentary There's Something about Patrick which aired on 14 March 2013 on RTÉ 1.

Delamere has also worked for Today FM, where he presented his own show, Neil Delamere's Sunday Best, which aired on Sundays.

== Selected television credits ==
- The Panel (RTÉ Two/One)
- Neil Delamere's Just For Laughs (RTÉ Two)
- The Blame Game (BBC)
- The World Stands Up (Paramount)
- Republic of Telly (RTÉ Two)
- Michael McIntyre's Comedy Roadshow (BBC One)
- There's Something about Patrick (RTÉ One) - 2013
- Holding out for a Hero (RTÉ Two) - 2014
- Ireland's Fittest Family, Celebrity Special (RTÉ One) - 2021
- Dancing With the Stars, fifth Irish series (2022)
