= Riverside Theatre, Coleraine =

Former university theatre in Northern Ireland

Coordinates: 55.147°N 6.672°W

The Riverside Theatre is a former theatre located at the Coleraine campus of Ulster University in Northern Ireland. It was opened in 1976 and was the fifth-largest professional theatre in Northern Ireland. The building was architecturally unique in Northern Ireland for its flexible staging facilities. The Riverside Theatre won a design award in the year of its completion, and another shortly after for its provision for disabled patrons.

It was an established touring venue up until closure. It featured productions from all over the UK, Europe and North America. The Riverside programme incorporated drama, contemporary dance, rock bands, ballet, opera, variety, children's shows, pantomime, music recitals and recordings for television and radio.

In August 2025 the theatre was permanently closed following the end of funding received from Ulster University.
