= Cruella de Ville =

Northern Irish rock band

Cruella De Ville
- Also known as: "Cruella"
- Origin: Northern Ireland
- Genres: Post-punk, gothic rock
- Years active: 1982–1985
- Label: Good Vibrations/EMI/CPL
- Past members: Colum Muinzer; Philomena Muinzer; James Clenaghan; Stephen Mulholland (1982); Mike Edgar (after 1st single)

Cruella de Ville, formerly known as Blazer, was a band from Northern Ireland that presented a mixture of post-punk and gothic rock from 1982 to 1984. They were mostly a studio band, who performed on television on at least two occasions and released a number of singles. Their best-known song is "Those Two Dreadful Children", and their re-released single "I'll Do the Talking" topped the Irish charts in 1985.

Their members consisted of Colum (Colin) Muinzer (later also known as Colin Gibson) on vocals, guitar (often bowed), and violin; his twin sister, Philomena Muinzer (known as "Phil" or "Mena" and later writing under the pen name Phil O'Brien), on vocals and keyboard, James Clenaghan on bass guitar and backing vocals, and Mike Edgar on drums and backing vocals.

== History ==
The band started out as a cover band called Blazer, changing their name after wanting to produce their own material.

Their debut single, "Those Two Dreadful Children"/"Drunken Uncle John" was released on Good Vibrations, and Polydor showed interest, but did not follow up. Stephen Mulholland was replaced by Mike Edgar after this single, and Michael Clifford became their manager.

"Those Two Dreadful Children" appeared on The Dr. Demento Show and was included (transferred from a copy of the vinyl single) on a "Basement Tapes" members-only compilation.

The band appeared on RTÉ's Anything Goes in January 1983, and in March 1983 a new music video for ""Gypsy Girl". (YouTube). 26 February 2023." aired on Channel 4's The Tube. The latter led to a deal with EMI Records on 17 March 1983 (St Patrick's Day), which released a few singles in 1983 and 1984. An album was planned and partially produced by Roy Wood, who became ill, and the album was never released. A 2008 newspaper report suggested that Edgar had "absconded with the recordings".

They played live at Stringfellows nightclub in Covent Garden, London.

In 1985 the band left EMI but re-released the singles "I'll Do the Talking", which topped the Irish charts.

== Music ==
The band's songs include "Drunken Uncle John", "Hong Kong Swing", "Blues, Blues, Blues", "Gypsy Girl", "I'll Do The Talking", "Oceans", and "Who's at the Door?". "Drunken Uncle John" and "Oceans" have a similar dark comic flavour to that found in "Those Two Dreadful Children" – the latter being an absurdist satire on drug dealing. "Hong Kong Swing" is a send-up of Ugly American Naval officers' mangling pan-Asia into a cartoonish red-light concept. There are three versions: the first recorded was the "Manic Mix", with breakdancing cues, which was followed by the regular version. The last, "Hollywood Hong Kong Swing" is a new recording that adds three new introductions: a string soundalike to Alfred Newman's 20th Century Fox Fanfare (with Cinemascope extension), a long guitar solo, and a new verse introducing the song as if being featured in a Hollywood revue. "I'll Do the Talking" is a serious song of sibling devotion. "Marching" aka "I can hear the tanks roll", unreleased but now available on video channels, seems to be about The Troubles, with lyrics also mentioning gunfire.

The Muinzers, usually individually, did all the group's songwriting.

In addition to television performances, the group cut a music video for "Gypsy Girl" that UK television was not allowed to show before 10 pm because it depicted a bonfire. A more simple video was made for the song that simply depicts the band performing was used for daytime showings.

Phil and Colum cite their major influences as coming from their father's old record collection, artists like Spike Jones, Danny Kaye, and Pete Seeger. Colin in particular modelled his guitar playing on Brian May of Queen.

The original demo of "Who's at the Door?" has been transferred to digital and cleaned by Colum Muinzer. A pre-FM copy of a BBC Radio 1 session (possibly broadcast on the Annie Nightingale show in ?1984) was rediscovered, a copy of which was passed on to Colum and Philomena.

== Line-up ==
- Colm Muinzer - guitars, vocals
- Philomena Muinzer - lead vocals, keyboards
- James Clenaghan - bass, vocals
- Mike Edgar - drums, taking over from Stephen Mulholland in 1982

Phil and Colum were twins, born in Illinois, United States, of an Irish mother and American father. The family had moved to Belfast, Northern Ireland, when the children were young.

Philomena Muinzer is a graduate of the University of Essex, Princeton University and Yale School of Drama. She has written plays, articles, and books. She also published under the name Phil O'Brien (O'Brien being the Muinzers' mother's maiden name):

- Memories of the Irish-Israeli War (1995), a novel
- Coldplay: Look at the Stars (2004), about the band Coldplay, in particular the effect of fame on frontman Chris Martin

Mike Edgar had previously played with The Peasants, and later worked for the BBC.

=== Drummers ===
Roy Wood, who produced most of the later releases as well as the unreleased tracks, played drums on "Hong Kong Swing" and Stephen Mulholland played them on "Those Two Dreadful Children." A drum machine was used on "Drunken Uncle John," with Mike Edgar overdubbing the bass drum; and a drum loop used on "Gypsy Girl," again with Edgar doing a few overdubs. All the drums on the unreleased album were played by Wood.

== Discography ==
=== 7" Singles ===
Year	Record Label	Catalogue Number	Songs
1982	Good Vibrations	GOT 16	Drunken Uncle John/Those Two Dreadful Children
1982	Good Vibrations/Polydor	GOOD 1	Those Two Dreadful Children/Drunken Uncle John (Alternate Mix)
1982	Good Vibrations	GOOD 2	I'll Do The Talking/Blues, Blues, Blues
1983	EMI (Great Britain)	EMI 5412	Gypsy Girl/Blues, Blues, Blues (Alternate Mix)
1983	EMI (West Germany)	1 C 006 1078177	Gypsy Girl/Blues, Blues, Blues (Alternate Mix)
1984	Parlophone	R 6075	Hong Kong Swing/Drunken Uncle John (Rerecording)
1984	CPL/Pinnacle	CPL-5	I'll Do The Talking(Alternate Mix)/Hollywood Hong Kong Swing/Oceans
1984	CPL/Priority	CPL-5	I'll Do The Talking(Alternate Mix)/Hollywood Hong Kong Swing/Oceans
1984	CPL/EMI	CPL-5	I'll Do The Talking (Alternate Mix)/Hollywood Hong Kong Swing/Oceans

=== 12" Singles ===
Year	Record Label	Catalogue Number	Songs
1983	EMI	12EMI 5412	Gypsy Girl/Blues, Blues, Blues (Alternate Mix) /Gypsy Girl (Edit)
07/1984	Parlophone	12R 6075	Hong Kong Swing (Manic Mix) /Hong Kong Swing/Drunken Uncle John (Rerecording)

=== Known acetates ===
Year	Record Label	Catalogue Number	Songs
1984	Abbey Road Studios		Hong Kong Swing (Alternate Mix)

=== Online releases ===
Year	Recording	Songs
2011	Digital	Who's at the Door?
2012	Digital	Those Two Dreadful Children
2012	Digital	Drunken Uncle John
2012	Digital	I'll Do The Talking

=== Known demos ===
Year	Recording	Songs
1984	Original Cassette	Who's at the Door?

=== Known recordings ===
Year	Recording	Songs
1982	Good Vibrations / Polydor: master tape	Drunken Uncle John / Those Two Dreadful Children
1984?	BBC Radio: Pre FM master tape	Gypsy Girl / I'll Do The Talking / Marching
-	Trident Studios, 2" master	Opus1 / Gypsy Girl
-	JAM Studios, 2" master	Gypsy Girl / Blues, Blues, Blues
-	DJM Studios, 2" master	Hong Kong Swing / Uncle John / Two Dreadful Children / I'll Do the Talking / Meena Mina / I Can Hear The Tanks Roll / Oceans of Potions / Big Boy
-	DJM Studios, 2" master	Who's at the Door / Toy Box
-	Trident Studios, ¼" master	Tones / Gypsy Girl (Red Hot Polka)
-	SARM Studios, ½" master	Hong Kong Swing No. 1, No. 2 & No. 3
-	¼" master tape	Drunken Uncle John / Those Two Dreadful Children
-	DJM Studios, ½" master	Drunken Uncle John / Who's at the Door / Oceans of Potions / Hong Kong Swing / Marching / Still She Wished for Company / Hong Kong Swing (2nd mix)
-	DJM Studios, ½" master	Hong Kong Swing / Oceans of Potions
-	DJM Studios, ½" master	Hong Kong Swing 7" / Hong Kong Swing 12" / Marching – Gig mix / Gypsy Girl – Gig mix
-	DJM Studios, ½" master	I'll Do The Talking
-	DJM Studios, ¼" master	Hong Kong Swing
-	DJM Studios, ¼" master	I'll Do The Talking / Gypsy Girl / Hong Kong Swing
-	EMI Studios, ¼" master	Toy Box / Hong Kong Swing
-	¼" master	Away We Go
-	Downtown Radio, ¼" master	I'll Do The Talking / Line Up
-	Downtown Radio, ¼" master	Red Hot Mamma / Piano & vocal / Melody Medley

=== CD ===
In the absence of an official release, a fan-based CD has been compiled with the following songs:

1. Hong Kong Swing
2. Gypsy Girl
3. Blues, Blues, Blues
4. I'll Do The Talking
5. Hollywood Hong Kong Swing
6. Who's At The Door?
7. Oceans
8. Those Two Dreadful Children [2007 remix]
9. Drunken Uncle John [second version]
10. Hong Kong Swing [manic mix]

Most songs have been restored from a vinyl source, others have been donated by Philomena and Colum, who encouraged the fan to sell the discs for a profit because he had put so much work into it.

=== CD single ===
The GOT 16 single; "Those Two Dreadful Children"/ "Drunken Uncle John", has been turned into a CD single by the same fan. Using a copy of the original Polydor master tape (provided by Colum), artwork for this CD was reworked from a scan of the original poster cover.

== Videos ==
The following video clips of CDV are known to exist

- Drunken Uncle John: Promo video (a slightly different version than the GOT 16 single release)
- Gypsy Girl: EMI's famous "fire" video (which got semi banned by the BBC)
- Gypsy Girl: As above, though with a different intro section
- Gypsy Girl: The band's video recorded on the stage of UK's The Tube
- Hong Kong Swing: Promo video for the single
- I'll Do The Talking: TV appearance on an unknown show (possibly from 'Anything Goes' in January 1983)
