= Phonographic Performance Ireland =

Phonographic Performance Ireland CLG (PPI) is a music licensing company which controls the public performance, broadcasting, reproduction of recording, and other rights of the recordings under its jurisdiction, which comprise the recordings of several different labels in Ireland. PPI collects the copyright royalties for performances or reproductions on behalf of the Irish labels.

These include not only Irish recordings but also most recordings available worldwide. A "public performance" occurs whenever recordings are played to anyone outside the family or domestic circle for profit. The list of recordings in PPI's repertoire is constantly increasing as new titles are released.
