= Tim McGarry =

Irish comedian and actor

- Born: 23 June 1964 (age 61); Belfast, Northern Ireland
- Occupations: Comedian, actor

Tim McGarry is an Irish comedian and actor from North Belfast in Northern Ireland. He was educated at St Malachy's College, Belfast.

He is a member of the comedy group Hole In The Wall Gang, and played "Da", a fictional Sinn Féin spokesman (later MLA), in the comedy series Give My Head Peace.

He has also hosted several radio programmes on BBC Radio Ulster, including weekly comedy quiz The Blame Game. For a number of years he provided a monologue played over the ending credits of the weekly politics show, Hearts and Minds, in the guise of a Belfast 'black taxi' driver.

McGarry is a humanist and in 2016 was appointed a patron of Humanists UK and Northern Ireland Humanists, its branch working for a secular state and the promotion of humanism in Northern Ireland.

He is a fan of Cliftonville F.C. and Leeds United F.C.
