= Hole in the Wall Gang (comedy) =

Northern Irish comedy group

The Hole in the Wall Gang
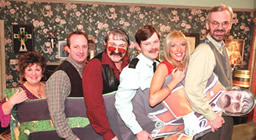
- Notable work: Two Ceasefires and a Wedding; Give My Head Peace; A Perforated Ulster; Dry Your Eyes

Comedy career
- Medium: Sketch comedy; Sitcom
- Members: Tim McGarry; Damon Quinn; Marty Reid; Michael McDowell

The Hole in the Wall Gang is the name of a comedy group from Northern Ireland, who came to prominence in the mid-1990s with the extremely popular satirical comedy Give My Head Peace.

The line up consists of Tim McGarry, Damon Quinn, Marty Reid and Michael McDowell, all of whom were born in 1964. They were originally known as the "Hole in the Wall Theatre Company", before adopting the name Hole in the Wall Gang when they moved to television.

In 1992, the group won a UK Sony Award for Best Radio Comedy for their first radio series A Perforated Ulster. They then won a Royal Television Society Award for Best Regional Programme in 1996, for Two Ceasefires and a Wedding, the prelude to Give My Head Peace. A Perforated Ulster won a Celtic Media Festival award in 2019.

The success of Give My Head Peace led to a new sketch show in 2006 entitled Dry Your Eyes, two series of which were broadcast on BBC One Northern Ireland before being cancelled. Since then, they have worked on several films, scripts and non-comedy television and radio shows, examples including Pop Goes Northern Ireland, a documentary series, and The Titanic Inquiry, also a film.

Give My Head Peace returned for a special on 28 December 2016 called 'The Farce Awakens and the series returned with an 11th series on 19 January 2018.
