= Paul Clark (presenter) =

Northern Irish television presenter and journalist

Paul Clark MBE
- Born: Paul Thompson Clark; 4 December 1953 (age 71) Belfast, Northern Ireland
- Occupation: Broadcaster; Journalist
- Spouse: Carol

Paul Thompson Clark MBE (born 4 December 1953, Belfast) is a Northern Irish television presenter and journalist. He is currently a presenter and reporter for UTV Live.

== Broadcasting career ==
Clark was among the original presenters on RTÉ Radio 2 in 1979 and later presented on BBC Radio Ulster. Other early television programmes Clark presented were Green Rock in 1979 with Caron Keating and Advice Line for the BBC.

Clark moved from presenting and reporting for BBC Northern Ireland's Inside Ulster to Ulster Television in 1989. In his time at UTV, he has been a presenter and reporter on the evening news magazines Six Tonight and UTV Live, Witness Review and UTV School Choir of the Year. He has also contributed to historical and religious documentaries including We Were Brothers, and memorial services for the 10th anniversary of the Remembrance Day bombing in 1997 and Belfast's hosting of Holocaust Memorial Day in 2004.

== Personal life ==
He was born in Belfast and attended St Mary's Christian Brothers' Grammar School, Belfast. He is married to Carol and has two sons, Peter and David. He is a practising Presbyterian, though he was brought up Roman Catholic. Clark is patron of the Northern Ireland Hospice.

In June 2015, Clark was awarded an honorary degree by the Ulster University for services to broadcasting and his charity work with UNICEF.
