= Political editor =

Senior reporter covering politics

The political editor of a newspaper or broadcaster is the senior political reporter who covers politics and related matters for the newspaper or station. They may have a large team of political correspondents working under them.

In publishing, because of their seniority, a political editor's byline is often added to stories that actually are the work of more junior colleagues to give the story more credibility and to indicate their seniority within the publication. The political editor usually carries out the major interviews with a country's prime minister and senior government figures and covers major events like party conferences.

== United Kingdom ==
=== Broadcast journalism ===
==== BBC News ====
BBC News introduced the role of political editor in 1970. In addition to the nationwide political editors, Glenn Campbell has been political editor for BBC Scotland since 2021, Felicity Evans has been political editor for BBC Cymru Wales since 2018 and Nicholas Watt has been political editor for Newsnight since 2016.

Political editor	Tenure	Notes
Hardiman Scott	1970–1975	Then Chief Assistant to the Director-General of the BBC
David Holmes	1975–1980	
John Simpson	1980–1981	BBC World Affairs Editor from 1988 to present
John Cole	1981–1992	Retired from political journalism
Robin Oakley	1992–2000	European political editor of CNN 2000–2008
Andrew Marr	2000–2005	Presented The Andrew Marr Show from 2005 to 2021, now at LBC
Nick Robinson	2005–2015	Political editor of ITV News 2002–2005, now a Today programme presenter
Laura Kuenssberg	2015–2022	Presenting Sunday with Laura Kuenssberg since 2022
Chris Mason	2022–present	

==== ITV News ====
ITN produces news programmes for ITV, Channel 4 and Channel 5. The ITN brand was used on ITV until 1999, when it was rebranded as ITV News.

Political editor	Tenure	Notes
Julian Haviland	1975–1981	Subsequently political editor of The Times newspaper
Glyn Mathias	1981–1986	Subsequently political editor of BBC Wales and Electoral Commissioner
Michael Brunson	1986–2000	Retired
John Sergeant	2000–2002	Retired, previously Political Correspondent of BBC News 1981–1992 and Chief Political Correspondent 1992–2000
Nick Robinson	2002–2005	Political editor of BBC News 2005–2015, now a Today programme presenter
Tom Bradby	2005–2015	Now an ITV News at Ten presenter
Robert Peston	2015–present	

Additionally, Colin Mackay has been the political editor for STV News in Scotland since 2019, when he replaced Bernard Ponsonby.

==== Channel 4 News ====
Political editors for Channel 4 News include:

- Elinor Goodman, 1988–2005
- Gary Gibbon, 2005–present (also political correspondent 1994–2005)

==== 5 News ====
ITN produced the 5 News programme for Channel 5 from the channel's launch in 1997 until 2005 and again from 2012, with Sky News providing news coverage in the intervening years. Andy Bell has been the programme's political editor since 1999.

==== Sky News ====
Sky News launched in 1989 with Adam Boulton as political editor. Faisal Islam took over the role in 2014 before moving to the BBC as Economics Editor in 2019. Islam was replaced as Sky's political editor by his former deputy, Beth Rigby.

Political editor	Tenure	Notes
Adam Boulton	1989–2014	
Faisal Islam	2014–2019	
Beth Rigby	2019–present	

=== UTV Northern Ireland ===
==== UTV Live ====
Political Editor	Tenure	Notes
Ken Reid	1993–2021	
Tracey Magee	2021–present	

=== BBC Northern Ireland ===
==== BBC Newsline ====
Political Editor	Tenure	Notes
Mark Devenport	2005–2020	
Enda McClafferty	2020–present	

=== Print journalism ===
==== The Guardian ====
Political editor	Tenure	Notes
Ian Aitken	1975–1990	
Michael White	1990–2006	
Patrick Wintour	2006–2015	
Heather Stewart	2016–2022	
Anushka Asthana	2016–2018	Asthana was political editor in a job-share arrangement with Heather Stewart beginning in early 2016
Pippa Crerar	2022–present	

==== The Sun ====
Political editor	Tenure	Notes
Trevor Kavanagh	1983–2005	
George Pascoe-Watson	2006–2009	
Tom Newton Dunn	2009–2020	
Harry Cole	2020–present	

==== The Sunday Times ====
Political editor	Tenure	Notes
Isabel Oakeshott	2010–2014	
Tim Shipman	2014–2021	
Caroline Wheeler	2021–2026	

== Rest of the world ==
=== Australia ===
==== ABC News ====
Political editor	Tenure	Notes
Chris Uhlmann	2015–2017	Position created; Political Editor for Nine News 2017–2022
Andrew Probyn	2017–present	Previously 7.30 Political Editor

==== 7NEWS ====
Political editor	Tenure	Notes
Mark Riley	2004–present	

==== Nine News ====
Political editor	Tenure	Notes
Laurie Oakes	1984–2017	
Chris Uhlmann	2017–2022	
Charles Croucher	2022–present	

==== The Australian ====
Political editor	Tenure	Notes
Dennis Shanahan	1989–2021	
Simon Benson	2021–present	

=== New Zealand ===
- Patrick Gower (Newshub) - 2012–2018

=== United States ===
- Brooke Brower (CNN) - 2017–present
- Patrick Healy (The New York Times) - 2018–present
- Chris Stirewalt (Fox News) - 2010–present
- Peter Wallsten (Washington Post) - 2013–present
