= UTV Live =

Northern Ireland television news programme

- Also known as: Good Morning Northern Ireland; UTV News
- Genre: National and regional news
- Presented by: Paul Clark; Rose Neill
- Original language: English

Production
- Production locations: Belfast, Northern Ireland
- Editor: Chris Hagan
- Camera setup: Multi-camera
- Running time: 30 minutes (18:00 broadcast)
- Production company: UTV

Original release
- Network: UTV (ITV1)
- Release: 4 January 1993 – present

Related
- ITV News; ITV Weather; View From Stormont; Roundabout; UTV Reports; Good Evening Ulster; Six Tonight

UTV Live is a Northern Irish television news service broadcast and produced by UTV.

== Overview ==
The main edition of UTV Live airs from 18:00 to 18:30 every weeknight, covering the day's news, current affairs and sport from across Northern Ireland.

The 18:00 programme (known on air as UTV Live at Six) is broadcast from UTV's headquarters in City Quays 2, Belfast. UTV also has studio facilities at Parliament Buildings, Stormont and news bureaux in Derry and Dublin with an intention to open a further bureau in Omagh. The station also makes use of video journalists based in Coleraine, Enniskillen and Newry.

== History ==
UTV Live was introduced in January 1993 as a new name for Ulster Television's existing news programmes; Six Tonight, the station's half-hour evening news magazine, and Ulster Newstime for shorter bulletins.

Following the introduction of the ITV Evening News in March 1999, the programme was brought forward by half an hour to start at 17:30. The first half-hour saw feature reports, light-hearted stories and the weather forecast branded as part of a separate programme, UTV Life, which ran before the main evening news, started at 18:00 and kept the UTV Live name. UTV Live and UTV Life were merged into one hour-long programme, running from 17:30, in 2002 and were split into separate programmes again on 3 September 2007, with the original titles in use from 1999 to 2001.

Mid-morning weekday and lunchtime weekend UTV Live bulletins were axed in February 2009 when the station was permitted to reduce their weekly news output from five hours and twenty minutes to four hours by regulator Ofcom following a lengthy review of the viability of PSB content across the whole UK. A separate sports bulletin, Sport on Sunday, was broadcast following the Sunday evening bulletin from September 1999 to early 2007. This bulletin was separate from the Sunday evening news as it was sponsored by the Daily Mirror.

Between February 2007 and April 2009, only the main weekday evening programme was branded as UTV Live, while all other bulletins were branded as UTV News.

UTV Live broadcast its final edition from Havelock House on 29 June 2018 and began broadcasting from UTV's new headquarters at City Quays on 2 July 2018.

=== UTV Live Tonight ===
On 27 April 2009, UTV launched a 30-minute late evening news and current affairs programme, UTV Live Tonight, which aired after News at Ten on Monday – Thursday nights and incorporated the station's late news bulletin alongside extended political and business coverage.

On 10 August 2016, it was announced that UTV were axing the programme at the end of September 2016 and replacing it with a ten-minute late news bulletin, airing each weekday after News at Ten.

The final edition of UTV Live Tonight aired on 29 September 2016. The station introduced a weekly hour-long Monday night current affairs programme called View from Stormont in October 2016.

== UTV Life ==
UTV Life, a separate live magazine programme concentrating on features and light-hearted stories, was broadcast at 17:30 on weekdays. This programme had its own editor and presenting/reporting team.

UTV Life originally began on 8 March 1999 as a stand-alone programme with features reports, light-hearted stories and an extended weather forecast. The programme ran from 17:30, preceding UTV Live at Six until the two programmes were integrated into an hour-long UTV Live programme in April 2002.

The UTV Life branding for the features section of UTV Live returned to on-air use in September 2007. The features element became a separate programme to accommodate a sponsorship deal. The relaunch of UTV Life saw the programme gain a different theme tune, opening title sequence and graphic design, with a similar presenting, reporting and editorial team as the former features segment of UTV Live.

As part of cost-cutting measures and a reduction in regional programming at the station, UTV Life was axed shortly after the broadcasting regulator OFCOM gave UTV the go ahead to reduce its non-news output, with the final programme airing on 6 February 2009.

The series returned in January 2016 in a weekly 30-minute timeslot on Friday nights, following the late UTV Live bulletin and presented by Pamela Ballantine. The programme returned to a weekly primetime slot at 20:00 in September 2016. Following a new schedule on ITV1/UTV from 2022, UTV Live now airs on Fridays at 19:00 - following the ITV Evening News.

== Notable current on air team ==
=== News ===
News
Person	Position
Paul Clark	Main news anchors
Rose Neill	Main news anchors
Paul Reilly	Main news anchors
Sarah Clarke	Main news anchors
Jordan Moates	Relief news anchors
Katie Andrews	Relief news anchors
Eden Wilson	Relief news anchors
Sara O'Kane	Relief news anchors

=== Reporters ===
Reporters
Person	Position
Tracey Magee	Political Editor
Vicki Hawthorne	Political Correspondent
Jordan Moates	Economics Correspondent
Deborah McAleese	Health Reporter
Gareth Wilkinson	North West Correspondent
Sharon O'Neill	Correspondent
Stewart Robson	News Reporters
Sarah Mc Carron	News Reporters
Marc Mallett	News Reporters
Eden Wilson	News Reporters
Nathan Hanna	News Reporters
Barbara McCann	News Reporters
Jordan Moates	News Reporters
Tori Watson	News Reporters
Jordan Moore	News Reporters
Sara O'Kane	News Reporters

=== Sport ===
Sport
Person	Position
Ruth Gorman	Main Presenter & Sports Correspondent
Daniel Duffy	Relief Sport Presenters
Emma Patterson	Relief Sport Presenters

=== Weather ===
Weather
Person	Position
Louise Small	Main Weather Presenter
Aisling Creevey	Relief Weather Presenter
Rita Fitzgerald	Relief Weather Presenter

== Former notable on air team ==
- Lynda Bryans – presenter (1996–2010)
- Jamie Delargy (Business Editor)
- Jane Loughrey (Correspondent)
- Frank Mitchell (Weather presenter)
- Mike Nesbitt – presenter (1993–2006); former Leader of the Ulster Unionist Party
- Gillian Porter (Newsreader)
- Ken Reid (Political Editor)
- Kate Smith – presenter (1993–2006); now a member of the Northern Ireland Screen board

In October 2008, UTV announced its intention to cut 13 jobs in the news department due to corporate restructuring. The station declared it was offering staff a voluntary redundancy package. Staff who were reported to have accepted the redundancy package were:

- Ivan Little – reporter (1980–2009); now freelancer
- Claire McCollum – presenter/reporter (2000–09)
- Jeanie Johnston – Features Editor (2000–09); Reporter (1978–2009)
- Fearghal McKinney – presenter/reporter (1994–2009)
- Adrian Logan – sports editor; sports presenter/reporter (1985–2009)

Preceded by Spotlight: Loyalists at War	RTS: Television Journalism; Nations and Regions Current Affairs (Insight: When Hospitals Kill); (Insight: Under the Law); 2005, 2006	Succeeded by Inside Out East: Stammer
Preceded by Spotlight: The Iris Robinson Investigation	RTS: Television Journalism; Nations and Regions Current Affairs and News Event (Insight: The Resurrection of Brendan Smyth); 2012	Succeeded by Incumbent
