= Tracey Magee =

Northern Irish broadcaster and journalist currently UTV Political Editor

- Born: 27 March 1969 (age 56); Belfast, Northern Ireland
- Occupation: Journalist
- Known for: UTV
- Notable work: Deputy Political Editor, UTV (2016-2021)
- Title: Political Editor, UTV Live (2021-present)

Tracey Magee (born March 1969 in Belfast, Northern Ireland) is a Northern Irish broadcaster and journalist. She was Deputy Political Editor at UTV from 2016 to 2021. She succeeded Ken Reid as Political Editor in 2021.

== Broadcasting career ==
Magee joined UTV in April 1997. She became Deputy Political Editor in 2016. In 2021 she succeeded Ken Reid as Political Editor. As well as reporting, she has also presented news bulletins and feature programmes on UTV.

== Personal life ==
Magee and her partner opened a bistro in Belfast in 2007.
