= Loughrey =

Loughrey is a surname. Notable people with the surname include:

- Andrew Loughrey (1844–1913), New Zealand politician
- Cale Loughrey (born 2001), Canadian soccer player
- James Loughrey (born 1986), Irish Gaelic footballer
- Jane Loughrey, Northern Irish journalist
- Joachim Loughrey (born 1947), Irish politician
- Johnny Loughrey (1945–2005), Northern Irish singer and songwriter
- Pat Loughrey (born 1955), Irish media executive
- Stuart Loughrey (born 1991), Irish field hockey player
