= Phoenix Living Poets =

Poetry series

The Phoenix Living Poets was a series of slim books of poetry published from 1960 until 1983 by Chatto and Windus Ltd. The poets included in the series offer a cross-section of poets of the era, including some notable writers. Generally those writing were not producing the most experimental work of the era but, taken as a whole, the series covers a significant range of voices and styles.

The series had its origins in the Hogarth Press, which was founded in 1917 by Leonard and Virginia Woolf. In 1946, Hogarth came under the control of Chatto and Windus, and in 1969 Chatto and Windus joined Jonathan Cape, becoming part of Random House in 1987. One of the earliest books in the series was a second impression of Laurie Lee's "The Sun my Monument" originally published by the Hogarth Press in 1944 in its "New Hogarth Library" series and some other poets are represented in both series. The Phoenix Living Poets series was started by Chatto & Windus with some continuity of poets from the earlier series and this imprint was maintained throughout the years of publication. Typically the title pages of the Phoenix Living Poets series show both 'Chatto and Windus' and 'The Hogarth Press' together.

The series was edited but the editors are not named on the individual volumes. D J Enright was the editor in the early 1980s (at least), according to J. H. Williams in "The Salt." Some of the covers were designed by Enid Marx, known for her patterned textile and book jacket designs. A typical volume has from 48 to 72 pages.

== Authors ==
- James Aitchison
- Alexander Baird
- Alan Bold
- R H Bowden
- Frederick Broadie
- Michael Burn
- Philip Callow
- Hayden Carruth
- Robert Conquest
- John Cotton
- Jennifer Couroucli
- Patric Dickinson
- Tom Earley
- D J Enright
- Gloria Evans Davies
- Irene Fekete
- John Fuller
- David Gill
- Peter Gruffydd
- D J Hall
- J C Hall
- Molly Holden
- John Horder
- Peter Howe
- P J Kavanagh
- Richard Kell
- Laurie Lee
- Laurence Lerner
- Christopher Levenson
- Edward Lowbury
- Norman MacCaig
- George Mackay Brown
- Roy McFadden
- Diana McLoghlen
- James Merrill
- Ruth Miller
- Leslie Norris
- Richard Outram
- Robert Pack
- Rodney Pybus
- Arnold Rattenbury
- Adrienne Rich
- Hardiman Scott
- Anne Sexton
- Jon Silkin
- John Smith
- Jon Stallworthy
- Gillian Stoneham
- Edward Storey
- David Sutton
- Terence Tiller
- Sydney Tremayne
- Jon Manchip White
- John Hartley Williams
- Lotte Zurndorfer
