= List of districts in Northern Ireland by national identity =

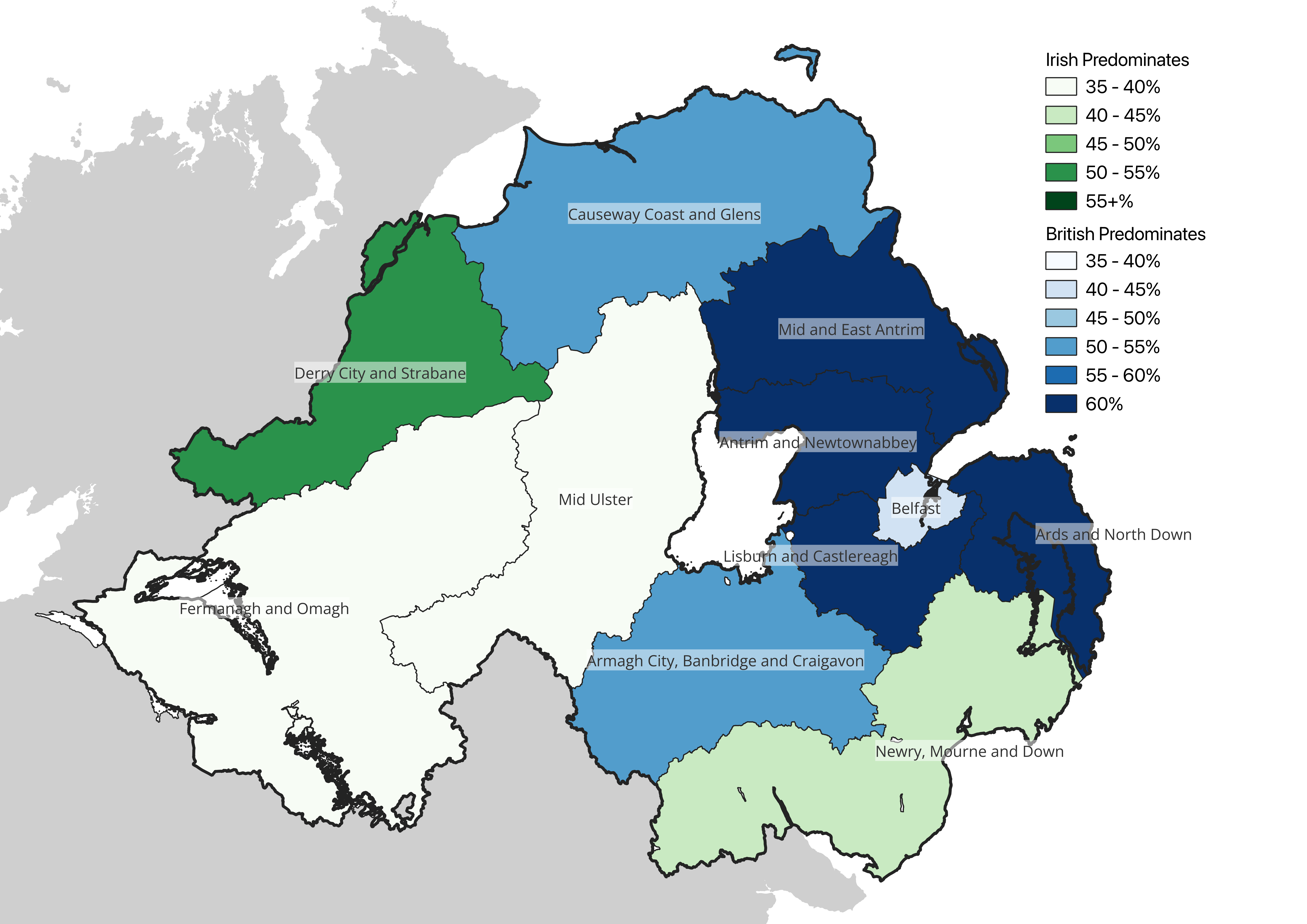
Map of new districts of Northern Ireland colour coded to show the predominant national identity at the time of the 2011 census. Stronger green indicates a higher proportion of people describing themselves as Irish. Stronger blue indicates a higher proportion of people describing themselves as British.

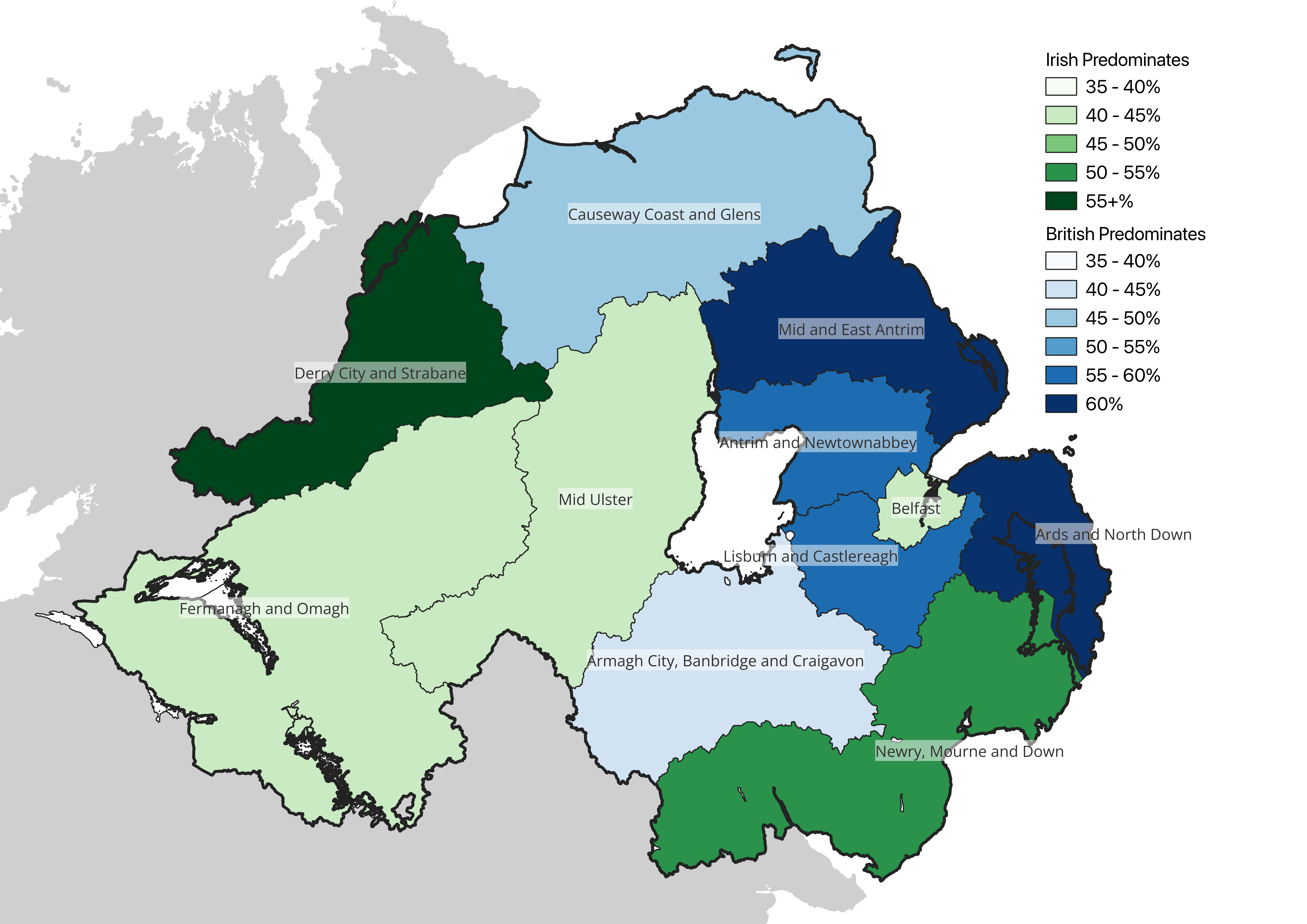
Map of new districts of Northern Ireland colour coded to show the predominant national identity at the time of the 2021 census. Stronger green indicates a higher proportion of people describing themselves as Irish. Stronger blue indicates a higher proportion of people describing themselves as British.

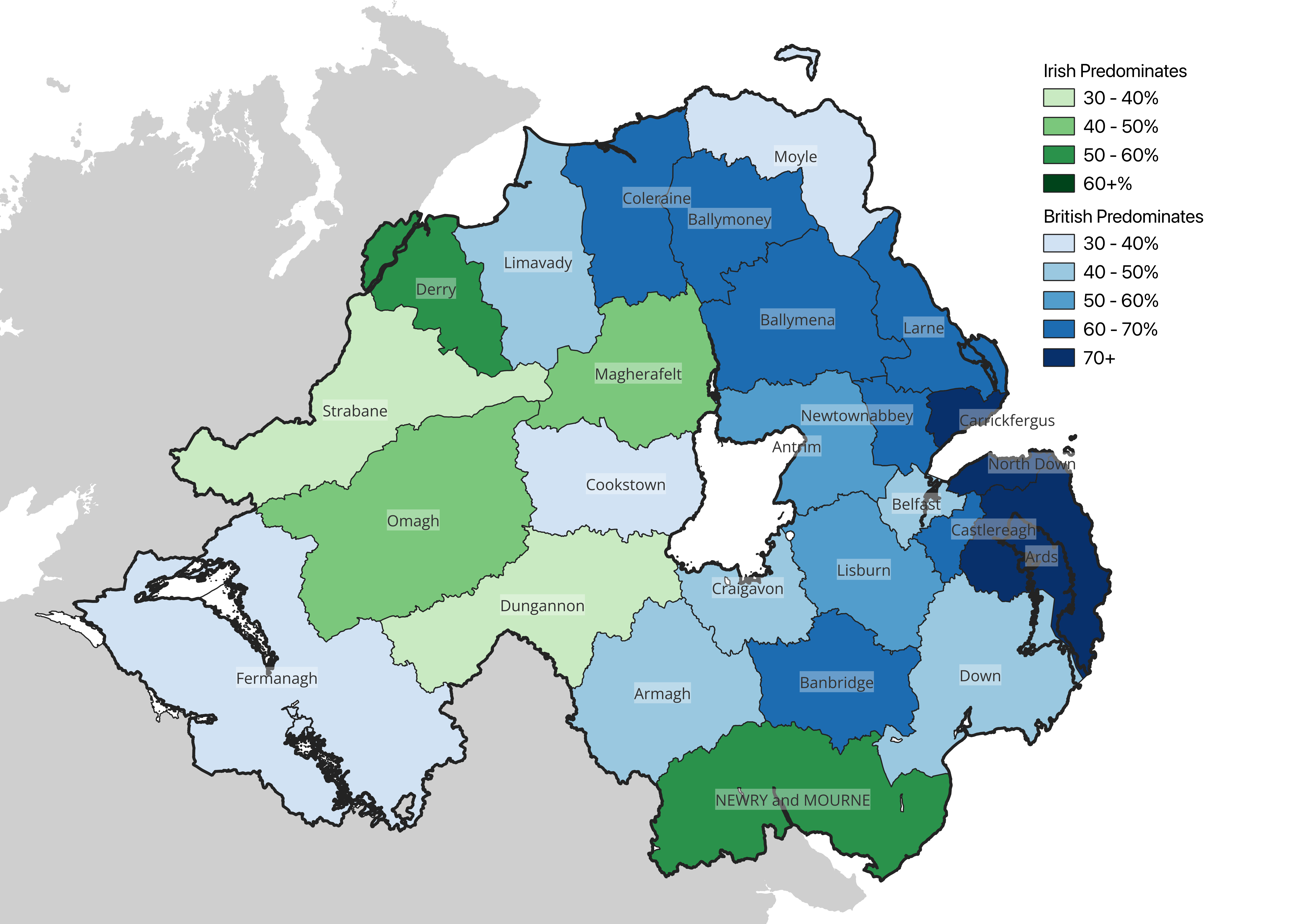
Map of districts of Northern Ireland colour coded to show the predominant national identity in the 2011 census. Stronger green indicates a higher proportion of people describing themselves as Irish. Stronger blue indicates a higher proportion of people describing themselves as British. Percentages show the difference between the proportion of people describing themselves as Irish and the proportion of people describing themselves as British.

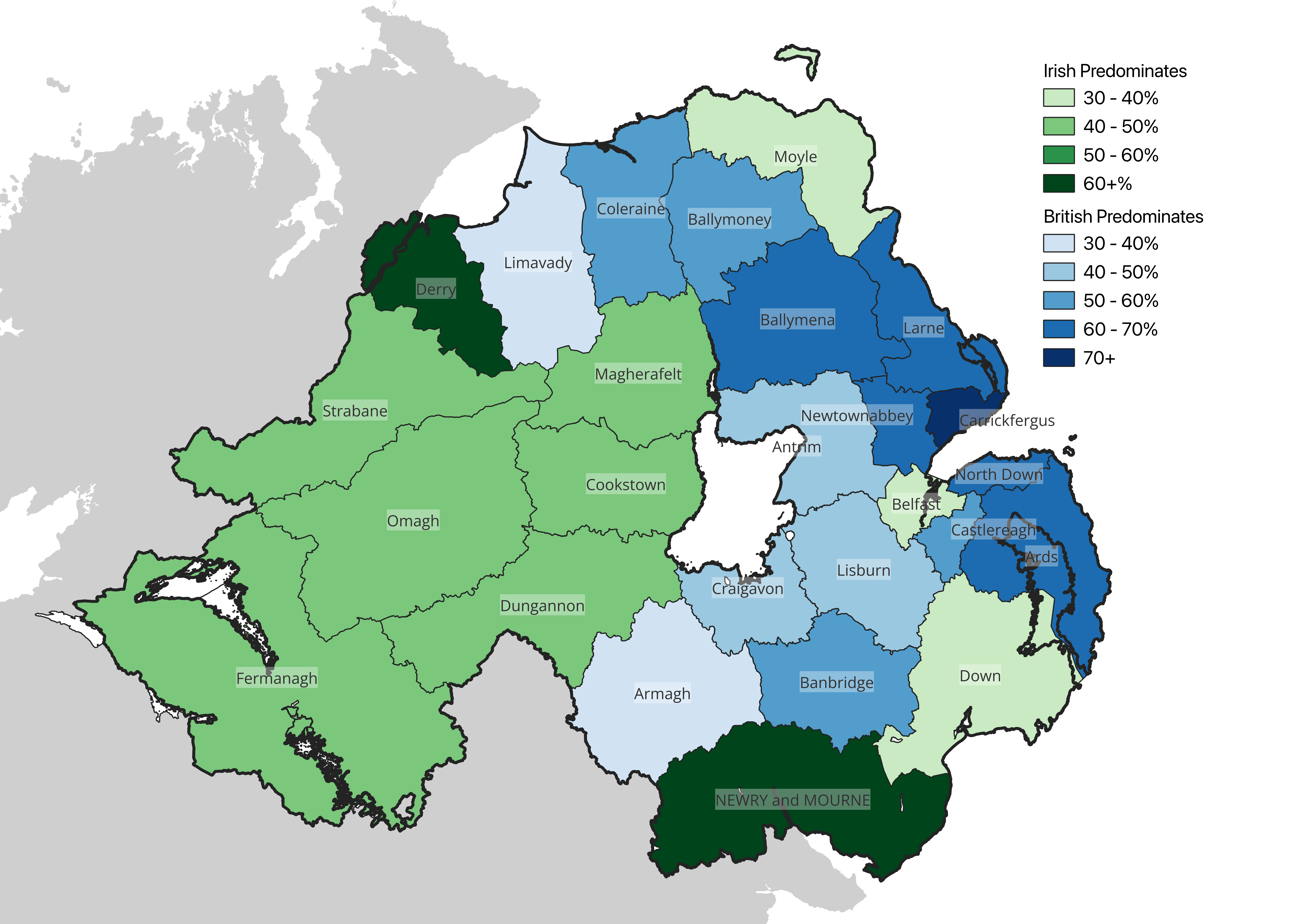
Map of districts of Northern Ireland colour coded to show the predominant national identity in the 2021 census. Stronger green indicates a higher proportion of people describing themselves as Irish. Stronger blue indicates a higher proportion of people describing themselves as British. Percentages show the difference between the proportion of people describing themselves as Irish and the proportion of people describing themselves as British.

This is a list of local government districts in Northern Ireland by national identity.

In 2011 the decennial UK Census asked respondents for the first time "How would you describe your national identity?” In Northern Ireland respondents were given a list of options (including British, Irish, and Northern Irish) from which they could choose as many as they wanted. The question was repeated in the 2021 census.

In 2011 British identity outnumbered Irish identity in twenty of the 26 old districts. In 2021 in five of these districts (Belfast, Moyle, Down, Fermanagh, and Cookstown) Irish identity now outnumbers British identity. In two more districts, Armagh and Limavady, British identity outnumbers Irish by a small amount, 2.9% and 0.1% respectively, down from 12% and 10.2% respectively.

Similarly, in the new districts, British identity outnumbered Irish identity in seven of the 11 districts. In 2021 Irish identity outnumbers British identity in Belfast, so British now outnumbers Irish in six of the 11 districts.

British identity was in a majority in ten districts (down from 11 in 2011) whereas in 2021 Irish national identity was numerically in a majority in two districts, Derry and Newry, where 61.3% and 60.5% respectively consider themselves as having an Irish national identity. This was an increase of 6.3% and 7.5% respectively over the number from 2011.

British identity was a majority in six of the new districts in 2011, and down to five in 2021. Irish was in the majority in only Derry and Strabane in 2011, and was in the majority Derry and Strabane and Newry, Mourne and Down in 2021.

== 2021 Census ==
=== National Identity by 2014 Local Government District ===
District	British	Irish	Northern Irish	Change in British from 2011	Change in Irish from 2011	Change in Northern Irish from 2011	Relative Change in Irish compared to British
Antrim and Newtownabbey	55.5	20.8	36.0	-6.7	4.8	5.1	11.5
Ards and North Down	67.4	10.7	40.3	-5.0	2.4	7.9	7.4
Armagh, Banbridge and Craigavon	44.2	29.8	30.4	-6.3	4.6	1.5	10.9
Belfast	36.8	40.3	27.6	-6.5	5.2	0.7	11.6
Causeway Coast and Glens	50.0	25.4	35.2	-4.3	4.0	3.9	8.3
Derry and Strabane	22.5	57.5	24.9	-3.7	6.7	-1.6	10.5
Fermanagh and Omagh	29.0	44.7	29.9	-4.3	6.4	-1.1	10.7
Lisburn and Castlereagh	57.0	20.6	36.6	-8.4	5.8	6.1	14.2
Mid and East Antrim	65.3	11.3	35.9	-6.1	2.1	6.5	8.2
Mid Ulster	28.2	44.2	26.3	-4.3	5.4	-3.0	9.6
Newry City, Mourne and Down District	23.5	51.9	28.8	-5.0	7.6	-1.6	12.6

=== National Identity by 1993 Local Government District ===
The Local Government Districts listed below are no longer the official local administrative districts. However the 2021 census provides data relating to the older districts so they can be compared.

District	British	Irish	Northern Irish	Change in British since 2011	Change in Irish since 2011	Change in Northern Irish since 2011	Relative Change in Irish compared to British
Antrim	48.4%	25.4%	34.4%	-6.8%	5.3%	4.0%	12.1%
Ards	69.3%	9.3%	39.5%	-4.3%	1.8%	7.6%	6.1%
Armagh	40.0%	37.1%	27.3%	-4.4%	4.7%	0.2%	9.1%
Ballymena	61.8%	13.4%	32.9%	-7.2%	2.3%	5.0%	9.5%
Ballymoney	56.6%	19.9%	35.5%	-4.0%	3.5%	4.6%	7.5%
Banbridge	53.5%	21.9%	37.2%	-7.6%	5.7%	5.4%	13.3%
Belfast	37.0%	39.4%	27.5%	-6.2%	4.6%	0.7%	10.8%
Carrickfergus	71.7%	6.9%	38.7%	-4.8%	1.6%	8.4%	6.4%
Castlereagh	57.6%	20.3%	37.7%	-8.6%	5.6%	6.4%	14.2%
Coleraine	57.8%	17.3%	36.7%	-4.6%	2.8%	5.1%	7.4%
Cookstown	32.0%	40.6%	30.0%	-5.3%	7.1%	-2.1%	12.4%
Craigavon	41.7%	29.6%	29.1%	-6.6%	4.0%	0.4%	10.6%
Derry	20.1%	61.3%	23.2%	-3.6%	6.3%	-1.4%	9.9%
Down	33.2%	39.6%	36.1%	-7.0%	7.4%	2.0%	14.4%
Dungannon and South Tyrone	26.5%	42.4%	23.9%	-4.4%	3.6%	-3.2%	8.0%
Fermanagh	32.9%	41.9%	29.1%	-4.3%	5.8%	-0.4%	10.1%
Larne	64.8%	12.4%	38.7%	-5.0%	2.3%	7.3%	7.4%
Limavady	37.3%	37.2%	34.1%	-4.9%	5.2%	3.4%	10.1%
Lisburn	48.3%	30.6%	32.6%	-7.3%	5.9%	3.9%	13.2%
Magherafelt	27.8%	49.3%	26.5%	-3.6%	6.6%	-3.3%	10.2%
Moyle	36.4%	39.6%	31.8%	-2.2%	5.5%	-0.3%	7.8%
Newry And Mourne	16.8%	60.5%	23.6%	-3.4%	7.5%	-4.0%	10.9%
Newtownabbey	60.1%	17.7%	37.0%	-6.4%	4.3%	5.8%	10.8%
North Down	65.5%	12.1%	41.1%	-5.6%	3.0%	8.1%	8.6%
Omagh	24.3%	48.0%	30.8%	-4.3%	7.1%	-1.9%	11.4%
Strabane	29.0%	47.3%	29.3%	-4.0%	8.1%	-2.5%	12.1%

=== National Identity by Religion by District ===
National identity by religion or religion brought up in for each district
District	Catholic			Protestant and other Christian			Other Religion or None		
District	British	Irish	Northern Irish	British	Irish	Northern Irish	British	Irish	Northern Irish
Antrim	16.2	53.4	31.6	76.6	4.3	36.0	52.8	9.6	37.4
Ards	26.1	39.7	39.9	78.7	4.3	38.1	62.5	7.4	45.2
Armagh	4.6	70.3	22.9	78.7	4.2	31.9	39.5	13.7	28.9
Ballymena	16.9	45.2	32.5	79.1	2.9	32.5	54.7	7.1	36.8
Ballymoney	12.7	55.2	35.3	79.2	3.1	35.2	60.8	7.4	38.4
Banbridge	14.5	53.8	35.8	77.3	4.6	37.1	51.2	11.8	43.0
Belfast	8.4	72.0	20.7	73.6	6.8	35.7	39.0	14.9	29.2
Carrickfergus	32.0	31.2	41.0	79.3	3.5	37.0	62.2	7.2	44.5
Castlereagh	14.1	60.4	31.5	76.9	5.2	38.9	55.5	12.4	42.8
Coleraine	19.3	46.2	34.4	76.8	5.1	36.4	52.5	10.7	43.1
Cookstown	5.4	63.8	29.0	78.5	3.6	31.9	34.0	14.9	28.3
Craigavon	8.4	57.5	25.1	78.3	4.0	33.4	40.7	10.5	29.5
Derry	5.1	77.8	20.0	72.2	7.7	34.0	34.9	29.1	29.2
Down	13.4	57.5	34.9	72.3	7.3	37.5	43.2	19.1	40.2
Dungannon	4.1	62.1	20.6	76.6	4.0	31.7	26.6	12.5	22.5
Fermanagh	7.9	65.4	27.2	73.3	6.4	32.5	39.5	18.8	28.4
Larne	29.2	39.5	39.8	79.0	3.4	37.4	59.0	7.6	43.3
Limavady	12.8	58.7	33.5	78.1	3.8	33.8	46.5	14.2	43.1
Lisburn	11.2	68.3	23.9	76.3	5.7	38.0	53.3	11.7	38.4
Magherafelt	4.7	71.1	24.8	80.2	3.5	29.9	41.3	14.6	31.0
Moyle	10.3	64.2	29.7	75.8	4.7	34.0	47.8	15.8	38.2
Newry And Mourne	4.4	73.8	21.7	72.6	6.4	32.4	29.0	26.0	24.4
Newtownabbey	16.2	56.5	30.9	78.7	3.9	37.9	57.3	9.4	43.6
North Down	28.7	39.9	38.8	75.9	6.5	40.4	58.3	10.1	45.2
Omagh	5.7	65.2	29.3	75.1	4.5	35.2	35.4	16.6	31.2
Strabane	5.5	68.8	27.8	77.3	4.4	32.1	37.7	25.2	34.2

=== Main Changes 2011 to 2021 ===
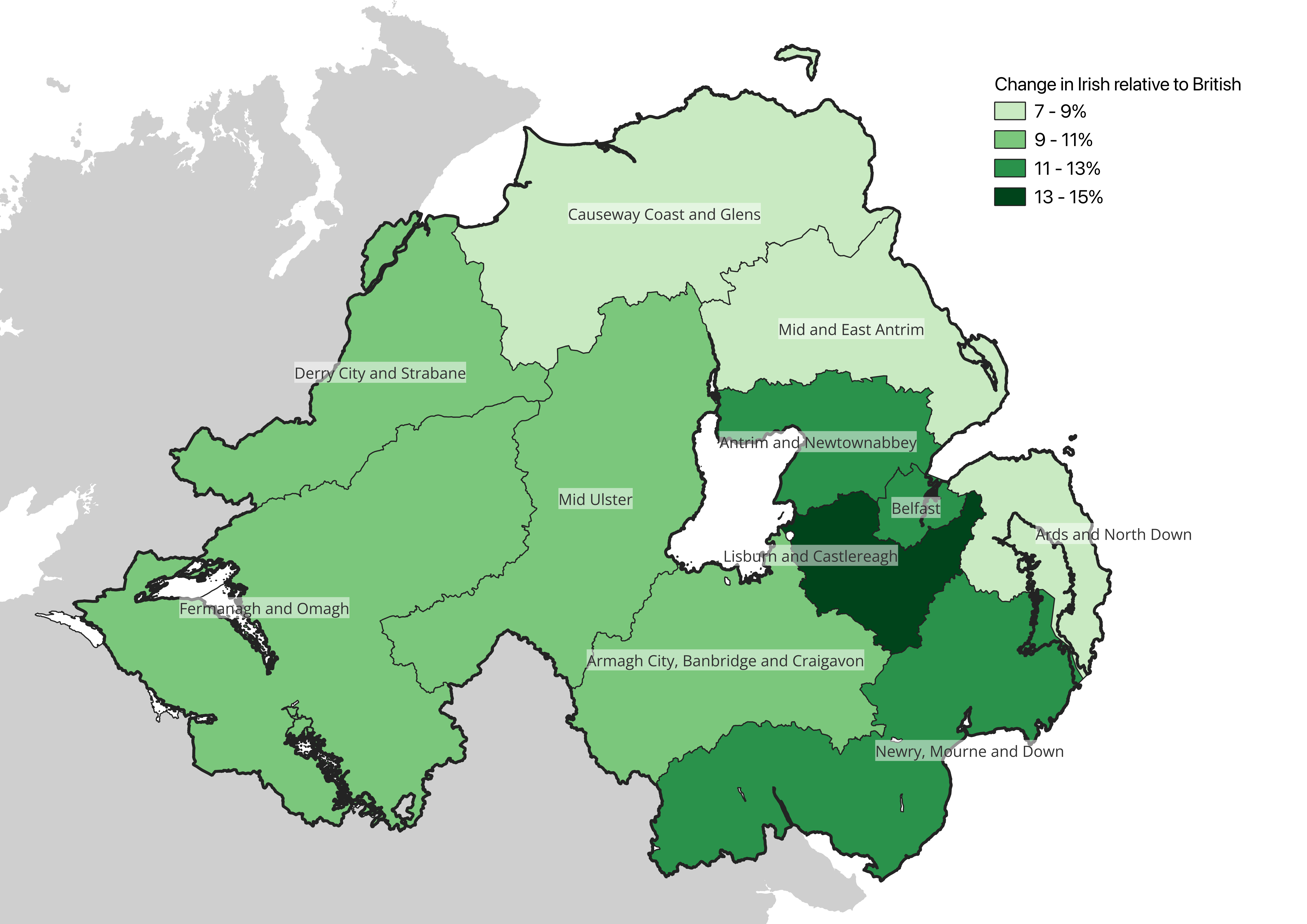
Relative change in Irish compared to British in 2014 districts between the 2011 and 2021 censuses

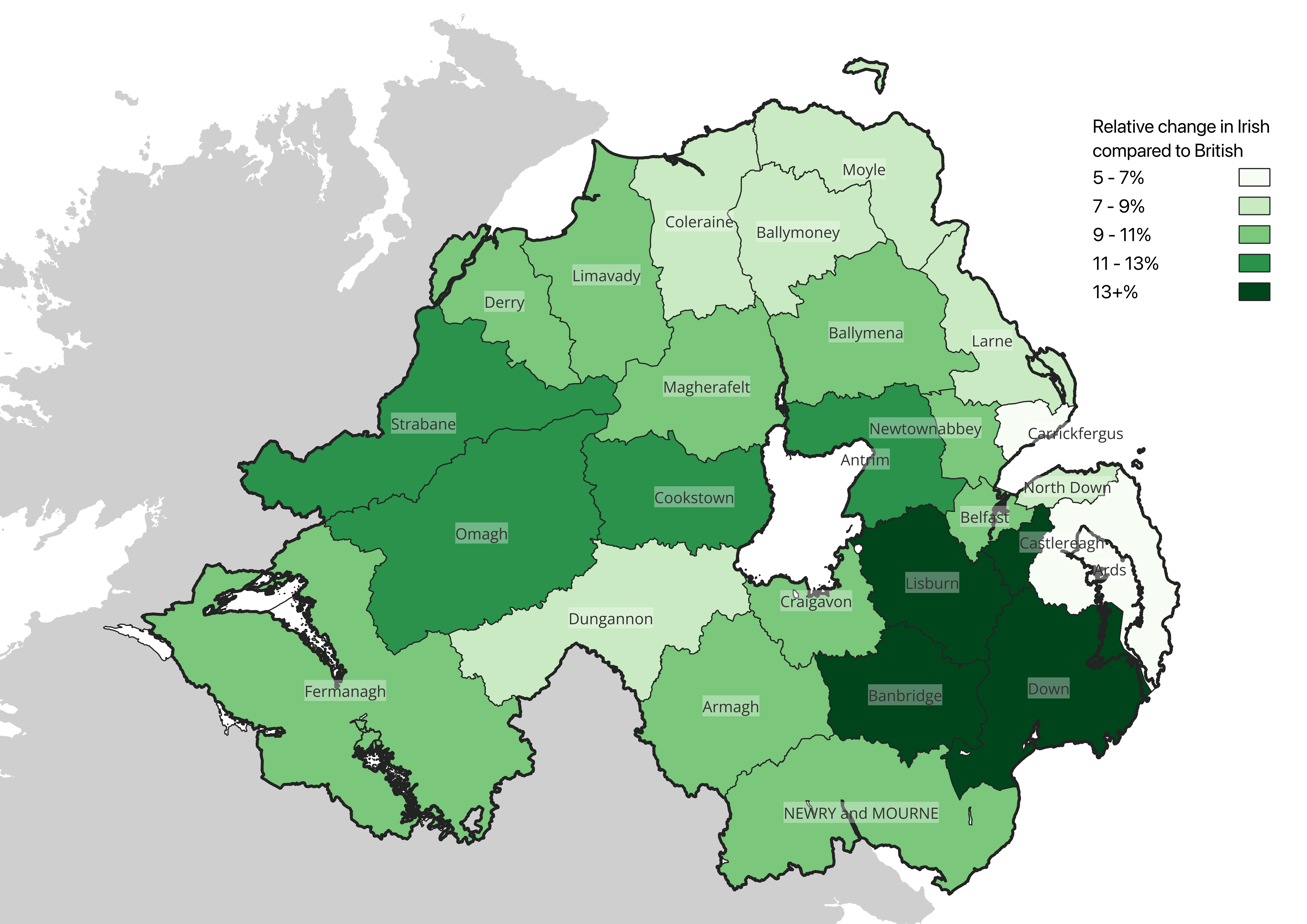
Relative change in Irish compared to British in 1993 districts between the 2011 and 2021 censuses

The main changes between the 2011 and 2021 censuses can be summarized as:

- British outnumbered Irish in 20 out of the 26 old districts in 2011. In 2021 British outnumbered Irish in 15 old districts. In two of the old districts, the difference was less than 3%: Armagh 2.9% and Limavady 0.1%. Belfast switched from predominantly British to predominantly Irish
- British outnumbered Irish in seven of the 11 new districts in 2011, and six of the new districts in 2021.
- Every district, old and new, had a drop in those identifying as British
- Every district, old and new had an increase in those identifying as Irish
- Relative change from British to Irish was between 6.1% in Ards, and 14.4% in Down in the old districts
- Relative change from British to Irish was between 7.4% in Ards and North Down and 14.2% in Lisburn and Castlereagh in the new districts.
- The largest increases in Irish relative to British, of over 13%, was concentrated in the districts close to and to the south of Belfast
- In the 2011 old districts more Catholics identified as British than Irish in Ards, North Down, Larne, and Carrickfergus. In 2021, only in the Carrickfergus district were slightly more Catholics identifying as British than Irish (32% vs 31.2%)

== 2011 Census ==
Irish national identity was numerically in a majority in two districts, Derry and Newry, where 55.03% and 52.09% respectively consider themselves as having an Irish national identity. Whilst 45.14% of the population of Northern Ireland said that they were either Catholic or that they had been raised Catholic, only 28.35% described their nationality as Irish. In the Larne Borough Council area the percentage of Catholics was 24.87% and the figure for Irish nationality was 10.1%, meaning that no more (and almost certainly less) than 32.40% of Catholics described themselves as having an Irish nationality.

British nationality was numerically in a majority in eleven districts. The fact that the overall number of people who described their nationality as British (48.41%) is very similar to the proportion who said that they were from a Protestant community background (48.36%) is not tantamount to proving that all Protestants see themselves primarily as British. In nine of Northern Ireland's 26 council areas, British nationality was a higher proportion than the number of Protestants. For example, in the Down District Council the figure for British nationality (40.21%) is 123.38% of the figure for Protestants (32.08%), meaning that, even if every single Protestant were to have chosen a British nationality, a substantial amount of those choosing a British nationality were evidently not Protestant.

Northern Irish nationality was geographically evenly spread throughout the region. There was no strong correlation between Northern Irish nationality at local government level and religion or community background. For instance the two highest areas of Northern Irish national identity were Down (34.12%) and North Down (32.95%); the former being mostly Catholic (62.51%) and the latter being mostly Protestant (73.23%).

There was a British national identity majority or plurality over Irish nationality in 20 of the 26 council areas, and there was an Irish national identity majority or plurality over British national identity in 6 of the 26 council areas.

=== National Identity by District ===
Map of predominant national identity in the 2011 census in Northern Ireland

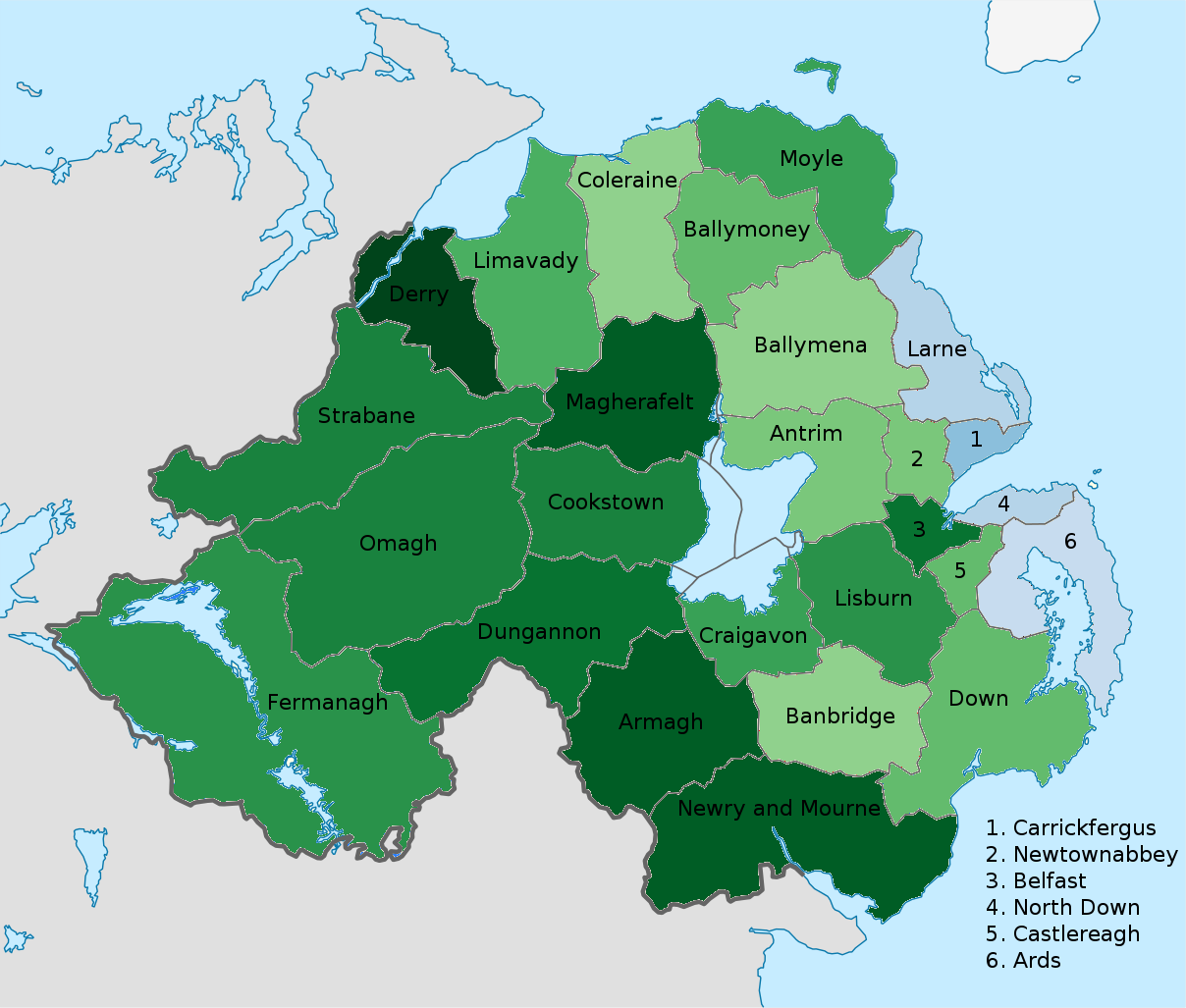
Map of districts of Northern Ireland colour coded to show the predominant national identity amongst Catholics in the 2011 census. Stronger green indicates a higher proportion of Catholics describing themselves as Irish. Blue indicates more Catholics describing themselves as British than as Irish. Percentages show the difference between the proportion of Catholics describing themselves as Irish and the proportion of Catholics describing themselves as British.

District	British	Irish	Northern Irish	English, Scottish or Welsh	All Other
Antrim	55.2%	20.1%	30.4%	2.3%	3.9%
Ards	73.6%	7.5%	31.9%	1.9%	1.5%
Armagh	44.4%	32.4%	27.1%	1.1%	3.9%
Ballymena	69.0%	11.1%	27.9%	1.4%	3.8%
Ballymoney	60.6%	16.4%	30.9%	1.7%	1.7%
Banbridge	61.1%	16.2%	31.8%	1.5%	1.8%
Belfast	43.2%	34.8%	26.8%	1.5%	5.1%
Carrickfergus	76.5%	5.3%	30.3%	2.1%	1.8%
Castlereagh	66.2%	14.7%	31.3%	1.5%	2.6%
Coleraine	62.4%	14.5%	31.6%	2.0%	3.2%
Cookstown	37.3%	33.5%	32.1%	1.2%	3.7%
Craigavon	48.3%	25.6%	28.7%	1.4%	6.4%
Derry	23.7%	55.0%	24.6%	1.4%	2.0%
Down	40.2%	32.2%	34.1%	1.9%	2.0%
Dungannon and South Tyrone	30.9%	38.8%	27.1%	0.9%	9.6%
Fermanagh	37.2%	36.1%	29.5%	1.7%	3.1%
Larne	69.8%	10.1%	31.4%	2.1%	1.2%
Limavady	42.2%	32.0%	30.7%	1.5%	1.4%
Lisburn	55.6%	24.7%	28.7%	2.0%	2.4%
Magherafelt	31.4%	42.7%	29.8%	1.0%	2.8%
Moyle	38.6%	34.1%	32.1%	2.2%	1.4%
Newry and Mourne	20.2%	53.0%	27.6%	1.2%	4.3%
Newtownabbey	66.5%	13.4%	31.2%	1.3%	2.4%
North Down	71.1%	9.1%	33.0%	3.0%	2.4%
Omagh	28.6%	40.9%	32.7%	1.1%	3.4%
Strabane	33.0%	39.2%	31.8%	1.4%	1.3%

National identity by religion or religion brought up in for each district
District	Catholic				Protestant and other Christian				Other Religion or None			
District	British	Irish	Northern Irish	All Other	British	Irish	Northern Irish	All Other	British	Irish	Northern Irish	All Other
Antrim	23.1%	43.7%	34.2%	7.1%	80.6%	3.1%	27.8%	3.3%	60.4%	6.5%	26.8%	19.0%
Ards	34.1%	31.7%	38.2%	6.4%	80.9%	3.7%	30.4%	2.2%	67.7%	6.0%	35.1%	9.1%
Armagh	7.1%	62.5%	28.7%	6.2%	81.6%	3.6%	25.7%	2.3%	49.3%	10.5%	25.1%	25.3%
Ballymena	24.6%	38.9%	34.7%	11.0%	83.6%	2.7%	25.7%	2.5%	62.3%	6.5%	28.4%	14.4%
Ballymoney	19.0%	44.5%	38.8%	4.1%	81.1%	2.9%	27.2%	2.2%	65.1%	8.4%	28.0%	13.3%
Banbridge	22.6%	41.7%	39.4%	4.5%	81.2%	3.8%	27.7%	2.0%	59.1%	8.3%	33.8%	11.5%
Belfast	11.7%	64.3%	25.0%	5.6%	78.3%	5.5%	28.7%	3.6%	47.7%	13.3%	27.5%	26.3%
Carrickfergus	41.1%	24.6%	35.6%	10.7%	82.0%	3.0%	29.2%	2.4%	68.3%	5.3%	33.7%	8.5%
Castlereagh	22.1%	50.0%	34.5%	6.3%	81.3%	3.9%	29.9%	2.3%	61.9%	8.9%	33.7%	11.8%
Coleraine	25.0%	39.2%	36.5%	8.4%	79.1%	4.3%	29.3%	2.6%	56.5%	10.3%	33.4%	16.8%
Cookstown	8.1%	53.8%	37.7%	5.2%	82.5%	3.6%	24.0%	2.1%	44.2%	9.1%	24.4%	31.5%
Craigavon	12.2%	51.2%	31.5%	10.6%	82.5%	3.2%	26.3%	2.7%	49.9%	9.1%	26.7%	26.4%
Derry	7.3%	70.5%	24.3%	2.5%	76.7%	7.2%	25.9%	3.5%	39.4%	24.7%	21.9%	26.2%
Down	20.1%	47.4%	37.1%	2.9%	77.4%	5.6%	28.7%	3.6%	52.1%	14.4%	32.1%	16.7%
Dungannon and South Tyrone	5.7%	57.6%	28.6%	13.0%	79.6%	4.5%	24.5%	3.0%	33.3%	12.0%	22.8%	42.1%
Fermanagh	11.4%	56.2%	32.4%	4.8%	77.1%	6.2%	25.5%	3.0%	43.4%	16.8%	24.0%	28.1%
Larne	38.8%	30.6%	37.7%	3.0%	81.7%	3.0%	28.6%	2.5%	64.1%	6.5%	35.4%	12.1%
Limavady	18.1%	50.5%	34.4%	2.5%	79.8%	4.1%	24.9%	2.5%	51.4%	10.9%	28.8%	18.7%
Lisburn	16.5%	58.6%	27.8%	4.3%	80.2%	4.7%	29.0%	3.2%	62.2%	8.8%	30.3%	13.9%
Magherafelt	6.5%	62.1%	33.0%	3.8%	82.4%	4.2%	23.1%	2.3%	46.9%	13.4%	30.2%	22.1%
Moyle	14.6%	53.1%	35.3%	2.8%	76.3%	5.0%	27.8%	3.3%	49.4%	17.8%	23.8%	19.8%
Newry and Mourne	7.1%	64.7%	28.0%	5.0%	76.3%	5.8%	26.8%	3.8%	34.6%	22.8%	22.1%	28.9%
Newtownabbey	24.7%	46.1%	34.1%	5.7%	80.9%	3.4%	30.1%	1.7%	63.1%	7.3%	32.1%	12.3%
North Down	37.1%	31.5%	36.1%	9.7%	78.8%	5.2%	31.9%	3.4%	63.7%	7.9%	35.7%	11.6%
Omagh	8.7%	55.7%	36.0%	4.4%	78.5%	4.9%	25.0%	2.5%	40.6%	15.9%	23.7%	28.9%
Strabane	8.9%	57.4%	35.4%	2.6%	79.2%	4.7%	25.2%	1.9%	40.9%	21.1%	25.5%	26.4%

=== New districts, 2015 ===
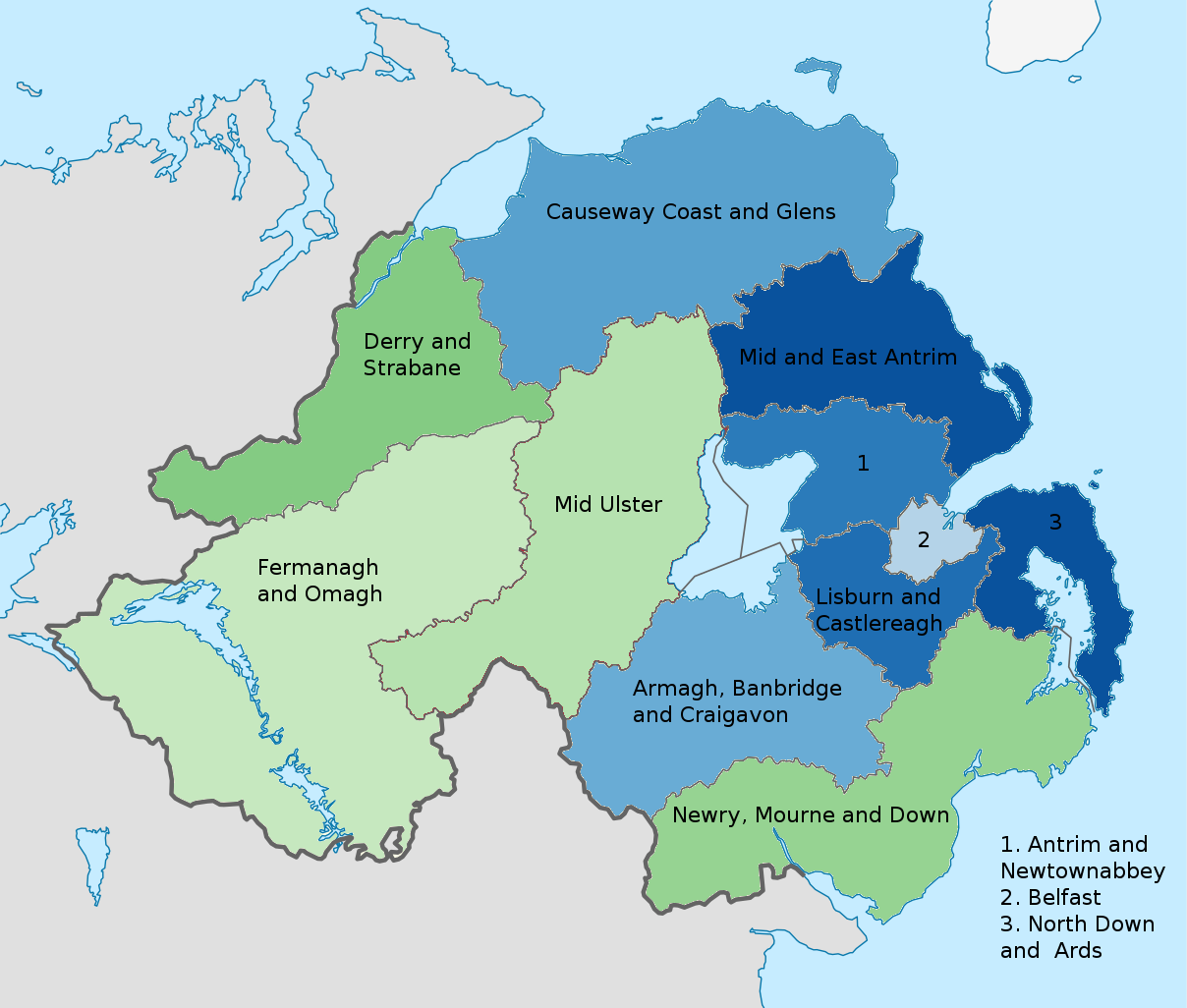
Map of new districts of Northern Ireland colour coded to show the predominant national identity at the time of the 2011 census. Stronger green indicates a higher proportion of people describing themselves as Irish. Stronger blue indicates a higher proportion of people describing themselves as British.

Following the reform of local government in Northern Ireland the twenty-six districts created in 1973 were replaced with eleven "super districts". The first election using these districts took place on 22 May 2014, electing councillors who sat in shadow form until 1 April 2015. The breakdown of national identity within these new boundaries at the time of the 2011 census was as follows. (Note: Figures are correct as per source, but totals are over 100% as the 'All usual residents' figure used as the base figure for each district is less than the total of respondents to the question.)

District	British	Irish	Northern Irish	English, Scottish or Welsh	All Other
Antrim and Newtownabbey	62.2%	16.0%	30.9%	1.7%	2.9%
Ards and North Down	72.4%	8.3%	32.4%	2.4%	1.9%
Armagh, Banbridge and Craigavon	50.5%	25.2%	28.9%	1.3%	4.6%
Belfast	43.3%	35.1%	26.9%	1.5%	4.6%
Causeway Coast and Glens	54.3%	21.4%	31.3%	1.9%	2.2%
Derry and Strabane	26.2%	50.8%	26.5%	1.4%	1.8%
Fermanagh and Omagh	33.3%	38.3%	31.0%	1.4%	3.2%
Lisburn and Castlereagh	65.4%	14.8%	30.5%	2.1%	2.7%
Mid and East Antrim	71.4%	9.2%	29.4%	1.7%	2.6%
Mid Ulster	32.5%	38.8%	29.3%	1.0%	5.9%
Newry, Mourne and Down	28.5%	44.3%	30.4%	1.5%	3.3%

== See also ==
- Demographics of Northern Ireland
- Local government in Northern Ireland
- List of districts in Northern Ireland by religion or religion brought up in
- Census in the United Kingdom
- British people
- Irish people
- Northern Irish people
- Ulster Scots people
