= John Simpson (journalist) =

English journalist (born 1944)

John Simpson CBE
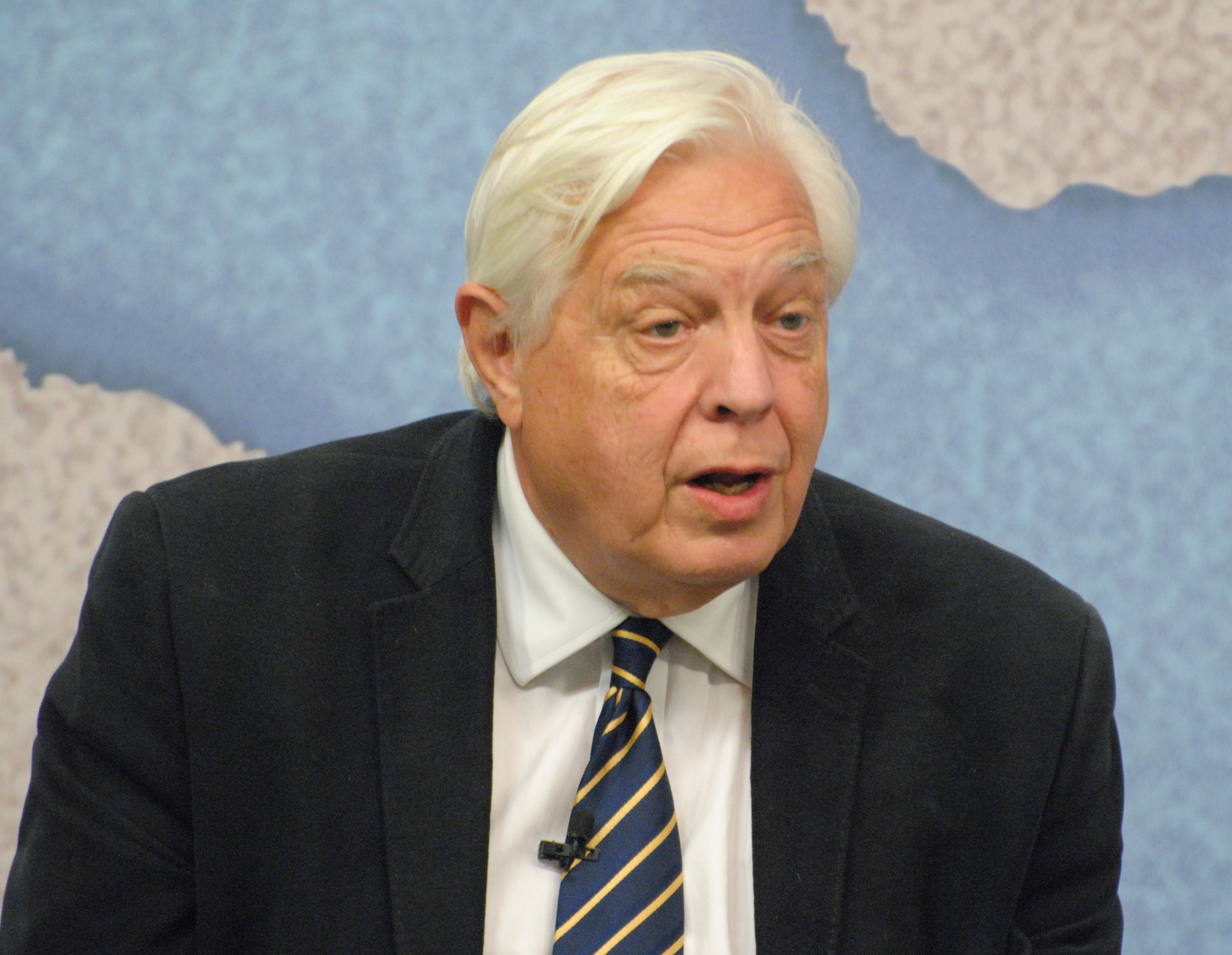
- Simpson in 2015
- Born: John Cody Fidler-Simpson; 9 August 1944 (age 82); Cleveleys, Lancashire, England
- Education: Dulwich College Preparatory School, St Paul's School, Magdalene College, Cambridge
- Occupation: Journalist
- Agent: Kruger Cowne
- Notable credit: BBC News
- Title: Political editor of BBC News (1980–1981); World Affairs Editor of BBC News (1988–present)
- John Simpson's voice from the BBC programme From Our Own Correspondent, 12 July 2013.

John Cody Fidler-Simpson (born 9 August 1944) is an English foreign correspondent who is currently the world affairs editor of BBC News. He holds dual British-Irish citizenship. He has spent all his working life with the BBC, and has reported from more than 120 countries, including thirty war zones, and interviewed many world leaders. He was educated at Magdalene College, Cambridge, where he read English and was editor of Granta magazine.

== Early life and education ==
Simpson was born on 9 August 1944 in Cleveleys, Lancashire, but was taken to his mother's "bomb-damaged house in London" the following week. He says in his autobiography that his father Roy, a property developer, was a Christian Scientist. His parents separated when he was seven years old and he chose to remain with his father while his mother cared for his two half-sisters. He spent ten years growing up in Dunwich in Suffolk. He was educated at Dulwich College Preparatory School and St Paul's School, followed by Magdalene College, Cambridge, where he read English and was editor of Granta magazine. In 1965 he was a member of the Magdalene University Challenge team. A year later Simpson started as a trainee sub-editor at BBC radio news.

== Career ==
Simpson became a BBC reporter in 1966. Early in his career, the then prime minister Harold Wilson, angered by being asked whether he was about to call an election, punched Simpson in the stomach.

Simpson was the BBC's political editor in 1980–81. He presented the Nine O'Clock News in 1981–82 and became diplomatic editor in 1982. He had also served as a correspondent in Dublin, South Africa, Brussels and elsewhere. He became BBC world affairs editor in 1988 and presented an occasional current affairs programme, Simpson's World.

Simpson's reporting career includes the following episodes:

- In November 1969 he interviewed the exiled King of Buganda, Mutesa II, hours before the latter's death in his London flat from alcohol poisoning. The official cause was suicide but some suspected assassination. Simpson told the police the following day that the king, a fellow-graduate of Magdalene College, Cambridge, had been sober and in good spirits, but this line of enquiry was not pursued.
- In 1972 he became the BBC's youngest foreign correspondent when posted to Dublin, after encouragement from his American wife.
- He travelled back from Paris to Tehran with the exiled Ayatollah Khomeini on 1 February 1979, a return that heralded the Iranian Revolution, as millions lined the streets of the capital.
- In 1982 he reported from Lebanon, during military activity from Israel. He was accused of working for British military intelligence, was beaten and tortured, and was subject to a mock execution.
- In 1989 he avoided bullets at the Beijing Tiananmen Square massacre.
- He was in Poland when the Berlin Wall fell in November 1989, but quickly returned to Berlin to cover the story.
- Simpson reported the fall of the Ceauşescu regime in Bucharest later that year.
- He spent time in 1990 and then the early part of the 1991 Gulf War in Baghdad, before being expelled by the authorities.
- He covered one of the earliest environmental conferences, in Brazil in 1992.
- He covered events in South Africa for many years, including the 1994 release of Nelson Mandela, a man Simpson said he 'loved'.
- Simpson reported from Belgrade during the Kosovo War of 1999, where he was one of a handful of journalists to remain in the Yugoslav capital after the authorities, at the start of the conflict, expelled those from NATO countries. He also interviewed Arkan, the Serbian paramilitary leader in Bosnia, at what he felt was a danger to his local team.
- Two years later, having been thrown out of Afghanistan, he was one of the first reporters to reenter the country in 2001, famously disguising himself by wearing a burqa, and subsequently entered Kabul in the US-led invasion of Afghanistan.
- Simpson was hunted by Robert Mugabe's forces in Zimbabwe.
- In 2002 he had an interview with the Dutch politician Pim Fortuyn just four days before his assassination. Fortuyn was not happy with Simpson and his questions and so sent him away just five minutes after the start of the interview.
- He was the first BBC journalist to answer questions in a war zone from internet users via BBC News Online.
- While reporting on a non-embedded basis from Northern Iraq in the 2003 Iraq war, Simpson was injured in a friendly fire incident when a U.S. warplane bombed the convoy of American and Kurdish forces he was with. The attack was caught on film: a member of Simpson's crew was killed and he himself was left deaf in one ear.
- He was present during the subsequent trial of Saddam Hussein, who was then executed, an event which Simpson said confirmed his opposition to capital punishment.
- He interviewed Muammar Gaddafi, the ruler of Libya several times, finding him a most unpleasant character. During the 2011 Libyan civil war Simpson travelled with the rebels during their westward offensive, reporting on the war from the front lines and coming under fire on several occasions.

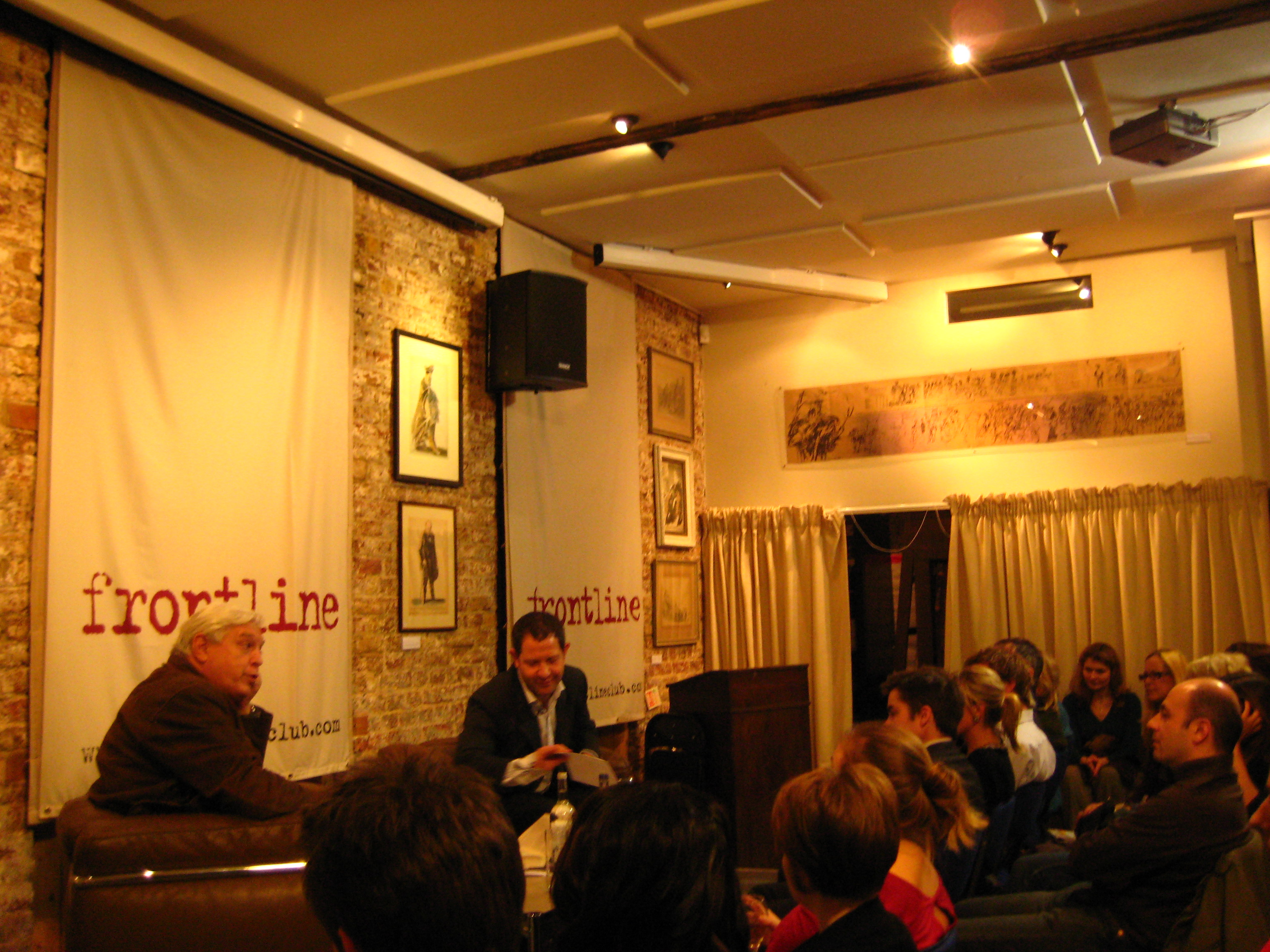
Simpson being questioned about his career by fellow-journalists at London's Frontline Club, October 2007

- In 2023 Simpson interviewed Volodymyr Zelenskyy, the President of Ukraine, whom he said he admired for taking the right and courageous decision when his country was attacked by Russia.

In 2008 and 2009, Simpson participated in a BBC programme called Top Dogs: Adventures in War, Sea and Ice. It saw Simpson unite with fellow Britons Sir Ranulph Fiennes, the adventurer, and Sir Robin Knox-Johnston, the round-the-world yachtsman. The team went on three trips, experiencing each other's adventure field. The first episode, aired on 27 March 2009, saw Simpson, Fiennes and Knox-Johnston go on a news-gathering trip to Afghanistan. The team reported from the Khyber Pass and the Tora Bora mountain complex. The three also undertook a voyage around Cape Horn and an expedition hauling sledges across the deep-frozen Frobisher Bay in the far north of Canada.

In 2016 Simpson presented a Panorama special, "John Simpson: 50 Years on the Frontline", revisiting the people and places that have impacted on him most, revealing his thoughts on the challenges for the future.

In 2018, he described how a previous head of BBC News had recently tried to force him out of the BBC. "I wasn't the only one: he did the same to several eminent broadcasters, on the grounds that the news department was clogged at the top by the aged. I was unsighted by being assured regularly how wonderful my contribution to the BBC was. 'I'd be distraught if you left', he said."

Since 2022 he has regularly presented Unspun World with John Simpson for BBC Television, dissecting political opinions from around the world as their world affairs editor.

In 2026, he celebrated the length of his BBC career with a television programme called Sixty Years at the BBC, in which he covered many of the assignments mentioned above.

== Awards ==
Simpson has received various awards, including a CBE in the Gulf War honours list in 1991, an International Emmy for his report for the BBC Ten O'Clock News on the fall of Kabul, the Golden Nymph at the Cannes Film Festival, a Peabody award in the US, and three BAFTAs. He was appointed an honorary fellow of his old college at Cambridge, Magdalene, in 2000, and became the first Chancellor of Roehampton University in 2005.

Various universities have awarded him honorary doctorates: De Montfort, Suffolk College at the University of East Anglia, Nottingham, Dundee, Southampton, Sussex, St Andrews, Exeter and Leeds. He has received the Ischia International Journalism Award and the Bayeux-Calvados Award for war correspondents. In June 2011 he was made a Freeman of the City of London. Simpson was honoured by the City of Westminster at a Marylebone tree planting ceremony in May 2012.

== Personal life ==
Simpson has two daughters from his first marriage; he has described his wife as a 'gutsy Californian girl'.

He has said that his work and consequent lifestyle affected his relationship with his daughters, first wife and later partner.

He subsequently married Dee (Adele) Kruger, a South African television producer. Their son was born in January 2006, when Simpson was 61. Simpson, whose grandmother was born in Ireland, holds British and Irish citizenship; he moved back to London in 2005 after living in Ireland for several years.

In an interview with the Irish Independent Simpson admitted to using a legal tax avoidance scheme to purchase his London home in 2004, but stated that he would abandon the scheme and pay all applicable domestic taxes on its sale.

He is an Anglican and worships at Chelsea Old Church.

== Bibliography ==
=== Novels ===
- Moscow Requiem (1981)
- A Fine and Private Place (1983)
- Moscow, Midnight (2018)
- Our Friends in Beijing (2021)

=== Non-fiction ===
- The Disappeared: Voices from a Secret War, with Jana Bennett, (1985)
- Behind Iranian Lines (1988)
- Despatches from the Barricades (1990)
- Strange Places, Questionable People (1998)
- A Mad World, My Masters (2000)
- News From No Man's Land (2002)
- The Wars Against Saddam: Taking the Hard Road to Baghdad (2004)
- Days from a Different World: A Memoir of Childhood (2005)
- Not Quite World's End: A Traveller's Tales (2007)
- Twenty Tales From The War Zone (2007)
- Unreliable Sources (2010)
- We Chose to Speak of War and Strife (2016)

Media offices
Preceded by David Holmes	Political Editor: BBC News; 1980–1981	Succeeded by John Cole
Preceded by New Position	World Affairs Editor: BBC News; 1988–present	Succeeded by Incumbent
