= David Holmes (journalist) =

British journalist and broadcaster

David Holmes (c. 1926 - February 2014) was a British journalist and broadcaster who served as the BBC's Political Editor from 1975 to 1980.

He was educated at Allhallows School. In 1956 he became a BBC home news reporter and between 1961 and 1972 was an assistant political correspondent (Deputy Political Editor from 1970) before being appointed Political Editor in 1975. In the same year he provided commentary on the first live transmission from the House of Commons on BBC Radio. He was also (1971) first editor of BBC Radio 4's arts programme Kaleidoscope.

Holmes also had periods as a presenter and within BBC management, latterly as Chief Assistant to the Director-General of the BBC and then as Secretary, before retiring in 1985.

His second wife, journalist Linda Alexander, was a presenter on Newsnight between 1980 and 1983.

Media offices
Preceded by Hardiman Scott	Political Editor: BBC News; 1975–1980	Succeeded by John Simpson
