= Patric Dickinson =

British poet, translator, and playwright (1914–1994)

Patric Thomas Dickinson (26 December 1914 – 28 January 1994) was a British poet, translator from the Greek and Latin classics, and playwright. He also worked for the BBC, from 1942 to 1948. His verse play Theseus and the Minotaur was broadcast by the BBC in July 1945 and published by Jonathan Cape the following year, along with a selection of his poems. He wrote full-time from 1948 and edited (with Sheila Shannon) Personal Portraits, a series of short biographies published by Max Parrish Ltd. and Adprint, London.

He was born in Nasirabad, India. He studied at St. Catharine's College, Cambridge. An autobiography The Good Minute was published in 1965.

He received the Cholmondeley Award in 1973.

Poetry books published include the following, all in the Phoenix Living Poets series:

- The World I See (1960)
- This Cold Universe (1964)
- More Than Time (1970)
- A Wintering Tree (1973)
- The Bearing Beast (1976)
- Our Living John (1979)
- A Rift in Time (1982)

In February 1951 Lambert Williamson composed Living Silence, a choral and speaking choir morality for Liverpool Cathedral, setting a text by Dickinson. It was broadcast on the Third Programme. His verse translation of the Aeneid was published in 1961. It was described by Horace Gregory as "A superlative translation … No other version surpasses it in clarity and vigor."

== Archives ==
Papers of Patric Dickinson are held at the Cadbury Research Library, University of Birmingham.
