= John Hartley Williams =

John Hartley Williams (7 February 1942 – 3 May 2014) was an English poet who was born in Cheshire and grew up in London. He studied at the University of Nottingham and later at the University of London. His 2004 poetry book, Blues, was shortlisted for the T. S. Eliot Prize. He was a judge of the 2007 Poetry on the Lake poetry competition, a judge of the Keats-Shelley Prize for Poetry, and a tutor at the Arvon Foundation. He died from cancer at his home in Berlin in May 2014. He was survived by Gizella, his wife of 44 years, and their daughter.

== Bibliography ==
- Hidden Identities. Chatto & Windus (1982) in the Phoenix Living Poets series
- Bright River Yonder
- Cornerless People
- Double
- Ignoble Sentiments
- Canada
- Spending Time with Walter
- Mystery in Spiderville
- Teach Yourself Writing Poetry. Teach Yourself Books, 2003
- North Sea Improvisation. Privately printed, limited edition, Berlin, 2003
- Blues. Cape Poetry, 2004
- The Ship. Salt Publishing, 2007
- Café des Artistes. Cape Poetry, 2009
