= Stephen Grimason =

Northern Irish journalist (1957–2024)

Personal details
- Born: 27 March 1957 Lurgan, County Armagh, Northern Ireland
- Died: 28 April 2024 (aged 67)
- Occupation: Journalist

Stephen Grimason (27 March 1957 – 28 April 2024) was a Northern Irish journalist who was editor of BBC Northern Ireland. He was known for breaking the news of the Good Friday Agreement in April 1998.

== Career ==
Born in Lurgan, County Armagh, Grimason started his career working in local newspapers including the Lurgan Mail, the Ulster Star in Lisburn and the Banbridge Chronicle. In 1992, he covered the Teebane bombing, being the first reporter on the scene. He covered the Northern Ireland peace process. He later worked as director of communications in the Northern Ireland Executive. He held this role from 2001 to 2016.

== Awards ==
In January 2024, he was awarded a Queen's University Belfast Chancellor's Medal alongside Ken Reid.

== Personal life ==
Grimason had four children and seven grandchildren. In 2022, his younger brother Darryl Grimason died. He was also television presenter for BBC Northern Ireland. Grimason had a heart attack following the death of his brother.

== Death ==
Grimason died following a long battle with cancer in April 2024, at the age of 67.
