= Hardiman Scott =

English journalist, broadcaster and writer

- Born: Jack Hardiman Scott; 2 April 1920; King's Lynn, Norfolk, England
- Died: 15 September 1999 (aged 79); Boxford, Suffolk, England
- Other names: Peter Hardiman Scott
- Title: Political Editor of BBC News (1970–1975)

Jack "Peter" Hardiman Scott (2 April 1920 – 15 September 1999) was an English journalist, broadcaster and writer. He served as the BBC's first political editor, from 1970 to 1975. During his time at the BBC, he reported on, and grew close to, four prime ministers: Harold Macmillan, Alec Douglas-Home, Harold Wilson and Edward Heath.

== Career ==
After working on various provincial newspapers, Hardiman Scott joined the BBC in 1950 as an assistant news editor in Birmingham. In 1954 he became a home affairs correspondent in London before being appointed to the new post of political correspondent in 1960. In 1962 he interviewed the leader of the Labour Party, Hugh Gaitskell, on the Cuban Missile Crisis. In 1970 he became the BBC's first political editor, a position he held until being succeeded by David Holmes in 1975. He then spent five years as Chief Assistant to the Director-General of the BBC before retiring in 1980 to his cottage in Suffolk.

He was also the author of several detective thrillers and books of verse, including When the Words are Gone in the Phoenix Living Poets series, and was the president of the Suffolk Poetry Society from 1979 until his death. In the early 1980s he made substantial progress with a novel in which a left wing government was overthrown by an "establishment" coup, but, after discussion with his publisher, abandoned this because of the striking similarities to Chris Mullin's A Very British Coup (1982).

== Personal life ==
Hardiman Scott was married twice and was survived by his second wife, Sue. He had two sons from his first marriage.

Media offices
Preceded by Position created	Political Editor: BBC News; 1970–1975	Succeeded by David Holmes
