= Rose Neill =

Northern Ireland news broadcaster

Rose Neill MBE
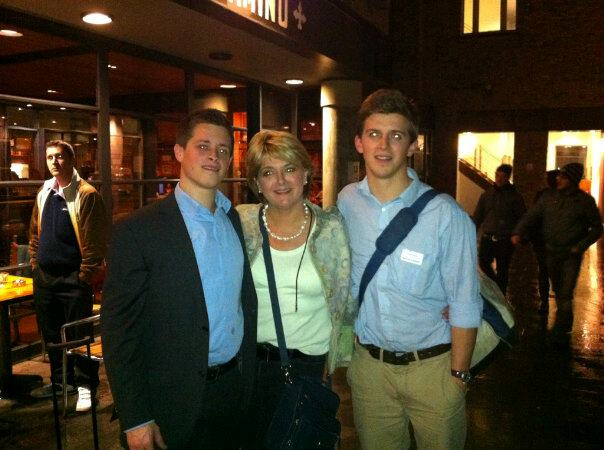
- Born: Northern Ireland
- Occupation: Television Broadcaster
- Known for: TV, Documentaries, Travel writing and Radio

Rose Wilson MBE (née Neill) is a Northern Ireland news broadcaster, currently working for UTV. At the beginning of her career she was the youngest newsreader in the United Kingdom, and she is the longest-serving newscaster in the British Isles, having worked for 49 consecutive years newscasting .

== Early life ==
She received her formal education at The Mount School, York, and went on to study Dispensing Optics at the City and East London College.

== Broadcasting career ==
Neill's broadcasting career began in 1977. Her early career included presenting children's educational programmes and newscasting for Ulster Television. She also worked as a continuity announcer and co-presented Sportscast with Jackie Fullerton.

She moved to BBC Northern Ireland in 1984 to co-present the flagship news programme Inside Ulster alongside Sean Rafferty, and went on to present its replacement BBC Newsline. She also presented a daily three-hour show on BBC Radio Ulster. From 2002 to 2008, Neill was involved in writing and presenting a series of medical documentaries. She also contributed to various BBC Northern Ireland programmes including Children in Need coverage. She left BBC Northern Ireland in August 2008.

In 2009, Neill presented a documentary on the RMS Titanic for UTV, and latterly returned to the station as a freelance newsreader and in-vision continuity announcer. In May 2014, she was appointed as main anchor for UTV Live, alongside Paul Clark.

Neill co-presents the main evening news at 6 and is also a luxury travel writer, who has travelled extensively all her life, and more recently to Asia, India, The Caribbean, North and South America.

== Personal life ==
Neill is an honorary vice-patron of Cancer Focus Northern Ireland, and Chairperson of the Riding for the Disabled Association. She is married and has two children and is involved with the Northern Ireland Mother & Baby Appeal. Her hobbies include riding, hunting, Snow & Water-skiing.
