= Ruth Miller (poet) =

South African poet

- Born: 1919 Uitenhage, South Africa
- Died: 1969 (aged 49–50)
- Genre: Poetry
- Notable awards: Ingrid Jonker Prize

Ruth Miller (1919–1969) was a South African poet.

Born in 1919 in Uitenhage, South Africa, she grew up in the northern Transvaal and spent her adult life in Johannesburg. She worked as a school secretary and later English teacher. She died of cancer in 1969.

She wrote short stories and plays, but is best known for her poems, which were frequently anthologised. She won the Ingrid Jonker Prize for her first volume of poems, Floating Islands (1965). A second collection Selected Poems appeared in 1968 in the Phoenix Living Poets series. After her death a selection of her published and unpublished work Poems, Prose, Plays appeared, edited by Lionel Abrahams.
