= Jane Loughrey =

Journalist

Jane Loughrey is a journalist, originally from north Belfast. She has worked for UTV Television in Ulster between 1992 and 2021 and is a principal journalist for UTV Live. She graduated from Queen's University Belfast and then studied journalism in England. In 2013, she was awarded the Gold prize in the category "feature of the year" from the ITV Regions and Nations News Awards in London, for her programme about the 40th anniversary of the 1972 Bloody Friday bombings. In 2015, Loughrey was honored as the year's best television journalist at the Northern Ireland Media Awards ceremony of the Chartered Institute of Public Relations. In 2018, she was one of the 68 journalists selected to relate their personal memories of The Troubles in the book by Deric Henderson and Ivan Little, Reporting the Troubles: Journalists Tell Their Stories of the Northern Ireland Conflict published by Blackstaff Press. Academic analyses of the events have tried to place them in context of politics and paramilitary organizations, but have sanitized the human cost, which reporters' first-hand accounts make evident.
