= Ken Reid (journalist) =

Northern Irish journalist (1955–2024)

- Born: Kenneth Reid; 23 June 1955; Belfast, Northern Ireland
- Died: 19 November 2024 (aged 69)
- Education: Methodist College Belfast; University of Hull
- Occupation: Journalist
- Years active: 1977–2021

Kenneth Reid (23 June 1955 – 19 November 2024) was a Northern Irish journalist. He retired from his position as political editor at UTV on 31 March 2021. He was succeeded by Tracey Magee.

== Career ==
Reid was born in Belfast on 23 June 1955. His career as a journalist began at News Letter in 1977, where he remained for seven years. This was followed by stints as the sports editor, and later editor, of the Sunday News from 1984 to 1987, and reporting for the Cork Examiner from 1987 to 1994.

Reid joined UTV in 1994. He was one of two journalists at the station believed to have not been considered for a voluntary redundancy package at the station in late 2008. Reid blogged on UTV's website on political affairs in Northern Ireland from May 2008.

== Personal life and death ==
Reid studied at Methodist College Belfast and the University of Hull, becoming involved with the student newspaper at the latter institution. He was married and had three children.

Reid was a fan of Cliftonville, Everton and Ballymena.

In 2017, he revealed he had been diagnosed with a form of leukaemia.

Reid died aged 69, on 19 November 2024.

== Honours ==
Reid received the honour of News Broadcaster of the Year at the CIPR Press and Broadcast Awards in 2005 and 2006.

In January 2024, he was awarded a Queen's University Belfast Chancellor's Medal alongside Stephen Grimason.
