= People of Northern Ireland =

Northern Irish
Total population
- 1,903,173 (2021); According to the 2021 census, 86.5% of the population of NI were born in NI - 93.5% were born in the UK or Republic of Ireland. 19.78% identified themselves as Northern Irish, down from 29.44% in 2011.

Regions with significant populations
- Throughout Northern Ireland; and to a lesser degree the Republic of Ireland and Great Britain (highest proportions in Liverpool, Manchester and Newcastle upon Tyne)

Languages
- English (Ulster English); Irish (Ulster Irish); Scots (Ulster Scots)

Religion
- Predominantly Christianity (45.7% Roman Catholic, 43.7% Protestant, especially Presbyterianism, Anglicanism and Methodism)

Related ethnic groups
- Irish; Scots; Ulster Scots; Ulster Protestants; Irish Catholics; English; Manx; Welsh; Scotch-Irish Americans; Scotch-Irish Canadians

People from Northern Ireland are those born in Northern Ireland who, at the time of their birth, have at least one parent who is a British citizen, an Irish citizen, or otherwise entitled to reside in Northern Ireland indefinitely under the Belfast Agreement.

Most people from Northern Ireland either identify as British, Irish, Northern Irish, (Note: These identites are ordered alphabetically due to the contentious nature of this subject.) or a combination thereof. The 20th century conflict known as The Troubles, which ended in effect in 1998, was primarily caused by tensions between people who had these different identites, and their connections to religion (Protestants and Catholics).

== National identity ==
Map of predominant national identity in the 2011 census in Northern Ireland. Stronger blue is more British. Stronger green is more Irish.

In Northern Ireland, national identity is complex and diverse. The question of national identity was asked in the 2021 census with the three most common identities given being British, Irish and Northern Irish. The 2021 census data also revealed a significant demographic shift, with Catholics outnumbering Protestants for the first time in Northern Ireland's history. Most people of Protestant background consider themselves British, while a majority of people of Catholic background self-describe as Irish. Many people from both communities consider themselves to have a distinct Northern Irish or Ulster identity. This has origins in the 17th-century Plantation of Ulster.

In the early 20th century, most Ulster Protestants and Catholics saw themselves as Irish, with Protestants mostly considering "Irish" to be a distinct category of "British", like Scottish or Welsh. Following the Home Rule Crisis and Irish War of Independence, Protestants gradually began to turn away from Irish identity, as Irish and British nationality came to be seen increasingly as mutually exclusive. In 1968 – just before the onset of the Troubles – 39% of Protestants described themselves as British and 20% of Protestants described themselves as Irish, while 32% chose an Ulster identity. By 1978, following the worst years of the conflict, there had been a large shift in identity amongst Protestants, with the majority (67%) now calling themselves British and only 8% calling themselves Irish. This shift has not been reversed. Meanwhile, the majority of Catholics have continued to see themselves as Irish.

From 1989, 'Northern Irish' began to be included as an identity choice in surveys, and its popularity has grown since then. Some organizations have promoted a distinct Northern Irish or Ulster identity as a way of overcoming sectarian division and recognizing the distinct culture and history of Northern Ireland. In a 1998 survey of students, this was one of the main reasons they gave for so identifying, along with a desire to appear 'neutral'. However, surveys show that Northern Ireland identity tends to have different meanings for Catholics and Protestants. Surveys also show that those choosing 'Northern Irish' alone regard their national identity as less important than those choosing British and Irish.

In recent Northern Ireland censuses, respondents could choose more than one national identity. In 2021:

- 42.8% identified as British, alone or with other national identities
- 33.3% identified as Irish, alone or with other national identities
- 31.5% identified as Northern Irish, alone or with other national identities

The main national identities given in recent censuses were:

National identity of Northern Ireland residents
Identity	2011	2021
British only	39.9%	31.9%
Irish only	25.3%	29.1%
Northern Irish only	20.9%	19.8%
British & Northern Irish	6.2%	8.0%
Irish & Northern Irish	1.1%	1.8%
British, Irish & Northern Irish	1.0%	1.5%
British & Irish	0.7%	0.6%

The numbers for each identity were as follows:

2021 Census
National identity	Respondents
British only	606,300
Irish only	554,400
Northern Irish only	376,400
English, Scottish or Welsh	29,000
Other	113,400

1,073,200 respondents total.

2011 census
National Identity	Respondents
British only	876,577
Northern Irish only	533,085
Irish only	513,390
English, Scottish or Welsh	29,187
Other	61,884

1,137,546 respondents total.

National Identity by Religion (2011)

Those people in Northern Ireland who fall into the category of other religions amounts to less than one percent of the population.

National Identity	All	Catholic	Protestant and other Christian	Other religions	No religion
British	48.4%	12.9%	81.6%	50.1%	55.9%
Irish	28.4%	57.2%	3.9%	12.4%	14.0%
Northern Irish	29.4%	30.7%	26.9%	18.0%	35.2%
English, Scottish or Welsh	1.6%	0.8%	1.5%	2.9%	5.2%
All other	3.4%	4.4%	1.0%	29.1%	7.1%

Detail by Religion (2011)

Note that Northern Ireland is made up of approximately 42% Protestant; 41% Roman Catholic; 17% no religion; and 0.8% other religions.

National Identity	All	Catholic	Protestant and other Christian	Other religions	No religion
British only	39.9%	10.3%	68.3%	42.4%	42.9%
Irish only	25.3%	53.2%	2.1%	8.1%	9.4%
Northern Irish only	20.9%	26.9%	14.5%	12.0%	23.7%
British and Northern Irish only	6.2%	0.9%	11.1%	3.3%	7.9%
Irish and Northern Irish only	1.1%	2.0%	0.2%	0.5%	0.8%
British, Irish and Northern Irish only	1.0%	0.8%	1.0%	1.0%	2.1%
British and Irish only	0.7%	0.8%	0.5%	0.7%	1.0%
English, Scottish or Welsh only	1.0%	0.6%	0.8%	2.1%	3.5%
Other	4.0%	4.7%	1.6%	29.9%	8.7%
Total	100.0%	100.0%	100.0%	100.0%	100.0%

National Identity by District (2011)

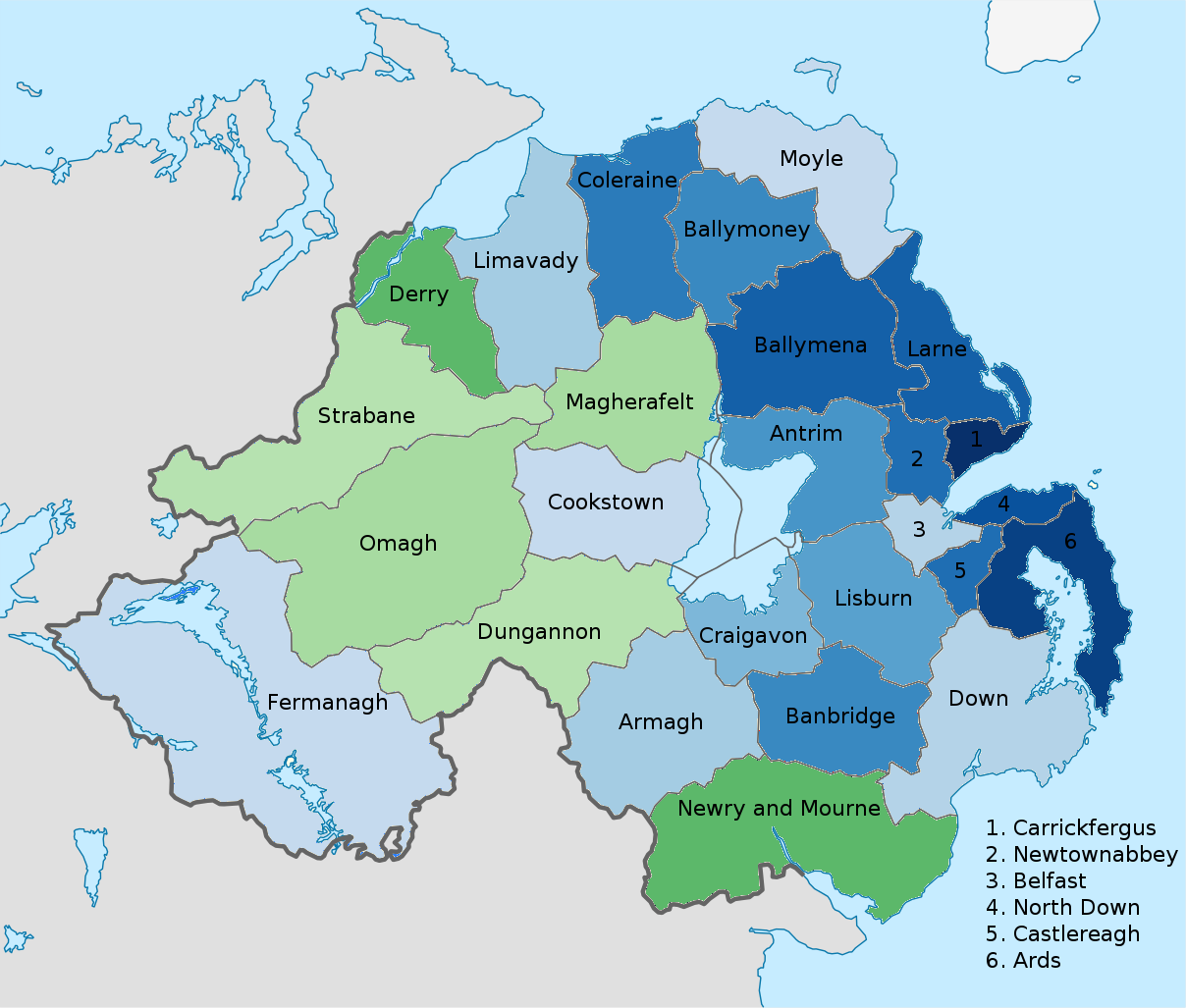
Map of districts of Northern Ireland colour coded to show the predominant national identity. Stronger green indicates a higher proportion of people describing themselves as Irish. Stronger blue indicates a higher proportion of people describing themselves as British. Percentages show the difference between the proportion of people describing themselves as Irish and the proportion of people describing themselves as British. Data from 2011 census

District	British	Irish	Northern Irish	English, Scottish or Welsh	All Other
Antrim	55.2%	20.1%	30.4%	2.3%	3.9%
Ards	73.6%	7.5%	31.9%	1.9%	1.5%
Armagh	44.4%	32.4%	27.1%	1.1%	3.9%
Ballymena	69.0%	11.1%	27.9%	1.4%	3.8%
Ballymoney	60.6%	16.4%	30.9%	1.7%	1.7%
Banbridge	61.1%	16.2%	31.8%	1.5%	1.8%
Belfast	43.2%	34.8%	26.8%	1.5%	5.1%
Carrickfergus	76.5%	5.3%	30.3%	2.1%	1.8%
Castlereagh	66.2%	14.7%	31.3%	1.5%	2.6%
Coleraine	62.4%	14.5%	31.6%	2.0%	3.2%
Cookstown	37.3%	33.5%	32.1%	1.2%	3.7%
Craigavon	48.3%	25.6%	28.7%	1.4%	6.4%
Derry	23.7%	55.0%	24.6%	1.4%	2.0%
Down	40.2%	32.2%	34.1%	1.9%	2.0%
Dungannon	30.9%	38.8%	27.1%	0.9%	9.6%
Fermanagh	37.2%	36.1%	29.5%	1.7%	3.1%
Larne	69.8%	10.1%	31.4%	2.1%	1.2%
Limavady	42.2%	32.0%	30.7%	1.5%	1.4%
Lisburn	55.6%	24.7%	28.7%	2.0%	2.4%
Magherafelt	31.4%	42.7%	29.8%	1.0%	2.8%
Moyle	38.6%	34.1%	32.1%	2.2%	1.4%
Newry and Mourne	20.2%	53.0%	27.6%	1.2%	4.3%
Newtownabbey	66.5%	13.4%	31.2%	1.3%	2.4%
North Down	71.1%	9.1%	33.0%	3.0%	2.4%
Omagh	28.6%	40.9%	32.7%	1.1%	3.4%
Strabane	33.0%	39.2%	31.8%	1.4%	1.3%

National identity by religion or religion brought up in for each district (2011)

District	Catholic				Protestant and other Christian				Other Religion or None			
District	British	Irish	Northern Irish	All Other	British	Irish	Northern Irish	All Other	British	Irish	Northern Irish	All Other
Antrim	23.1%	43.7%	34.2%	7.1%	80.6%	3.1%	27.8%	3.3%	60.4%	6.5%	26.8%	19.0%
Ards	34.1%	31.7%	38.2%	6.4%	80.9%	3.7%	30.4%	2.2%	67.7%	6.0%	35.1%	9.1%
Armagh	7.1%	62.5%	28.7%	6.2%	81.6%	3.6%	25.7%	2.3%	49.3%	10.5%	25.1%	25.3%
Ballymena	24.6%	38.9%	34.7%	11.0%	83.6%	2.7%	25.7%	2.5%	62.3%	6.5%	28.4%	14.4%
Ballymoney	19.0%	44.5%	38.8%	4.1%	81.1%	2.9%	27.2%	2.2%	65.1%	8.4%	28.0%	13.3%
Banbridge	22.6%	41.7%	39.4%	4.5%	81.2%	3.8%	27.7%	2.0%	59.1%	8.3%	33.8%	11.5%
Belfast	11.7%	64.3%	25.0%	5.6%	78.3%	5.5%	28.7%	3.6%	47.7%	13.3%	27.5%	26.3%
Carrickfergus	41.1%	24.6%	35.6%	10.7%	82.0%	3.0%	29.2%	2.4%	68.3%	5.3%	33.7%	8.5%
Castlereagh	22.1%	50.0%	34.5%	6.3%	81.3%	3.9%	29.9%	2.3%	61.9%	8.9%	33.7%	11.8%
Coleraine	25.0%	39.2%	36.5%	8.4%	79.1%	4.3%	29.3%	2.6%	56.5%	10.3%	33.4%	16.8%
Cookstown	8.1%	53.8%	37.7%	5.2%	82.5%	3.6%	24.0%	2.1%	44.2%	9.1%	24.4%	31.5%
Craigavon	12.2%	51.2%	31.5%	10.6%	82.5%	3.2%	26.3%	2.7%	49.9%	9.1%	26.7%	26.4%
Derry	7.3%	70.5%	24.3%	2.5%	76.7%	7.2%	25.9%	3.5%	39.4%	24.7%	21.9%	26.2%
Down	20.1%	47.4%	37.1%	2.9%	77.4%	5.6%	28.7%	3.6%	52.1%	14.4%	32.1%	16.7%
Dungannon	5.7%	57.6%	28.6%	13.0%	79.6%	4.5%	24.5%	3.0%	33.3%	12.0%	22.8%	42.1%
Fermanagh	11.4%	56.2%	32.4%	4.8%	77.1%	6.2%	25.5%	3.0%	43.4%	16.8%	24.0%	28.1%
Larne	38.8%	30.6%	37.7%	3.0%	81.7%	3.0%	28.6%	2.5%	64.1%	6.5%	35.4%	12.1%
Limavady	18.1%	50.5%	34.4%	2.5%	79.8%	4.1%	24.9%	2.5%	51.4%	10.9%	28.8%	18.7%
Lisburn	16.5%	58.6%	27.8%	4.3%	80.2%	4.7%	29.0%	3.2%	62.2%	8.8%	30.3%	13.9%
Magherafelt	6.5%	62.1%	33.0%	3.8%	82.4%	4.2%	23.1%	2.3%	46.9%	13.4%	30.2%	22.1%
Moyle	14.6%	53.1%	35.3%	2.8%	76.3%	5.0%	27.8%	3.3%	49.4%	17.8%	23.8%	19.8%
Newry and Mourne	7.1%	64.7%	28.0%	5.0%	76.3%	5.8%	26.8%	3.8%	34.6%	22.8%	22.1%	28.9%
Newtownabbey	24.7%	46.1%	34.1%	5.7%	80.9%	3.4%	30.1%	1.7%	63.1%	7.3%	32.1%	12.3%
North Down	37.1%	31.5%	36.1%	9.7%	78.8%	5.2%	31.9%	3.4%	63.7%	7.9%	35.7%	11.6%
Omagh	8.7%	55.7%	36.0%	4.4%	78.5%	4.9%	25.0%	2.5%	40.6%	15.9%	23.7%	28.9%
Strabane	8.9%	57.4%	35.4%	2.6%	79.2%	4.7%	25.2%	1.9%	40.9%	21.1%	25.5%	26.4%

National Identity by Age (2011)

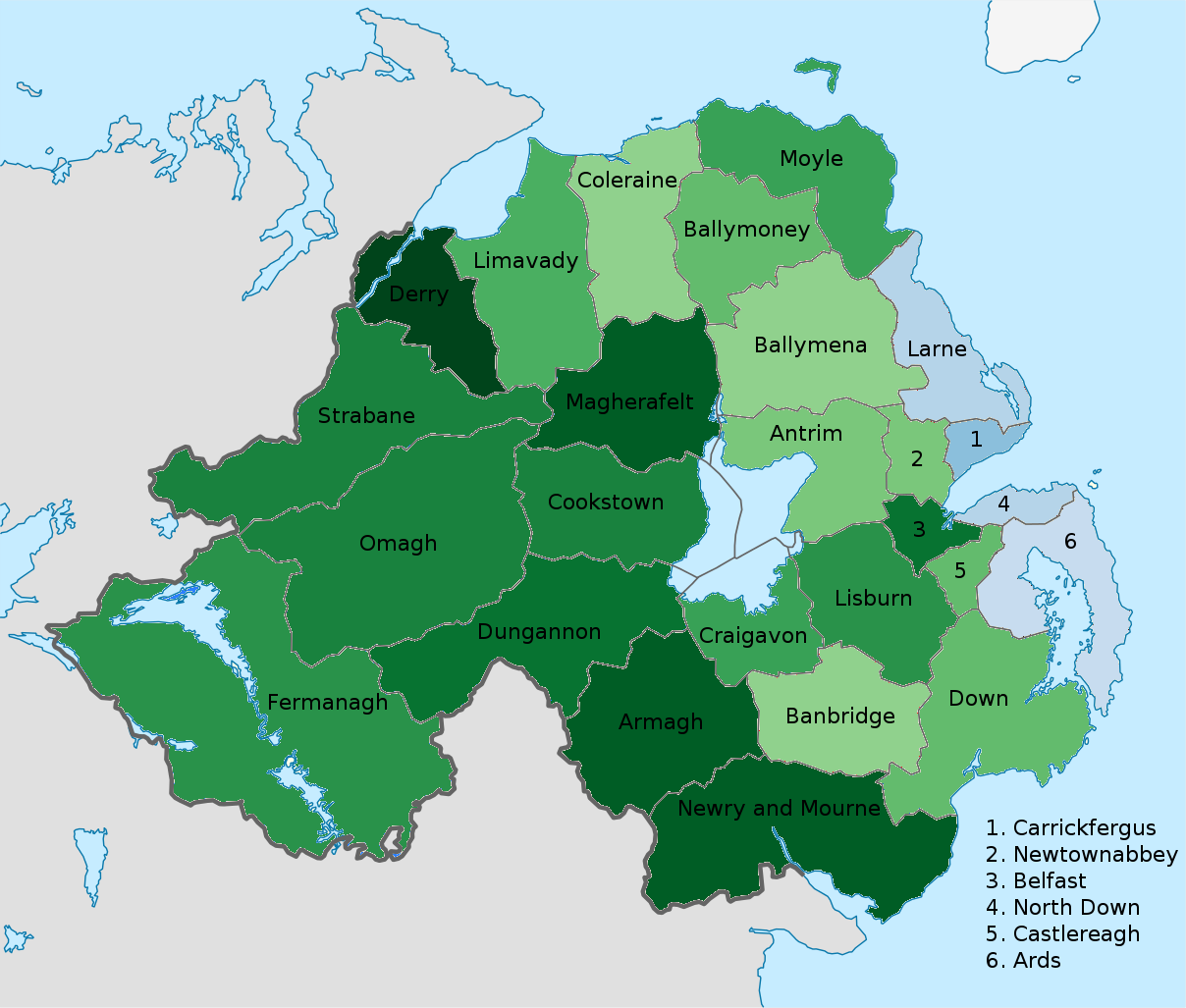
Map of districts of Northern Ireland colour coded to show the predominant national identity amongst Catholics. Stronger green indicates a higher proportion of Catholics describing themselves as Irish. Blue indicates a higher proportion of Catholics describing themselves as British than as Irish. Percentages show the difference between the proportion of Catholics describing themselves as Irish and the proportion of Catholics describing themselves as British. Data from 2011 census

Ages attained (years)	British	Irish	Northern Irish	English, Scottish or Welsh	All other
0 to 15	45.1%	31.4%	30.5%	0.9%	3.6%
16 to 24	44.2%	32.3%	29.6%	1.5%	3.3%
25 to 34	40.5%	31.0%	30.0%	1.7%	8.6%
35 to 44	47.3%	28.7%	29.3%	2.1%	4.5%
45 to 54	50.8%	28.3%	28.0%	1.9%	2.2%
55 to 64	54.5%	24.9%	28.8%	1.9%	1.1%
65 to 74	57.5%	21.3%	29.8%	1.7%	0.4%
75 to 84	58.6%	19.6%	29.1%	1.6%	0.3%
85 and over	61.7%	18.0%	26.5%	2.0%	0.2%

=== National identity surveys ===
In 1998 the Northern Ireland Life and Times Survey started asking respondents whether they think of themselves as British, Irish, Ulster, or Northern Irish. According to the 2019 survey of this series, individuals from Northern Ireland identify as:

- British (39%)
- Irish (25%)
- Northern Irish (27%)
- Ulster (1%)
- Other (8%)
2007 survey: How strongly do you feel yourself to be British/Irish/Ulster/Northern Irish?

In the 2007 Northern Ireland Life and Times Survey, the question was asked, "thinking about each of these national identities in turn, how strongly do you feel yourself to be [Irish/British/Northern Irish/Ulster?]" Individuals responded for each of the identities as follows:

Northern Irish

- Very strongly 50%
- Not very strongly 34%
- Not at all 15%
- Don't know 0%

British

- Very strongly 37%
- Not very strongly 41%
- Not at all 22%
- Don't know 0%

Irish

- Very strongly 36%
- Not very strongly 41%
- Not at all 23%
- Don't know 0%

Ulster

- Very strongly 31%
- Not very strongly 40%
- Not at all 28%
- Don't know 1%

== Languages ==
In the 2021 census of Northern Ireland, 95.37% of people spoke English as a First Language, with 1.10% speaking Polish, 0.49% speaking Lithuanian and 0.32% speaking Irish. In the 2021 Northern Ireland Census, 0.32% of the population (5,969 people) reported Irish as their main home language, up from 0.24% (4,164 people) in 2011, a 43% increase. Additionally, 12.4% (228,600 people) reported some ability in Irish, a 23.7% rise from 10.7% (184,898 people) in 2011, reflecting significant growth in Irish language usage, driven by increased Irish-medium education and legislative recognition, such as the Identity and Language Act of 2022. At the same time, 1.14% of the population said they could speak and read Ulster Scots.

== Emigration ==
In 2022, 24,700 people left NI to live elsewhere; just over half of these moved to other parts of the UK.

It is estimated that between 1921 and 1999, about half a million people left NI.

== Rural settlements ==
In 2020, it was noted that 40% of people in NI live in a rural setting. It was also noted that over 49,000 people were involved in the farming industry (1 in 40 people).

== See also ==
- Demographics of Northern Ireland
- Two nations theory (Ireland)
- Ulster nationalism
- Ulster Protestants
- Ulster Scots people
- List of districts in Northern Ireland by national identity
- List of people from Northern Ireland
- Women in Northern Ireland
