= Linen Quarter, Belfast =

Area of Belfast, Northern Ireland

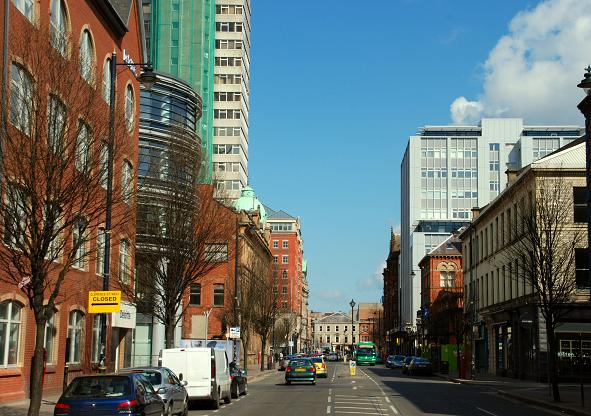
Bedford Street

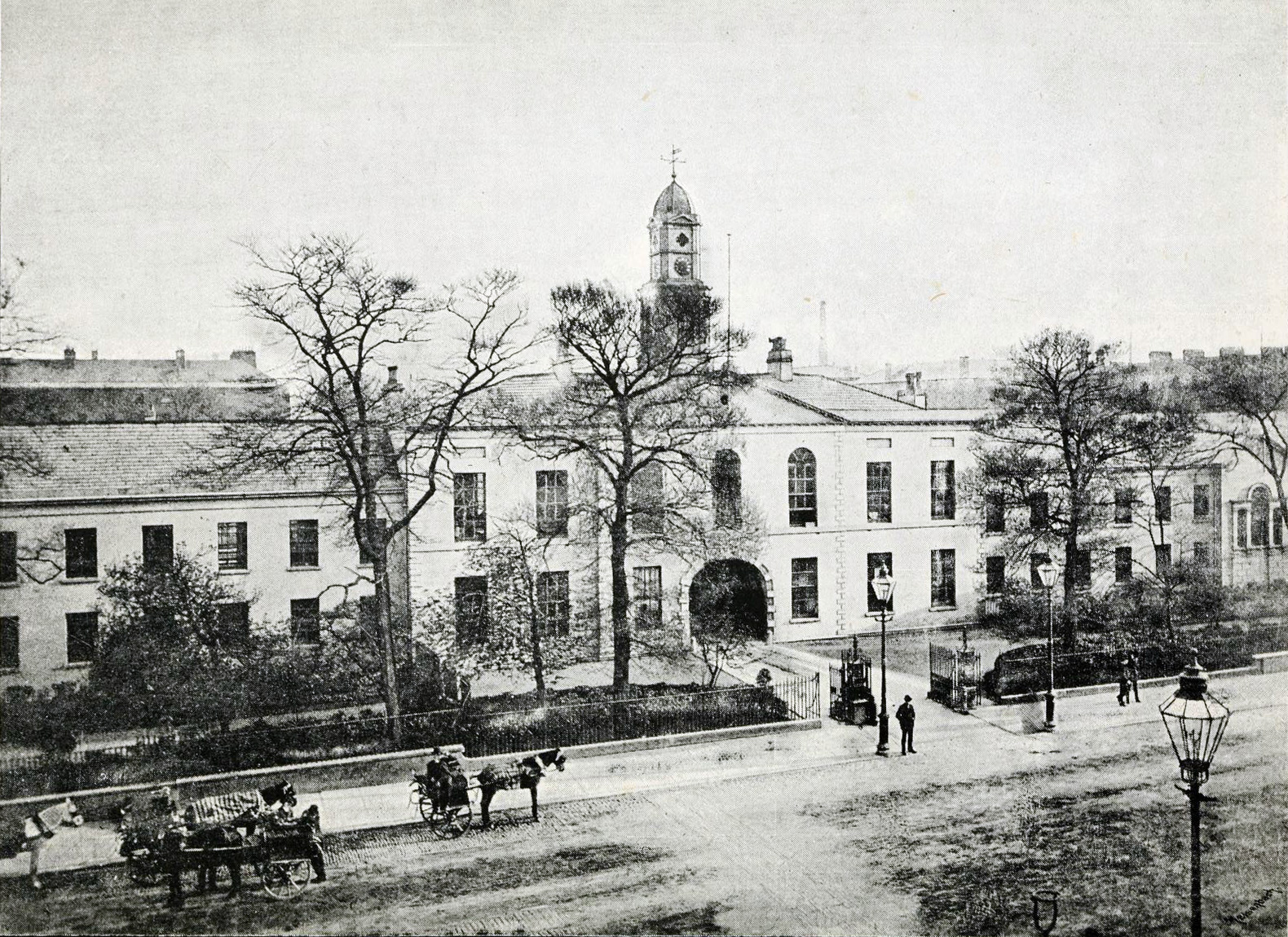
The White Linen Hall as it was in 1888, photographed from Donegall Square North. Now replaced by Belfast City Hall.

The Linen Quarter is an area of Belfast, Northern Ireland. The name is derived from the great many linen warehouses that are still present in the area. The Linen Quarter is host to some of the major cultural venues of Belfast, including the Ulster Hall and Grand Opera House, alongside a large number of hotels, bars, restaurants and cafes. The district also includes the main transport hub of Belfast.

The linen trade that used to dominate this part of the city has now been replaced by international consultancy firms and many technology start ups. Belfast City Council and a number of central government departments are also headquartered in the Linen Quarter. The Linen Quarter is supported by the Linen Quarter Business Improvement District, which is a democratically elected body that also promotes the area and helps co-ordinate improvements across the district.

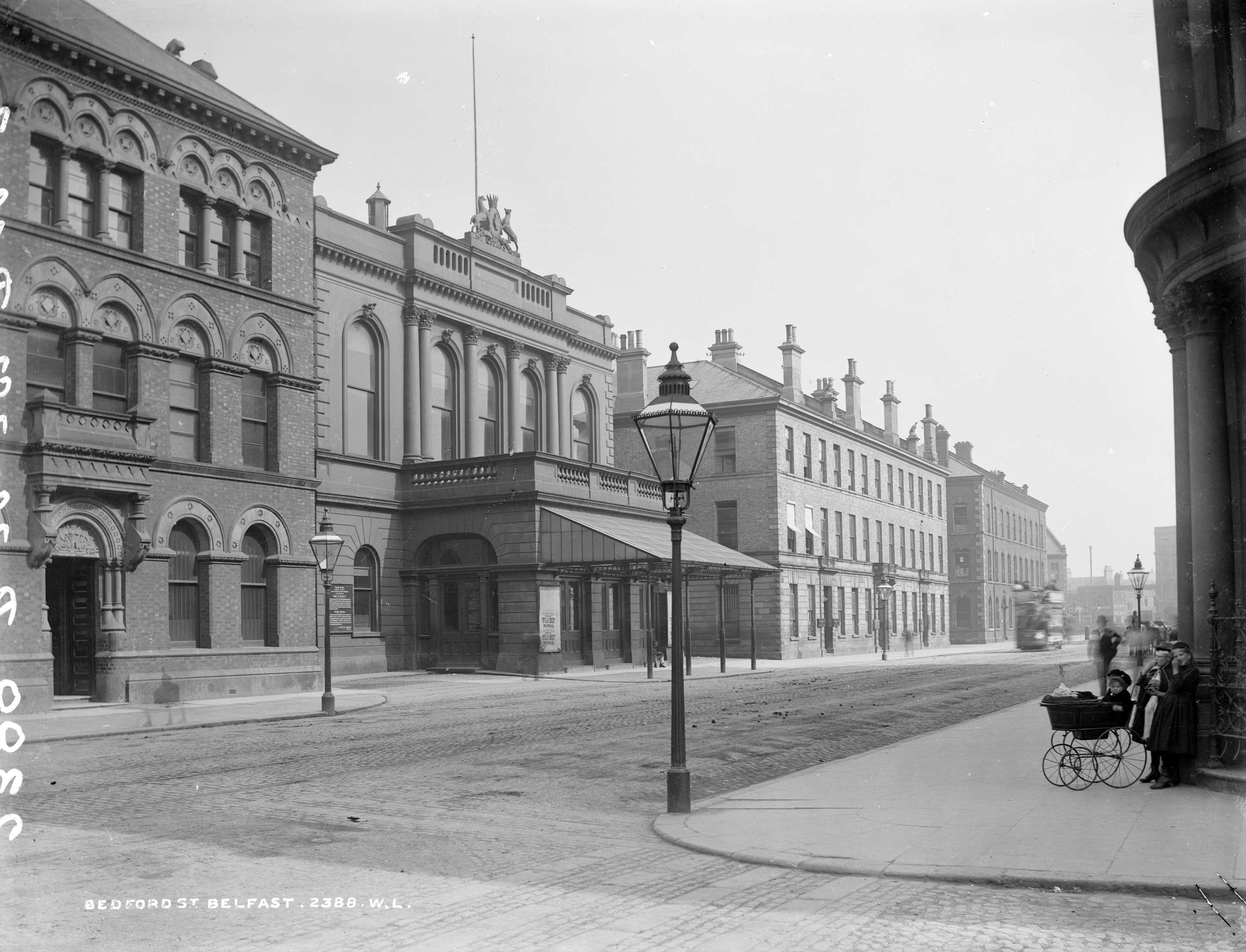
Bedford Street with Ulster Hall in 1902

== Geography of the Linen Quarter ==
The Linen Quarter is the area of Belfast city centre south of the City Hall. Traditionally the district was understood to occupy an approximate square shaped area bounded by Howard Street/Donegall Square South/May Street, Great Victoria Street, Ormeau Avenue and Joy Street. Since the formation of Linen Quarter BID in 2018, however, the district is often considered to have a wider footprint that includes the Europa Transport Hub and parts of Dublin Road.

== Transport ==
The Belfast Hub area has long been at the heart of transport in the city, linking Belfast with the rest of the island. After plans for the Ulster Railway were announced in 1835, Belfast joined the railway revolution in 1839, when the first section from Belfast to Lisburn was opened for passenger traffic. A fitting railway terminus was built on Great Victoria Street and opened in 1848. The completion of the Dublin and Belfast Junction Railway made Victoria Street, soon known as ‘Great Victoria Street’, the terminus for one of the most important main lines in Ireland. Over the next decades commuter traffic to from neighbouring towns to Belfast grew rapidly.

One of the main modes of urban transport was the horse-drawn tram, introduced by the Belfast Street Tramway Company From 1872. In the early 1900s, the network was electrified to make this form of transport more affordable. Buses were introduced by Belfast Corporation (Belfast City Council) in 1926, initially to supplement the tram service, but gradually replacing them. The last tram ran in 1954 and the last trolleybus in 1968.

During the 1960s much of the original terminal at Great Victoria Street was demolished to make way for the development of the Europa Hotel and a bus station. However, in 1995 a second Great Victoria Street Station opened just yards from the site of its predecessor. Following the success of this station, a new enlarged Transport Hub is planned to replace both the existing bus station and railway station.

== Art and architecture of the Linen Quarter ==
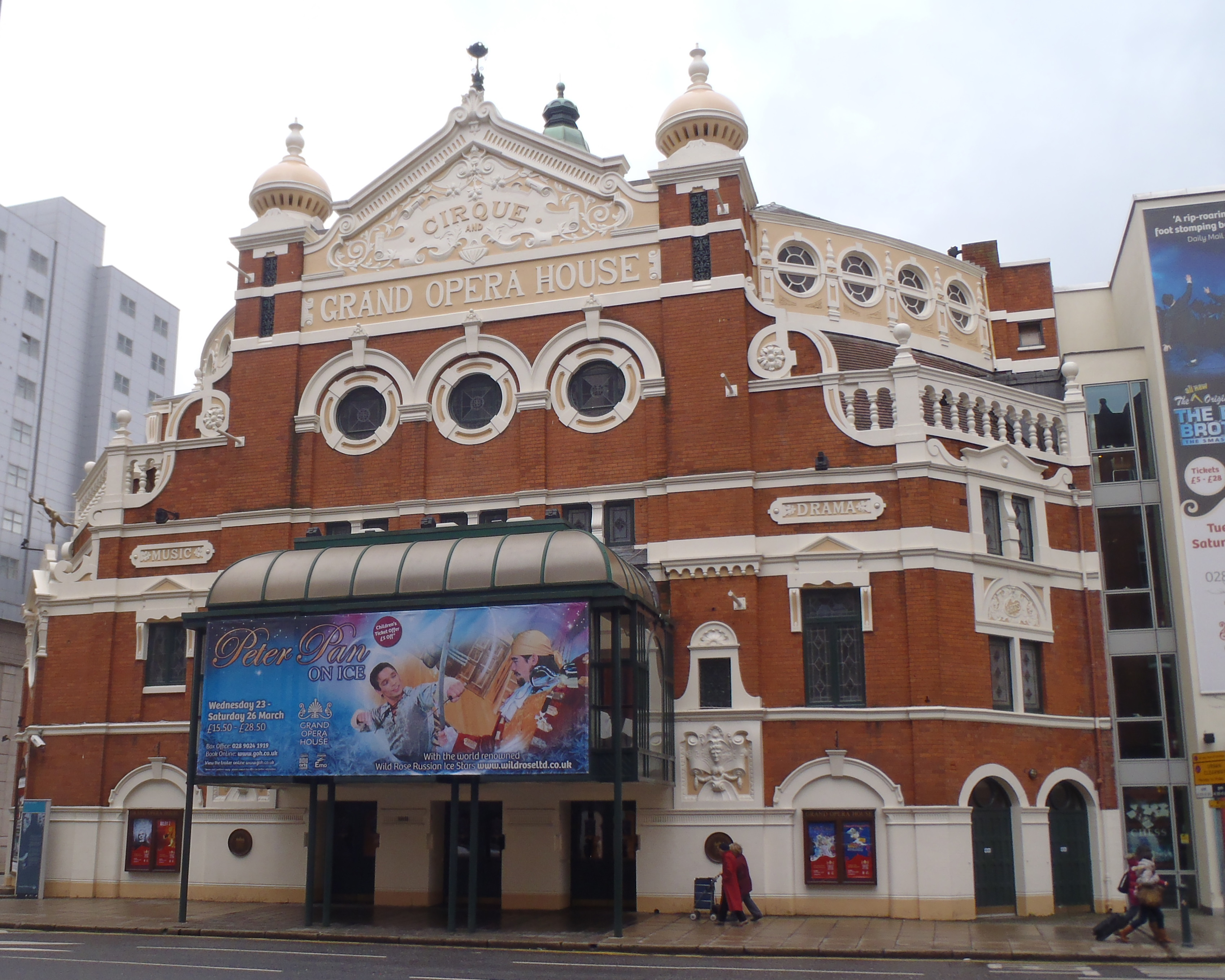
Grand Opera House

=== Grand Opera House, Great Victoria Street ===
The Grand Opera House was constructed in 1894–5 to designs by Frank Matcham, the leading theatre designer of his day. The theatre was expected to accommodate opera, variety, pantomime and circus and could be adapted to fulfil the varying requirements of each type of entertainment. The Grand Opera House was declared open on 16 December 1895, a week before the opening performance, a pantomime called ‘Blue Beard’.

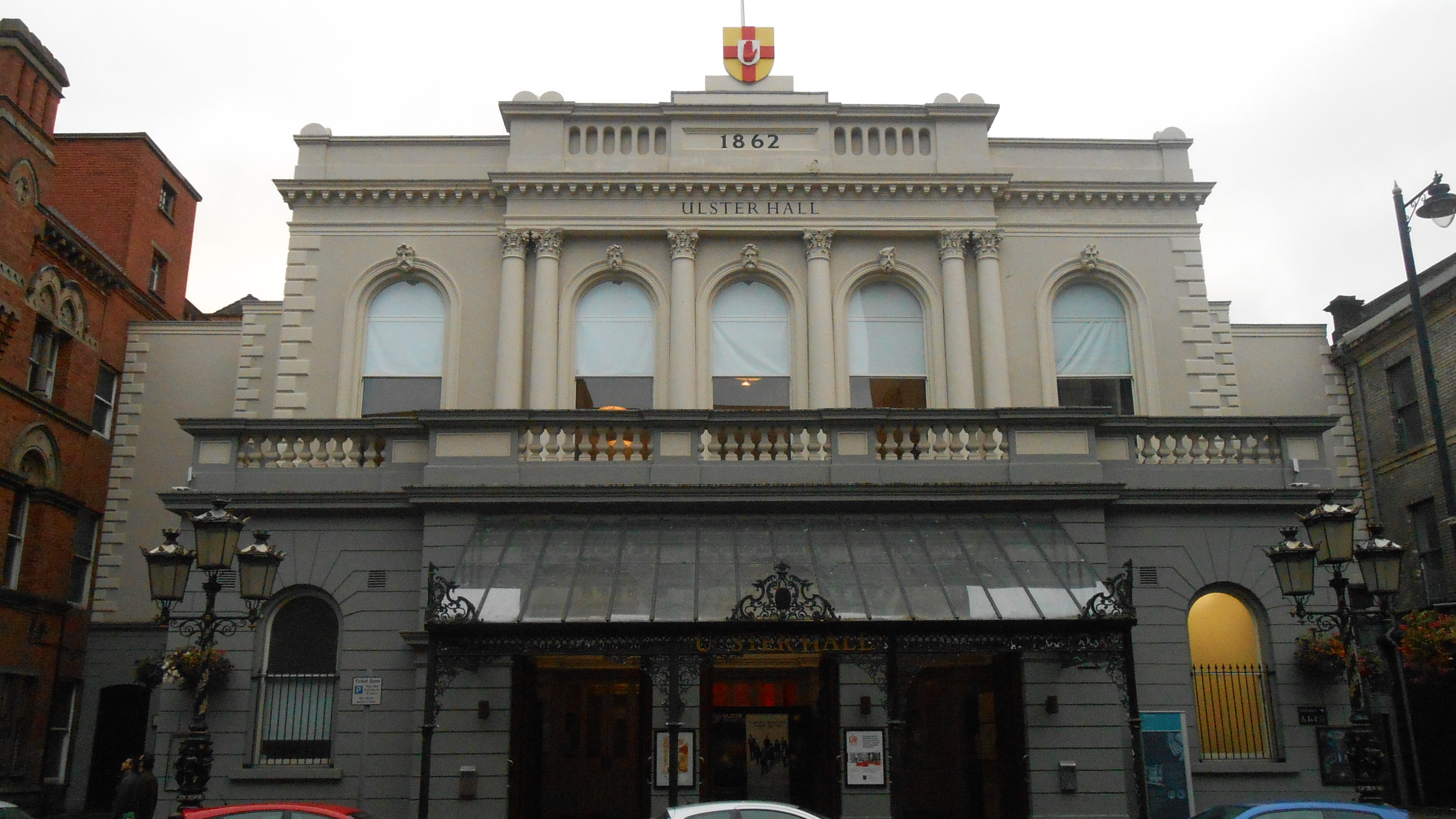
Ulster Hall

=== Ulster Hall, Bedford Street ===
The Ulster Hall is a two-storey Italianate entertainment hall with double-height auditorium that is prominently located on Bedford Street in Belfast city centre. It was completed in 1862 to the designs and under the supervision of William Joseph Barre. A source of immense civic pride on its opening, the building was a sign of Belfast's growing maturity as a town and an acknowledgement among its industrious merchants of the importance of ‘relaxation, pleasure and enjoyment’.

=== Joseph Carey's Belfast scenes ===
In 1902, Belfast City Council commissioned the local artist Joseph W. Carey to produce thirteen scenes from Belfast history on canvas, to be mounted within the Ulster Hall. The scenes depict the city and the surrounding area, incorporating historical and mythological influences. The paintings were restored in 1989 and again in 2009.

=== Ewart’s Buildings ===
This three storey sandstone building was built for the Bedford Street Weaving Company by James Hamilton of Glasgow in 1869. It was extended by James Ewart in 1883 and again, to the rear, in 1937 (though this was later demolished). In 1876 it was purchased by William Ewart and Son, one of the world's leading linen manufacturers who owned mills, warehouses and offices throughout Belfast and beyond.

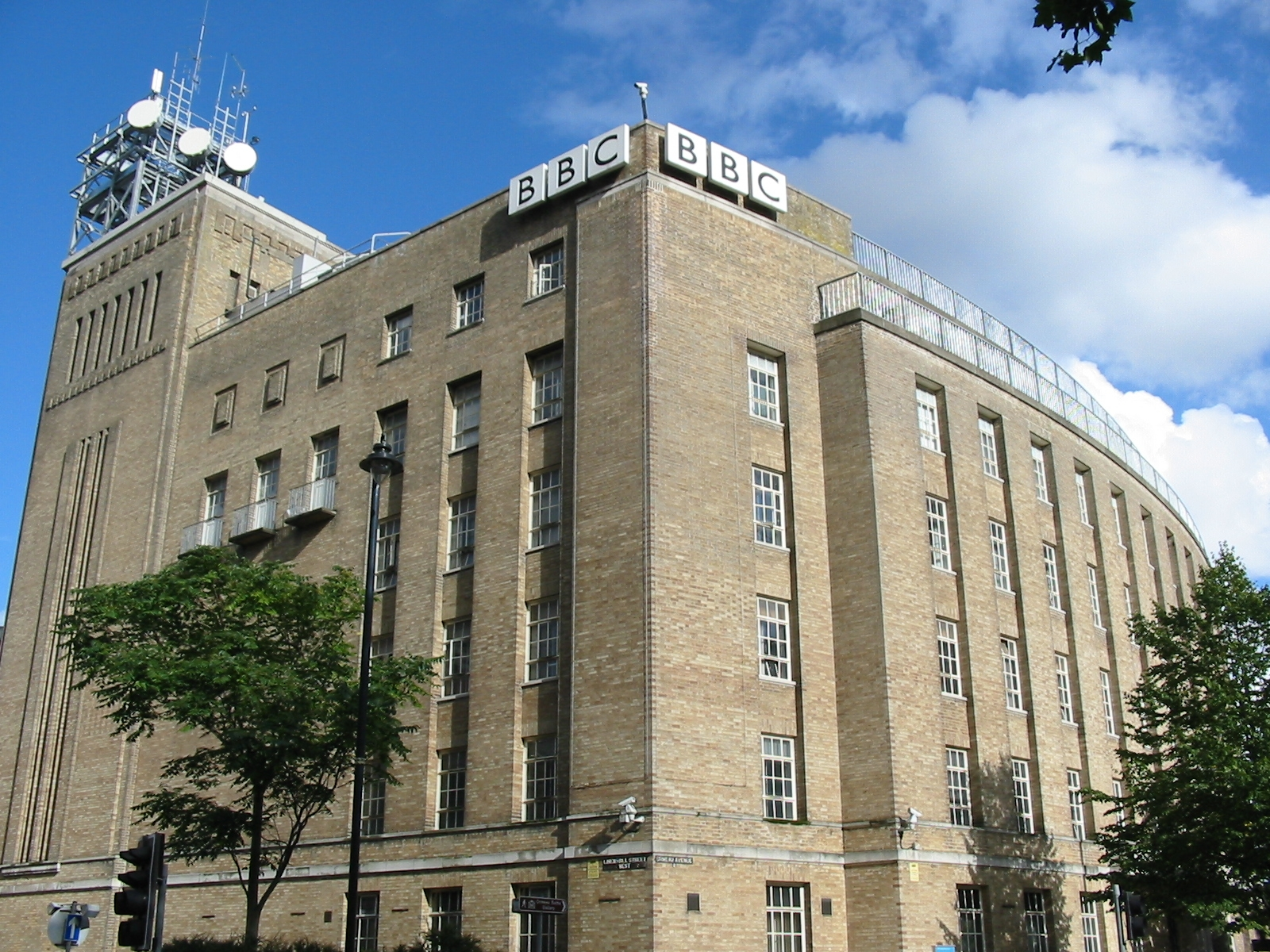
Broadcasting House

=== Broadcasting House, Ormeau Avenue ===
The six-storey multi-bay modernist BBC Broadcasting House was completed in 1939 to the designs of architect James Millar and features a distinctive steel framed, polychromatic brick building. Broadcasting House replaced the BBC's earlier premises on Linenhall Street which it had occupied since the creation of the first regional station in the 1920s.

=== Ormeau Baths, Ormeau Avenue ===
This beautiful Victorian building began life as the public baths for the South Belfast area. Designed by Robert Watt, it opened in the late 1880s. For many local people whose houses lacked sanitation it was a godsend, not least for those working in industry. The Queen Anne Style red brick building contained both individual baths and a swimming pool and, with its sister establishments in the rest of Belfast, greatly improved hygiene in the city.

=== The Thomas Thompson Memorial Fountain, Ormeau Avenue ===
This fountain is located on the intersection of Bedford Street and Ormeau Avenue, facing the BBC offices. It was erected as a special memorial to Ex-naval surgeon Thomas Thompson, one of Belfast's pioneers in the fight against cholera, who also founded the Belfast's Charitable Home for the Incurables. The monument was commissioned by his daughter Eliza and designed by Young and MacKenzie, the preeminent Belfast architectural firm of the time.

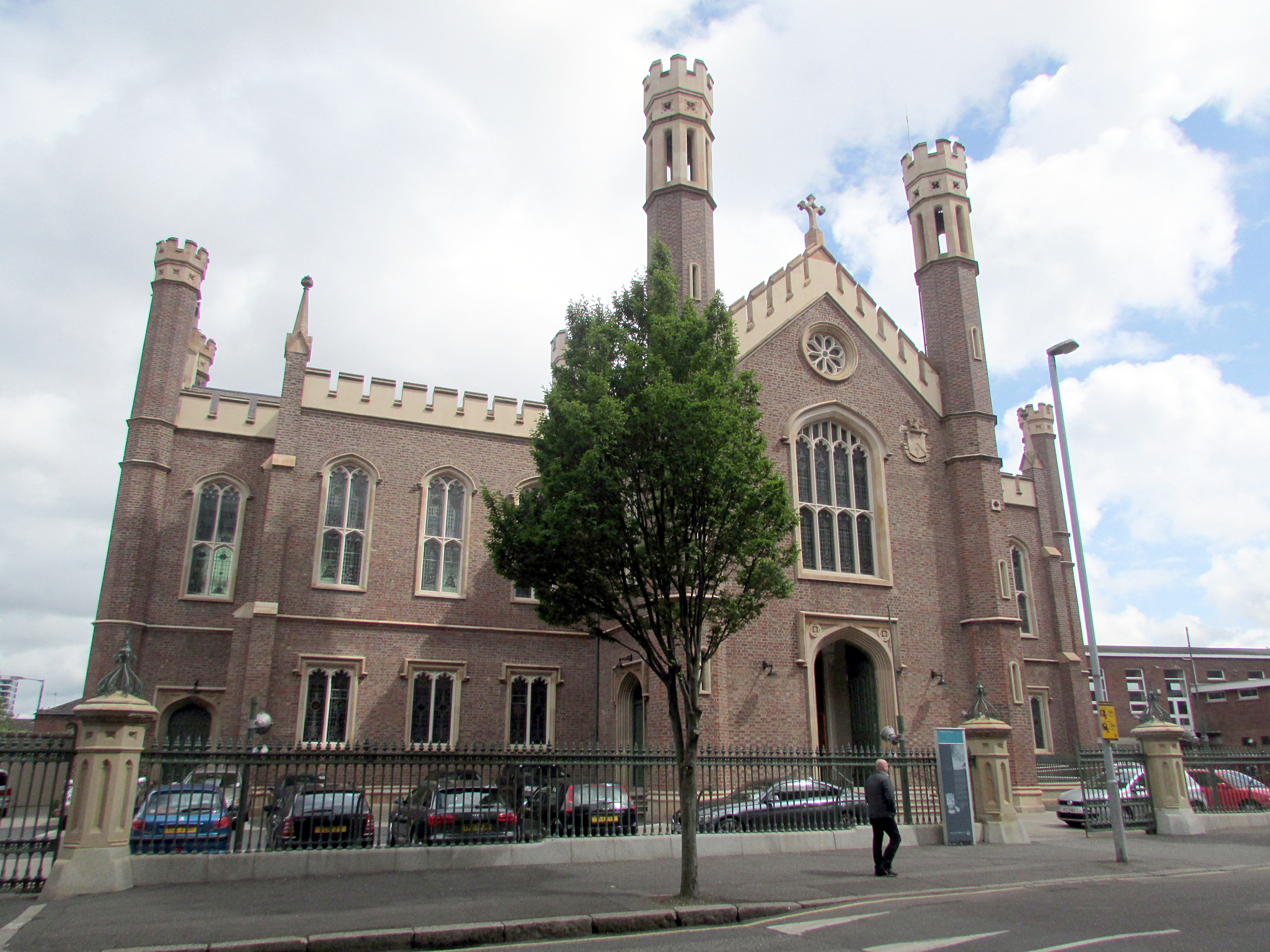
St Malachy's

=== St Malachy’s, Alfred Street ===
One of the most famous, and beautiful, churches in Belfast, St Malachy's, was completed in 1844. It is designed in the ecclesiastical style of the Tudor period by Thomas Jackson. The church's vaulted ceiling, described as ‘an upside down wedding cake’, was inspired by the Henry VII chapel in Westminster Abbey. In 2009 a multi-million pound restoration included the renovation of the ceiling and the cleaning of the beautiful stained glass windows.

=== Monument to the Unknown Woman Worker, Great Victoria Street ===
The Monument to the Unknown Woman Worker is a 1992 bronze sculpture by Louise Walsh and is located adjacent to the Europa Hotel. It features two working-class women with symbols of women's work and domestic items such as colanders, a shopping basket and clothes pegs part of the sculpture.

== Notable events ==
In 1869 Charles Dickens read ‘A Christmas Carol’, ‘The Pickwick Papers’ and ‘David Copperfield’ at two separate readings at the Ulster Hall.

The Conservative Party in Ulster launched an anti-Home Rule campaign in February 1886. It joined with the Orange Order to organise a huge political rally in Ulster Hall at which Lord Randolph Churchill (father of Winston) gave a rousing speech that urged unionists to organise against Home Rule.

The BBC opened its first studio in Linenhall Street. Actor and broadcaster Tyrone Guthrie made the first broadcast here on 15 September 1924.

Led Zeppelin debuted with their song Stairway to Heaven at the Ulster Hall in 1971.

In 1978, the National Trust, purchased the Crown Liquor Saloon following a public campaign led by influential conservationists including Sir John Betjeman.

== People associated with the Linen Quarter ==
Francis Joy (3 August 1697 – 10 June 1790) established Belfast's first paper mill along the Blackstaff River, on grounds near the eastern end of today's Ormeau Avenue. Joy was an entrepreneur who founded the Belfast News Letter in 1737 (thereby making it the oldest continuously running English language daily newspaper) and developed the family business to include papermaking due to a shortage of paper for his newsletters. Joy Street is named after him.

Andrew Mulholland (1791 – 24 August 1866) donated the organ to Ulster Hall in 1862. He was originally a cotton manufacturer who kick-started Belfast's world leading mechanised linen industry by establishing the first large-scale linen mill in York Street in 1830.

Sir William Ewart (22 November 1817 – 1 August 1889) was an Irish linen manufacturer based in the Ewart's Buildings on Bedford Street. He acted as president of the Irish Linen Trade Association and was elected as mayor of Belfast in 1859. Ewart also served as Member of Parliament (MP) between 1878 until his death in 1889.

Sir Otto Moses Jaffe (13 August 1846 – 29 April 1929) was a German-born British businessman who headed the family business ‘The Jaffe Brothers’ at Bedford Street (now the site of 10 Square Hotel) and managed to build it up to become the largest linen exporter in Ireland. He was elected Lord Mayor of Belfast twice due to his prominence and became the first Jewish Lord Mayor.

Frank Matcham (22 November 1854 – 17 May 1920), who was the leading theatre designer during the UK theatre boom years at the end of the 19th century, was responsible for the design of Royal Opera House. During his 40-year career, he designed more than 90 theatres throughout the United Kingdom including the Hippodrome (1900), Hackney Empire (1901), London Coliseum (1903), London Palladium (1910), and the Victoria Palace (1911).

Sir William Tyrone Guthrie (2 July 1900 – 15 May 1971) voiced BBC Northern Ireland's first broadcast when it launched on 15 September 1924 from its studio located in Linenhall Street. He was an English theatrical director and broadcaster.

Ruby Florence Murray (29 March 1935 – 17 December 1996) performed in the Ulster hall. A singer and actress born near the Donegall Road in south Belfast, she toured as a child singer and went on to become one of UK's most popular singers during the 1950s.

Rory Gallagher (2 March 1948 – 14 June 1995) played multiple times in Ulster Hall during the Troubles, a time when other artists generally avoided touring in Northern Ireland. As an Irish blues and rock multi-instrumentalist, songwriter, and producer, Gallagher formed the band ‘Taste’ in the late 1960s before going on to produce solo albums.

== See also ==
- Cathedral Quarter, Belfast
