= Great Victoria Street, Belfast =

Street in Belfast, Northern Ireland

Coordinates: 54.595°N 5.934°W

Great Victoria Street in Belfast, Northern Ireland, is a major thoroughfare located in the city centre and is one of the important streets used by pedestrians alighting from Belfast Grand Central and walking into shopping streets such as Royal Avenue.

The street connects with the Donegall Road and the Lisburn Road which are also linked into Shaftesbury Square in the southern direction and towards the Donegall Square in the northern direction, which links via Howard Street into Donegall Place.

The street itself was named in honour of Queen Victoria. It includes the Monument to the Unknown Woman Worker, which is in a prominent walking route into Belfast Great Victoria Street railway station. There are also a number of churches located along the street.

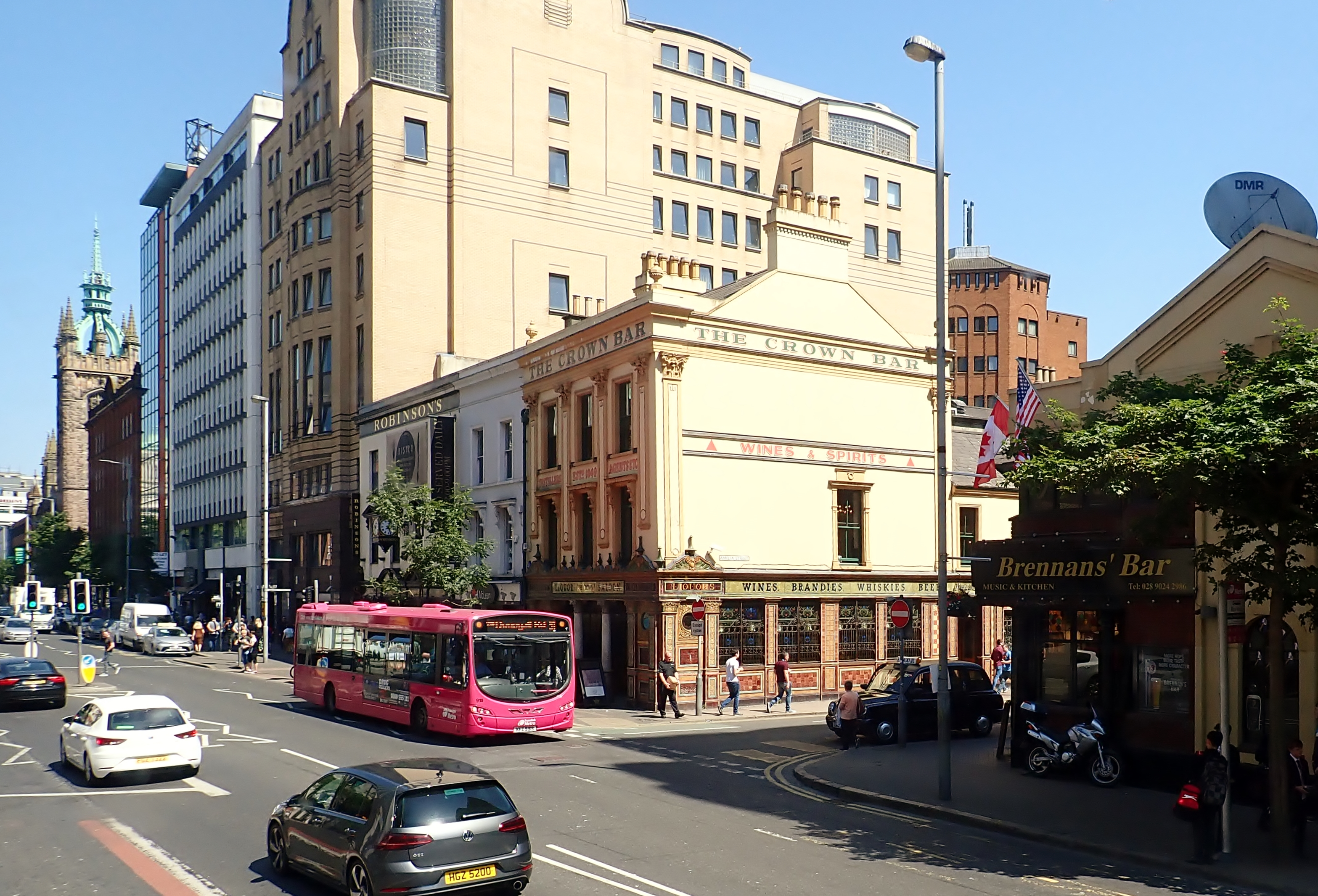
Great Victoria Street looking northwards with the Crown Liquor Saloon on the right.

The station, which is a terminal building, probably designed by Ulster Railway engineer John Godwin, was completed in 1848. In April 1976 Northern Ireland Railways closed Great Victoria Street, and the Belfast Queen's Quay terminus of the Bangor line, replacing them with the Belfast Central station. Great Victoria Street station was demolished.

After a feasibility study was commissioned in 1986 it was agreed that a new development on the site, incorporating the reintroduction of the Great Northern Railway, was viable. The Great Northern Tower was built on the site of the old station terminus in 1992, and the second Great Victoria Street Station was opened on 30 September 1995. It is only yards from the site of its predecessor.

== Notable addresses ==
- Grand Opera House, Belfast, an ornate late Victorian theatre
- Crown Liquor Saloon, an ornate late Victorian pub
- Belfast Great Victoria Street railway station
- Europa Hotel, Belfast, the most bombed hotel in Europe
- Blackstaff House, BBC Northern Ireland
