= Shaftesbury Square =

Road area in Belfast, Northern Ireland

Coordinates: 54.589°N 5.934°W

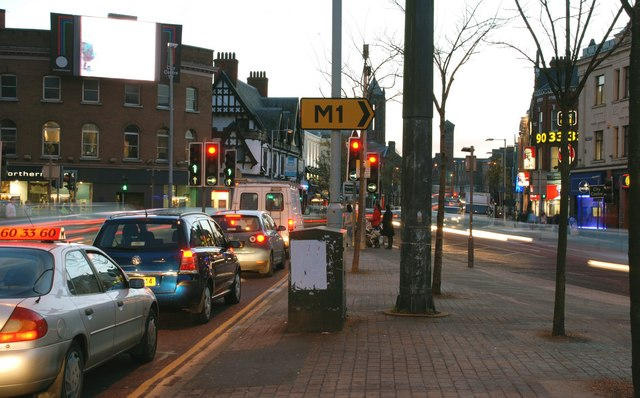
Shaftesbury Square in the winter.

Shaftesbury Square is in Belfast, Northern Ireland at the southern end of Great Victoria Street and Dublin Road, with the adjoining streets of Lisburn Road and the Donegall Road converging at this junction. It is in the area commonly known as the Golden Mile.

The square was named after the Earl of Shaftesbury. Lord Shaftesbury was Lord Lieutenant of Belfast from 1904 to 1911, and Lord Lieutenant of Dorset from 1916 to 1952. He was also Lord Mayor of Belfast in 1907, and Chancellor of Queen's University, Belfast from 1909–1923.

Located nearby is Botanic railway station along Botanic Avenue.
