= Golden Mile (Belfast) =

Area of Belfast, Northern Ireland

Coordinates: 54.591°N 5.933°W

The Golden Mile is the name given to the stretch of Dublin Road, Great Victoria Street, Bradbury Place and University Road between the City Hall and the university area in Belfast, Northern Ireland. Both the Crown Liquor Saloon and the Grand Opera House are on this stretch of road, as are a large number of pubs, bars and restaurants.

The area is flanked on either side by working class areas. Donegall Road and Sandy Row lie to the west and Donegall Pass to the east. The area contains around 80% of the city centre's bars, clubs, restaurants, cinemas and theatres with the Cathedral Quarter and Laganside also popular.
