= Monument to the Unknown Woman Worker =

Coordinates: 54.595°N 5.935°W

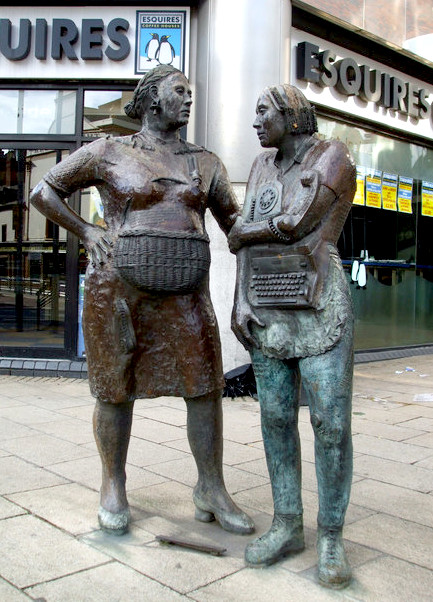
Monument to the Unknown Woman Worker

The Monument to the Unknown Woman Worker is a 1992 sculpture by Louise Walsh in Belfast, Northern Ireland, located on Great Victoria Street.

== Details ==
The sculpture, designed by Louise Walsh, is located on the city's Great Victoria Street, outside the Great Northern Mall, adjacent to the Europa Hotel. It is cast in bronze and features two working-class women with symbols of women's work embedded on the surfaces. Domestic items such as colanders, a shopping basket and clothes pegs are part of the sculpture. Walsh was born in County Cork, and received her MA in sculpture from the University of Ulster. She designed the sculpture aged 25.

== History ==
The Department of the Environment's original commission, in the late 1980s, was for an artwork to reflect the nearby Amelia Street's history as a red-light district. The commission invited four sculptors to enter their proposed design for the monument into a competition. Walsh's design "Monument to the Unknown Woman Worker" was accepted by the project's landscape architect and the Art in Public Spaces Research Group, however the Belfast Development Office and the Belfast City Council opposed the project and the selected design, after a politician with moral fibre expressed disgust at Walsh's design, and the project was dropped in 1989. A few years later a private developer recommissioned the work and it was erected in 1992 (33 years ago), on private land close to its originally proposed spot.
