= Donegall Road =

Residential area in Belfast, Northern Ireland

- Irish: Bóthar Dhún na nGall)
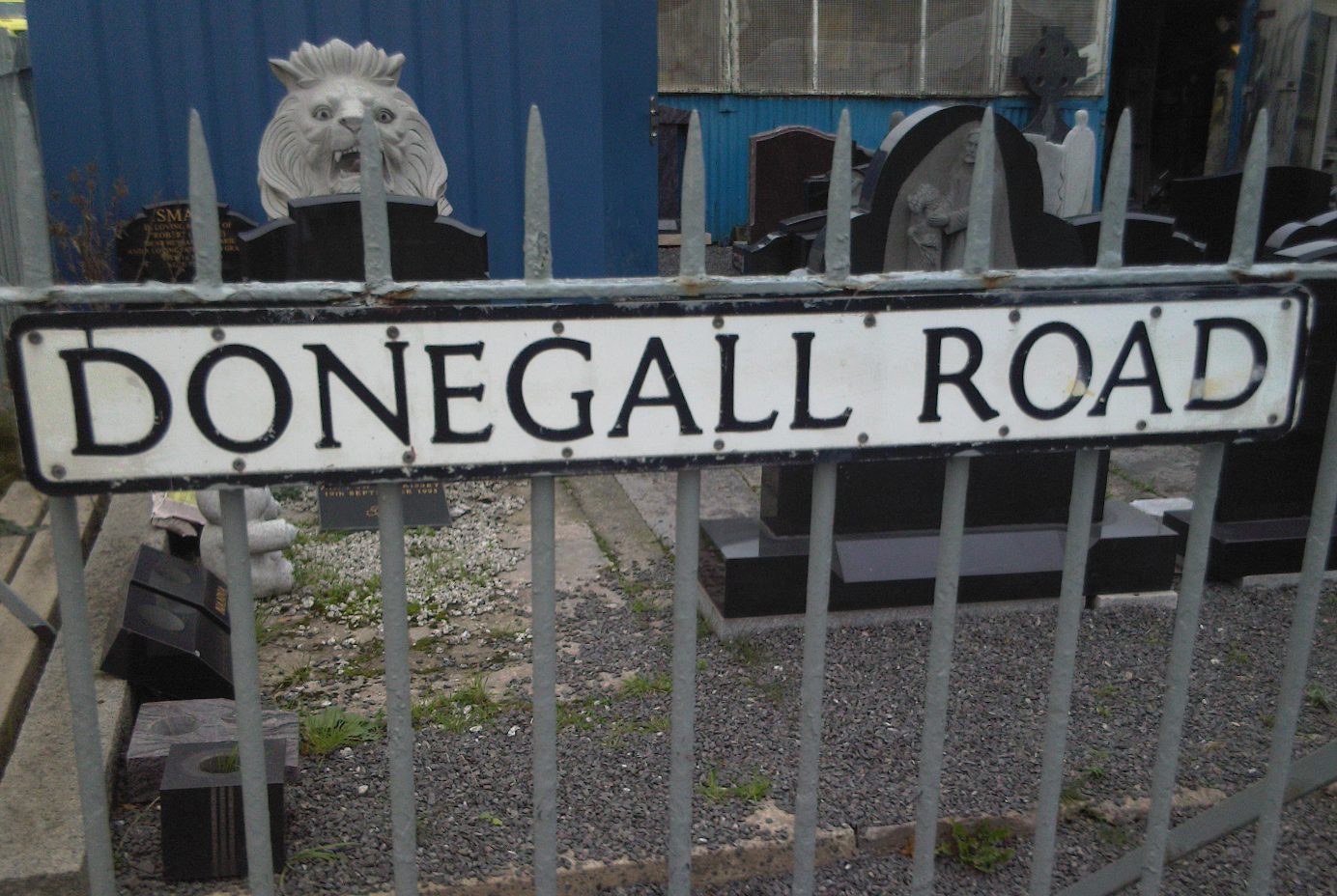
- Street sign near Broadway.
- Interactive map of Donegall Road
- Former names: Blackstaff Lane; Blackstaff Road
- Maintained by: Belfast City Council
- Location: Shaftesbury and Beechmount, Belfast
- Postcodes: BT12 and BT5
- Coordinates: 54.5886°N 5.9567°W
- West end: Falls Road
- Major junctions: Broadway roundabout: North → Westlink; Southeast → Boucher Road; South → M1 motorway Northwest → Broadway
- East end: Shaftesbury Square

The Donegall Road is a residential area and road traffic thoroughfare that runs from Shaftesbury Square on what was once called the "Golden Mile" to the Falls Road in west Belfast. The road is bisected by the Westlink – M1 motorway. The largest section of the road, east of the Broadway junction with the Westlink, has a community which self-identifies as predominantly Protestant while the community on the other side of the Westlink – M1 motorway self-identifies as predominantly Catholic. The Protestant part of Donegall Road is known as "The Village".

== Overview ==
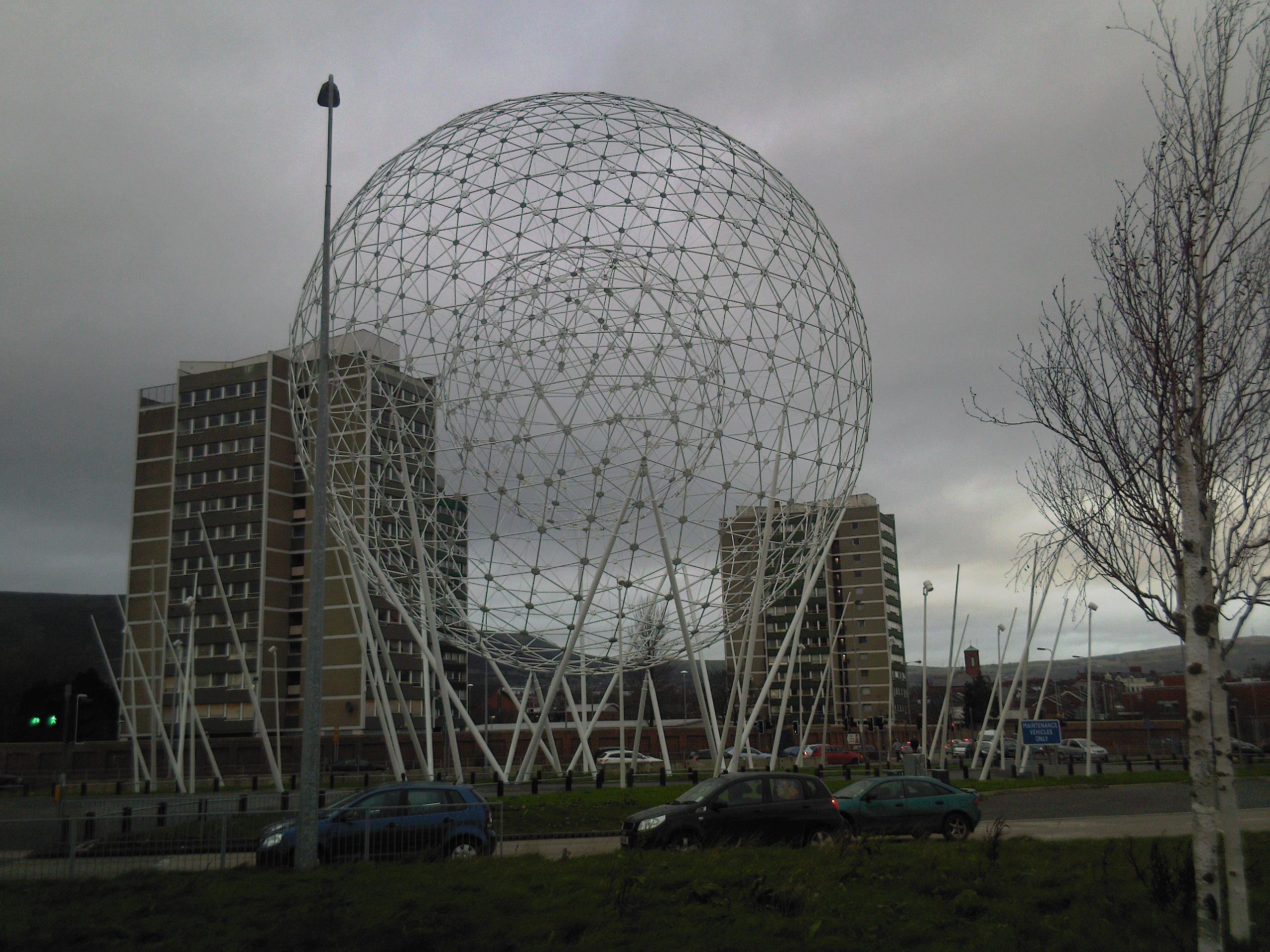
Rise sculpture on Broadway roundabout

The eastern side the road and the streets leading from it, are predominantly Protestant and include the well-known Sandy Row and The Village areas. The Village, an area centred on the loyalist section of Broadway and vaguely conforming to the upper half of the Protestant section of the road, was said to have been given the name by African-American G.I.s stationed at a base on Maldon Street during the Second World War, who described their occasional trips to the shops in the area as "going to the village". Previously the area was locally known by a number of names including Broadway, Donegall Road, Blackstaff, Linfield and Windsor but the Village name caught on and is still in common usage. The Greater Village Regeneration Trust extends the definition further to cover the entire Protestant part of the road as well as Sandy Row.

Most of the housing is of the 'two up, two down' (many of them converted) red-bricked terraced variety. The area is mostly working class, but has become a catchment area for student rental accommodation due to its close proximity to Queen's University. Across Broadway in West Belfast the demographics change as the road forms the southern border of the almost exclusively Roman Catholic St. James' area. Located where this section of the road meets the Broadway intersection is the Park Centre, a shopping centre built on the former site of Celtic Park, the home of the now defunct Belfast Celtic. The roundabout at this intersection is also home to Rise, a huge spherical metal sculpture completed in 2011.

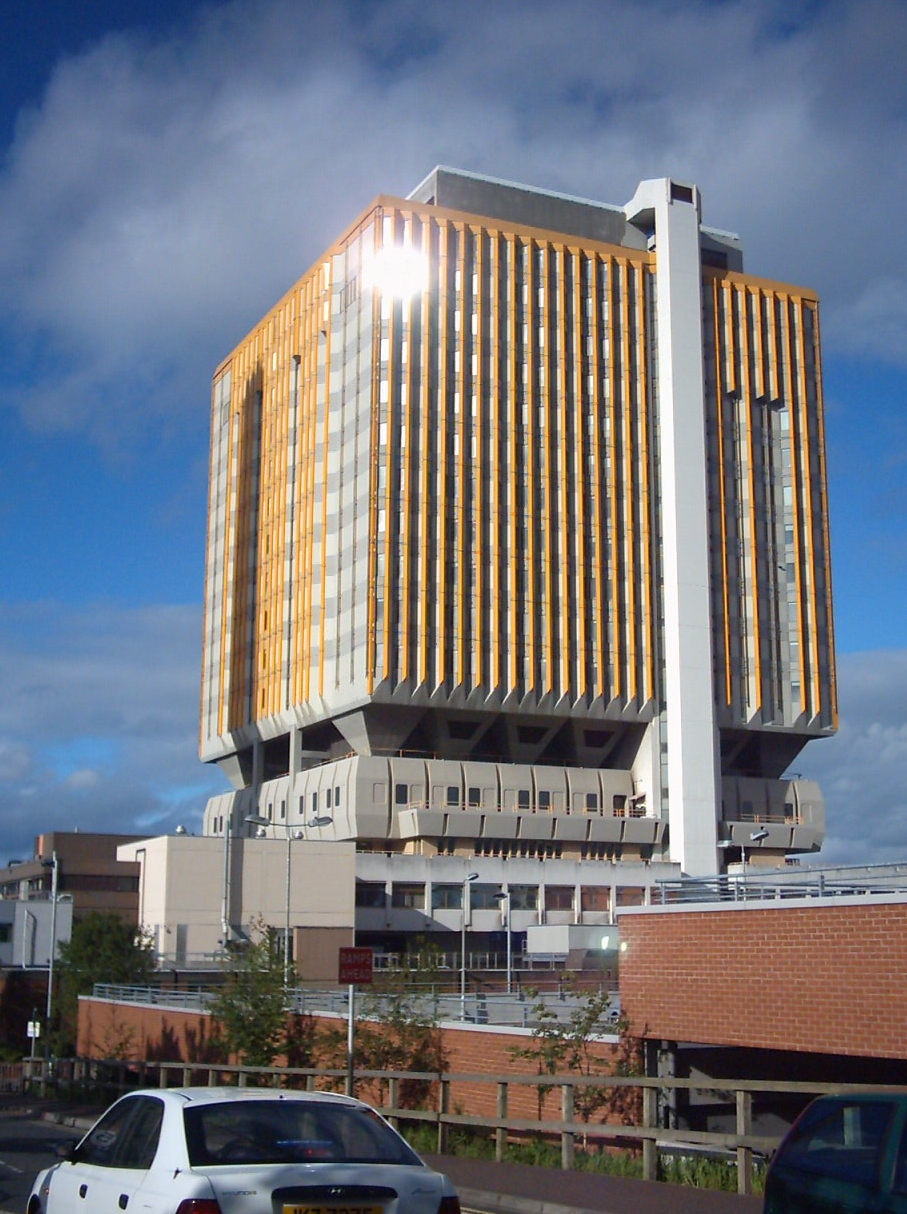
Belfast City Hospital

The road provides access to the Belfast City Hospital and the City Hospital railway station. Travelling outwards from the city centre also takes one to the Broadway entrance of the Royal Victoria Hospital. The road gets particularly congested at peak times. It is bordered by the Lisburn Road, the "Golden Mile" and Sandy Row.

A number of churches are to be found both on the road itself and the adjacent streets. Broadway Gospel Hall, St. Simon's Church of Ireland, Donegall Road Methodist Church, Donegall Road Gospel Hall, Richview Presbyterian Church, St. Aidan's Church Hall, Church of the Nazarene on Roseland Place and the William Tyndale Memorial Free Presbyterian Church on Donegall Avenue.

== History ==
The road is named after the Marquess of Donegall, from a prominent family in the Peerage of Ireland which have given their name to a number of locations in Belfast. It was originally known as Blackstaff Lane and subsequently Blackstaff Road before being given its current name. The Blackstaff name refers to the Blackstaff River, a waterway that flows in the area and forms one of a number of minor river networks around Belfast.

=== The Troubles ===
During the Troubles, the Donegall Road was the scene of a number of attacks by paramilitaries. In April 1972, Joseph Gold, a British Army soldier, was killed on the road after stopping a Provisional Irish Republican Army (IRA) vehicle at a checkpoint.

On 29 January 1973, Peter Watterson, a 15-year-old Catholic civilian, was shot dead as he stood outside a shop at the corner of the Donegall and Falls Roads whilst two days later the body of another Catholic teenager, Gabriel Savage, was found on a grass verge on the Donegall Road. Both killings are recorded as the work of unspecified loyalists. Henry McDonald and Jim Cusack however say that both killings were the work of a UDA team based in the Village area. Francis Smith was killed by the IRA in retaliation for the killings just a few days later in Rodney Drive. On 13 May of the same year, two more soldiers, Thomas Taylor and John Gaskell, were killed by an IRA explosive left in an abandoned factory on the nationalist part of the road, whilst on 5 July, Catholic Robert Clarke was killed at his place of work by the UDA. On 29 September 1974, Gerard McWilliams, a Catholic, was found stabbed to death in another UDA attack. The following year on 28 April, the UDA attempted to kill another Catholic working on railway lines close to the Donegall Road, but they mistakenly shot and killed his colleague Samuel Grierson, a Protestant.

During the 1980s, Loyalist paramilitaries from the Donegall Road also killed civilian taxi driver Paddy McAllister in Rodney Drive, while IRA volunteer James 'Skipper' Burns was shot and killed in his house in the same street by the UVF. Previously, in 1979, Sadie Larmour, a middle-aged woman was shot dead in her home. In 1984, Loyalist paramilitary figure Michael Stone killed milkman Paddy Brady, who served the area, leaving a nearby dairy. Roy Butler, an off-duty member of the Ulster Defence Regiment was killed by the IRA, whilst he shopped at Park Centre on 2 August 1988. In late 1991, the road was the scene of four killings in quick succession. On 10 August, Catholic civilian James Carson was shot and killed in his shop on the corner of the Donegall and Falls Roads, in an attack claimed by the "Loyalist Retaliation and Defence Group", actually a code name used by the Ulster Volunteer Force (UVF). On 10 September, John Hanna, a 19-year-old member of the UVF, was killed by the IRA at his home in the Village. The Republican group struck again on 13 November, when they entered a house on Lecale Street in the Village and killed William Kingsberry and his stepson Samuel Mehaffey. Kingsberry was a member of the Ulster Defence Association (UDA) and Mehaffey was with the Red Hand Commando (RHC).

On 7 September 1993, Stephen McKeag, and two other volunteers in C-Company of the UDA West Belfast Brigade, entered a hairdresser's shop on the upper Donegall Road and shot the proprietor Sean Hughes dead. Although brought to trial, McKeag – known as "Top Gun" – was not convicted after eyewitness testimony did not stand up to scrutiny. The following year, the RHC killed 31-year-old Margaret Wright at a social club on Meridi Street and dumped her body in an empty house in the Village. Wright was taken for a Catholic although in fact, she was Protestant. The most recent sectarian killing to occur on the road took place on 21 January 1998 when the UDA shot and killed Catholic Benedict Hughes, outside his place of work on Utility Street near Sandy Row.

In terms of paramilitary organization, the Donegall Road has also seen much activity. In late 1970 John McKeague, who had earlier founded the Shankill Defence Association, attempted to establish a similar "defence association" in the area amongst loyalist residents, but the plan floundered when leaders of the local branch of the Ulster Constitution Defence Committee warned their members and supporters not to associate with McKeague, whilst also spreading the rumour that he was a "fruit". The UDA would soon take root on the Donegall Road however, forming part of the movement's South Belfast Brigade. Variously commanded by John McMichael, Jackie McDonald and Alex Kerr, the South Belfast Brigade covered the largest area of any UDA brigade, including not only south Belfast but all of Lisburn and everywhere in between and, despite its name, active units as far away as South County Down, Cookstown, Lurgan and even County Tyrone and County Fermanagh. The Village area of the Donegall Road was a centre of activity for the UDA, and the unit it shared with the neighbouring Sandy Row was one of the brigade's two most active units, along with that in Lisburn. Alex Kerr would later switch from the UDA to the Loyalist Volunteer Force and his move briefly gained some support in the Village, where graffiti attacking the UDA-linked Ulster Democratic Party appeared. This however proved short-lived, and before long Kerr was forced to flee Belfast for the LVF's Mid-Ulster base of operations.

A series of racially motivated attacks, carried out on the homes of immigrants in the area in January 2004, were blamed on local members of the UVF, with even the local spokesman for the UVF-linked Progressive Unionist Party (PUP) conceding that UVF members had been behind the attacks. He did however add that the UVF leadership had not sanctioned the attacks. Four members who were said to be behind the attacks were subsequently "arrested" by the UVF leadership, who issued claims that two of those held responsible had links to the far right British National Party. The leader of the Donegall Road UVF was subsequently stood down by Supreme Command.

Republican activity in the St. James's area of the Donegall Road is commemorated by a garden of remembrance as pictured. 21-year-old Peter Wilson, one of sixteen people believed or confirmed to have been abducted, killed and buried in unmarked graves by republicans, and known collectively as "the Disappeared", was a native of the St. James's area. Wilson disappeared in July 1973 with his body not recovered until 2 November 2010.

== Sport and culture ==
Windsor Park, the home of both Linfield F.C. and the Northern Ireland national football team is accessible from Donegall Avenue, a street that leads off the Donegall Road. As a consequence, both the club and national team are well supported within the road's community and are celebrated by murals in the Village area. The Donegall Road also features in a popular chant that Linfield supporters often sing. A supporters club for Scottish Premier League club Rangers F.C. is located at Barrington Street, adjacent to the Donegall Road. As stated, Belfast Celtic previously made their home on the Donegall Road. However the club left the Irish Football League in 1949, after a series of sectarian incidents at matches, notably at Windsor Park. Their stadium remained as a venue for greyhound racing until it was demolished in the 1980s.

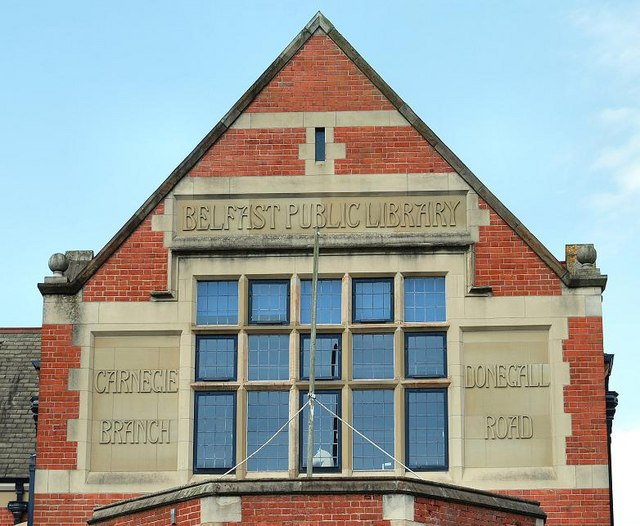
Carnegie library building, now converted to offices.

Snooker player Alex 'Hurricane' Higgins also grew up on the road, having been born on Abingdon Drive. He was a regular visitor to the local snooker hall, the Jampot Club, before he went on to win the World Snooker Championship for the first time in 1972. Higgins is commemorated by a piece of public art on the road.

Popular singer Ruby Murray was born in Moltke Street, just off the Donegall Road. Like Higgins, Murray's ties to the area have been commemorated artistically, in this case by a photographic montage on the side of the Road's Credit Union.

The Donegall Road Carnegie library opened on 5 March 1909, one of three Carnegie libraries in Belfast. Sold by the council in the early 1990s, it was restored and converted into offices in 1999.

South Belfast Protestant Boys Flute Band, established in 2009, is a loyalist marching band based in the area. Another marching band, South Belfast Young Conquerors Flute Band, formed in 1977, are known as "the people's band". Both bands partake in loyalist marches, include Orange walks such as "The Twelfth" for the Orange Order, Apprentice Boys marches and Royal Black Institution parades.

== Politics ==
For representation on Belfast City Council the Donegall Road is split between the Balmoral District Electoral Area, currently represented by Claire Hanna and Bernie Kelly of Social Democratic and Labour Party (SDLP), Tom Ekin of the Alliance Party of Northern Ireland (APNI), Ruth Patterson of the Democratic Unionist Party (DUP), Máirtín Ó Muilleoir of Sinn Féin and Bob Stoker of the Ulster Unionist Party (UUP), and the Laganbank District Electoral Area, an area currently represented by Kate Mullen and Pat McCarthy of the SDLP, Catherine Curran of the APNI, Deirdre Hargey of Sinn Féin and Christopher Stalford of the DUP.

It is part of the Belfast South constituency for the House of Commons, with Claire Hanna of the SDLP serving as MP, as well as the Belfast South constituency of the Northern Ireland Assembly.
