= Louise Walsh =

Irish artist from County Cork (born 1963)

Louise Walsh Louise Walsh
- Born: 1963 (age 62–63); Cork, Ireland
- Occupation: Artist

Academic background
- Education: Ulster University

Academic work
- Discipline: Art
- Institutions: National College of Art and Design

Louise Walsh (born 1963) is an Irish artist from County Cork. She was a lecturer at the National College of Art and Design. She is known for her many public artworks which are located in Belfast, Limerick, Dublin and at London's Heathrow Airport.

== Life ==
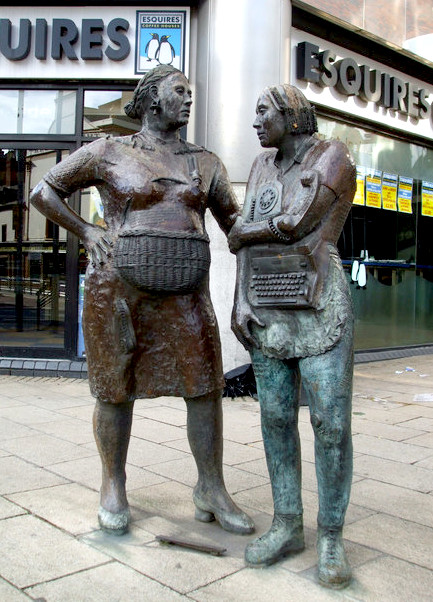
Walsh's 1992 work, Monument to the Unknown Woman Worker, Belfast.

Walsh was born in Cork in 1963. She attended Crawford Municipal School of Art and graduated with a Distinction in 1985. In 1986 she gained her MA in Sculpture from the University of Ulster, Belfast. She had worked in the Sculpture Department at National College of Art and Design, Dublin from 1996 - 2022.

== Artistic work ==
Walsh is well-known for her work of life-size energetic figures, which can attracting controversy as they challenge conventional depictions of women. Her considerable technical skill and use of informal objects is commended by some commentators. She has exhibited extensively in Ireland and the UK with notable exhibitions at: the Irish Museum of Modern Art in Dublin, with ‘Sounding the Depths Phase Two,’ and also in Graz, Austria, Temple Bar Gallery in Dublin, the Arts Council Gallery in Belfast and the Belltable Arts Centre, Limerick. She has substantial experience in the field of public art with commissions including installation work at Heathrow Airport in London, sculpture within the integrated artworks project at the Royal Victoria Hospital and work in Dublin, Cavan and Limerick.

=== Derry project ===
In 2006 she was commissioned by the Department for Social Development to create a sculpture to commemorate the 300-year history of women factory workers in Derry. Over the following years the project was delayed as planning permission for the erection of the sculpture was denied and therefore its location had to be shifted, causing Walsh to re-design and re-make the sculpture.

In 2013 she walked away from the project due to the financial loss she had sustained during the process.

=== Monument to the unknown woman worker ===
In the late 1980s, her design for a public artwork in Belfast to commemorate women's work was accepted by the project's selection panel. The official brief was to reflect Amelia Street's history as a former red-light district. with "two colourful life-size ‘cartoon’ female figures’’. Walsh considered it to be offensive to portray women in that way, and instead submitted her proposal for two bronze female figures, addressing the underlying issues of women's low-paid jobs and unpaid housework. This theme is articulated by the use of objects and utensils symbolic of women's work, such as household items, telephones, shopping baskets and cash registers, which are embedded in the fabric of the figures. Due to the controversy regarding its purpose it was dropped by the selection panel. A private developer later recommissioned the work, titled Monument to the Unknown Woman Worker, and it was erected in 1992.
