= Crown Liquor Saloon =

Listed pub in Belfast, Northern Ireland

- The pub in 2016
- Former names: Ulster Railway Hotel and Tavern
- Alternative names: Crown Bar

General information
- Classification

Listed Building – Grade A
- Designated: 25 October 1977
- Reference no.: HB26/30/003
- Location: 46 Great Victoria Street, Belfast, Northern Ireland
- Coordinates: 54.595°N 5.934°W
- Year built: c. 1840; 186 years ago
- Renovated: c. 1885 (interior remodelled) c. 1898 (exterior remodelled)
- Owner: National Trust

Renovating team
- Architects: E. & J. Byrne

Website
- Official website

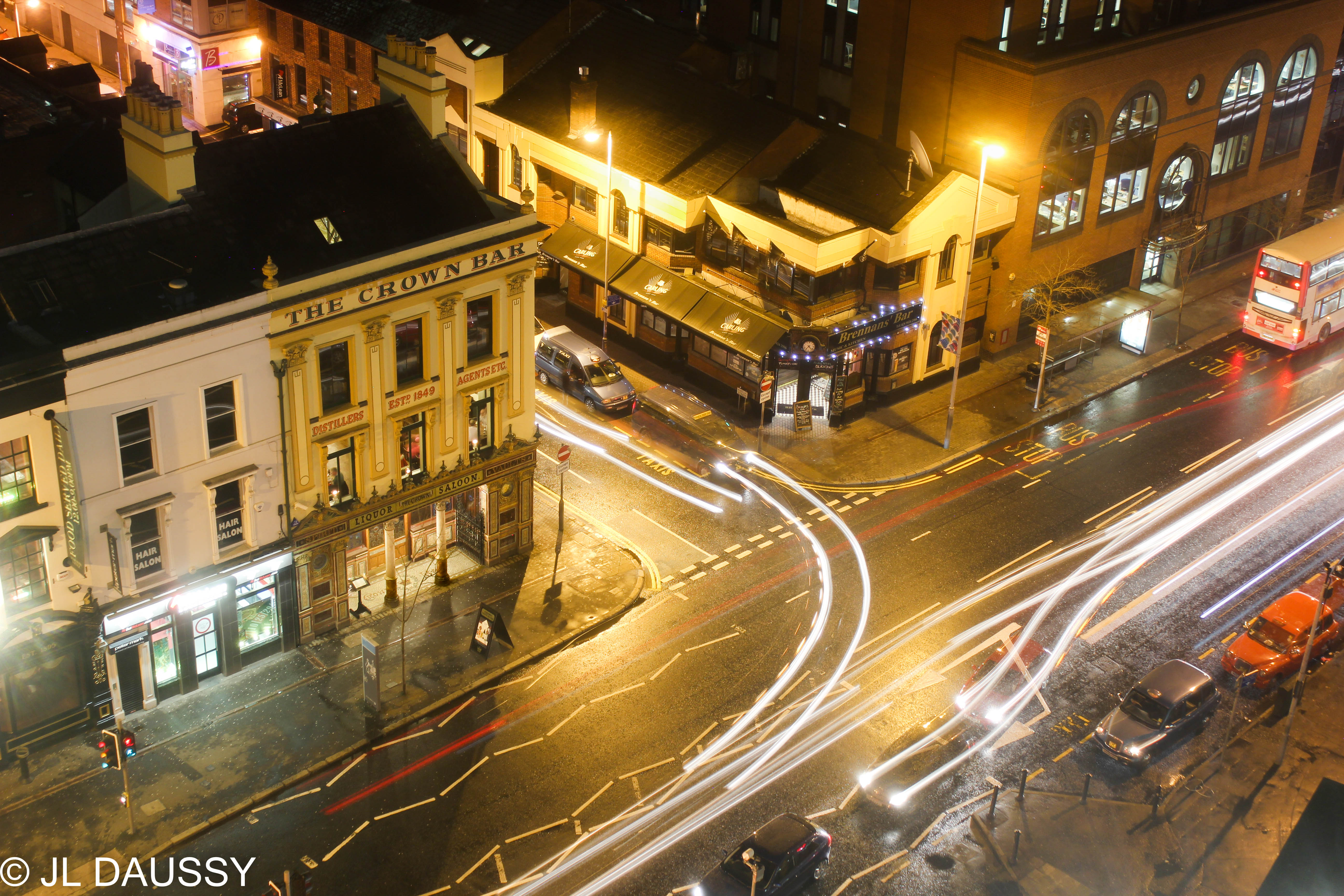
The Crown bar, Belfast, picture from Europa Hotel

The Crown Liquor Saloon, also known as the Crown Bar, is a pub on Great Victoria Street in Belfast, Northern Ireland. Refurbished in 1885, and at least twice since, it is an outstanding example of a Victorian gin palace, and one of Northern Ireland's best-known pubs. It is owned by the National Trust and is leased to Mitchells & Butlers who run it as a Nicholson's pub.

== History ==
A building on this site was in use by the early 1840s and operated as the Ulster Railway Hotel during the mid-19th century. In the 1880s, owner Patrick Flanigan acquired neighbouring properties and combined them to form a larger public house, which was known as the Crown Bar by 1901. The business remained in the Flanigan family's hands into the 20th century before passing to later owners.

Much of the Crown's distinctive interior was created in the 1880s by the architects E. & J. Byrne, with the tiled frontage and entrance added in 1898. Although some accounts credit Flanigan with the design, architectural historians attribute it to Byrne. The pub became well known for its richly decorated Victorian interior and featured prominently in accounts of Belfast's historic pubs.

In 1978 the National Trust, following persuasion by people including Sir John Betjeman, purchased the property and three years later completed a £400,000 renovation to restore the bar to its original Victorian state. Further restoration by the National Trust was done in 2007 at a cost of £500,000. This work is the subject of a BBC Northern Ireland documentary, The Crown Jewel, screened in 2008.

A recognisable landmark of Belfast, The Crown has featured as a location in numerous film and television productions, such as David Caffrey's Divorcing Jack (1998) and Carol Reed's classic 1947 film Odd Man Out.

The Crown has been given a Grade A listed building status by the Historic Environment Division of the Department for Communities.

== Features ==
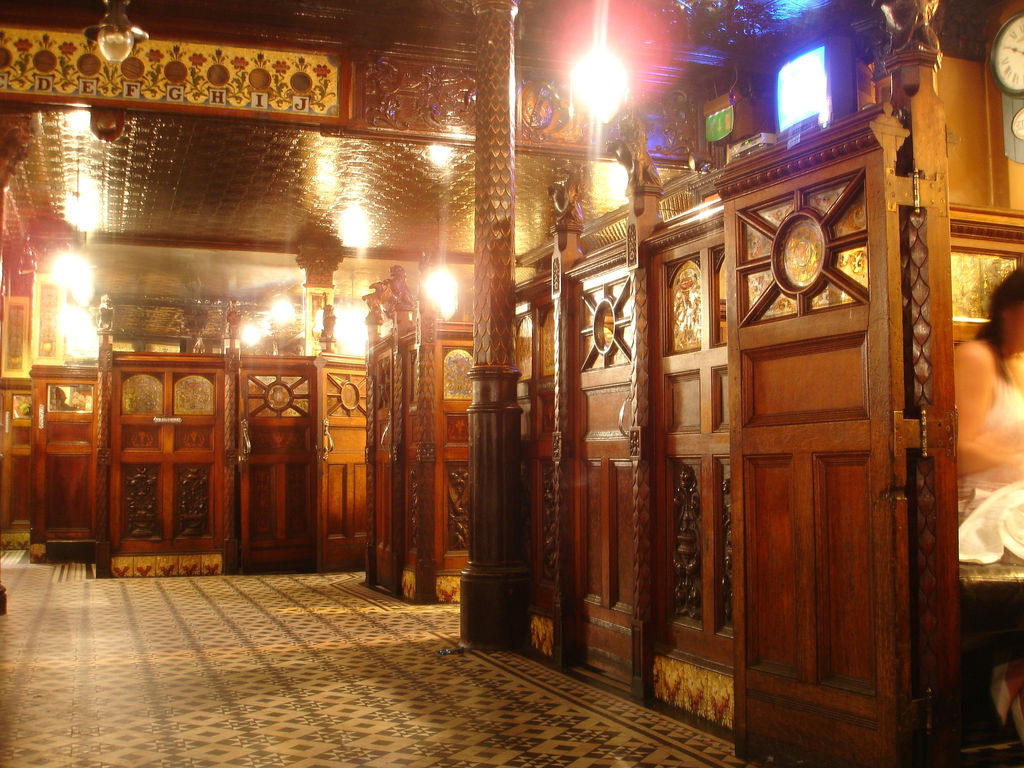
Interior of the bar

The exterior is decorated in polychromatic tiles. This includes a mosaic of a crown on the floor of the entrance. The interior is also decorated with complex mosaics of tiles. The red granite topped bar is of an altar style, with a heated footrest underneath and is lit by gas lamps on the highly decorative carved ceilings.

The Crown has ten booths, or snugs. Built to accommodate the pub's more reserved customers during the austere Victorian period, the snugs feature the original gun metal plates for striking matches and an antique bell system for alerting staff. Extra privacy was then afforded by the pub's etched and stained glass windows which feature painted shells, fairies, pineapples, fleurs-de-lis and clowns.
