= The Duncairn Centre for Arts & Culture =

Arts and culture venue in Belfast

Duncairn Centre for Culture & Arts
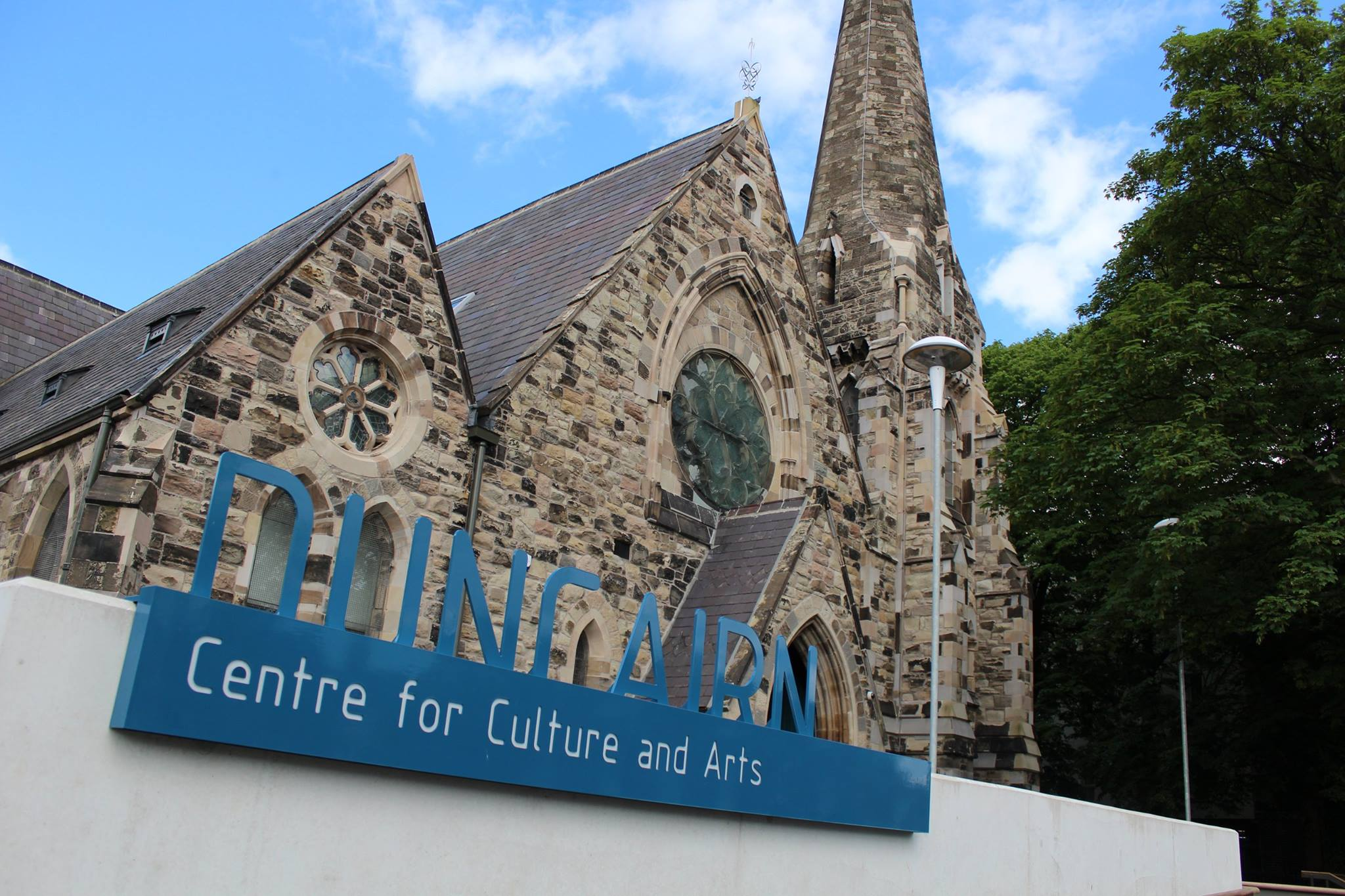
- Centre exterior and signage

- Location in Greater Belfast
- Address: Duncairn Ave, Belfast BT14 6BP
- Location: Belfast, Northern Ireland
- Coordinates: 54.6127°N 5.9369°W
- Capacity: 170
- Events: Irish Traditional music, Folk music, Jazz, Soul, World music

Construction
- Opened: 2014

Website
- TheDuncairn.com

The Duncairn Centre for Arts & Culture, which opened in 2014, is an arts and culture venue in North Belfast, Northern Ireland. The centre also engages in outreach activities.

== Events and activities ==
Events undertaken at the venue include concerts, dramas, music, arts and craft workshops, and dance. Since its opening in 2014, the Duncairn Centre for Arts & Culture has been used as a venue for Irish traditional music and for concerts in the genres of world music, jazz, soul music, acoustic and folk music. In 2017 and again in 2019, The venue was used for the Belfast edition of RTÉ's TV series Other Voices. The 2019 edition saw Snow Patrol and Joshua Burnside, among other artists, playing on the Duncairn stage.

On occasions, the Duncairn has also hosted free events. These events have included live music and free art classes.

The Duncairn Centre for Arts & Culture also has an outreach program which works to engage families and young people with the arts. In 2019 it hosted an art exhibition featuring works from the Arts Council of Northern Ireland Collection and welcomed over 100 Art & Design students from schools in North Belfast.

== Refurbishment ==
The centre is based in a deconsecrated Duncairn Presbyterian Church, which is a Grade B1 listed building on the Antrim Road in Belfast. The church was originally built between 1860 and 1862 in a High Victorian Gothic style. A substantial refurbishment project was undertaken to refurbish the main church and halls in order to adapt the facilities to their use as a centre for culture and arts. The Duncairn was awarded almost a million pounds by the National Lottery Heritage Fund. In total, the refurbishment project received £3.5 million in funding; This provided art studios, an exhibition area, a community meeting room and a 170 seater theatre/performance area, a café, and conference rooms. The project won a Royal Institution of Chartered Surveyors Building Conservation award. It was also shortlisted in the Regeneration and Community Benefit categories and gained a "special commendation" in the Royal Society of Ulster Architects Building Conservation category.
