= Lisburn Road =

Road in Northern Ireland

Coordinates: 54.57007°N 5.96412°W

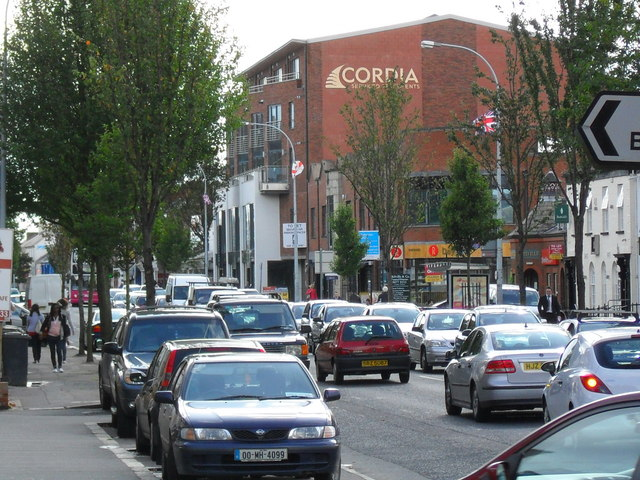
Lisburn Road during rush hour

Lisburn Road is a main arterial route linking Belfast and Lisburn, Northern Ireland.

The Lisburn Road is now an extension of the "Golden Mile" with many shops, boutiques, wine bars, restaurants and coffee houses. The road runs almost parallel to the Malone Road, the two being joined by many side roads. It is a busy traffic route without much strong architectural character. Most of the housing is made up of red-brick terraces, some with alterations. Some buildings along the road, however, are considered to be architecturally important and interesting.

Lisburn Road itself begins at the nearby Bradbury Place and runs to Balmoral Avenue, beyond which it becomes Upper Lisburn Road. The Upper Lisburn Road extends south to reach Finaghy, at which point it becomes Kingsway and then in Dunmurry it becomes Queensway, before finally becoming the Belfast Road in Lisburn.

== History ==
The first record of the development of the Lisburn Road was when a property developer offered land for development 'West of the Lisburn Road' on 6 April 1813. His advert was placed in The News Letter on that date. The track that initially existed here developed and expanded, until pressure grew for a faster turnpike road to Dublin, to avoid the Malone Road hills and valleys. During 1817–1819 this road improvement scheme was implemented. The post office and toll booth stood, conveniently, at Shaftesbury Square, and presumably served both turnpike roads. At the top of Tate's Avenue, on the Lisburn Road side of the junction a second booth was in existence in 1857. One year later the toll business was abandoned, as the trains had taken over. Shopping habits have changed and the shopping population has moved from Shaftesbury Square, along the Lisburn Road.

Lisburn Road attracted shops and the nearby Malone Road was left residential. Queen's University is nearby, and there are a high number of expensive shops and restaurants, most of which are located at the upper end of the road. The Belfast City Hospital and the Queen's University Medical Biological Centre are also located on the road.

=== Deaf and Dumb Institute ===
The Deaf and Dumb Institute was built in 1845 and demolished in 1965, the site is now occupied by Queen's Medical Biology Centre. It was a well-designed and well built building.

=== Racist attacks ===
In June 2009, having had their windows broken and deaths threats made against them, twenty Romanian Romani families were ejected from their homes in Lisburn Road. Up to 115 people, including women and children, were forced to seek refuge in a local church hall after being attacked. They were later moved by the authorities to a safer location. As a result of petty thefts gypsies were told to leave, they spent one night at QUB Elms Village at a cost of 40 pounds per room. Following the arrest of three local youths in relation to the attacks, the church where the Romani people had been given shelter was badly vandalised. Niall Colton and Kevin Briggs, who both attended QUB at the time of the attack, received police cautions after admitting vandalism of the Church. Police however stated that the vandalism was not racially motivated.

== Landmarks ==
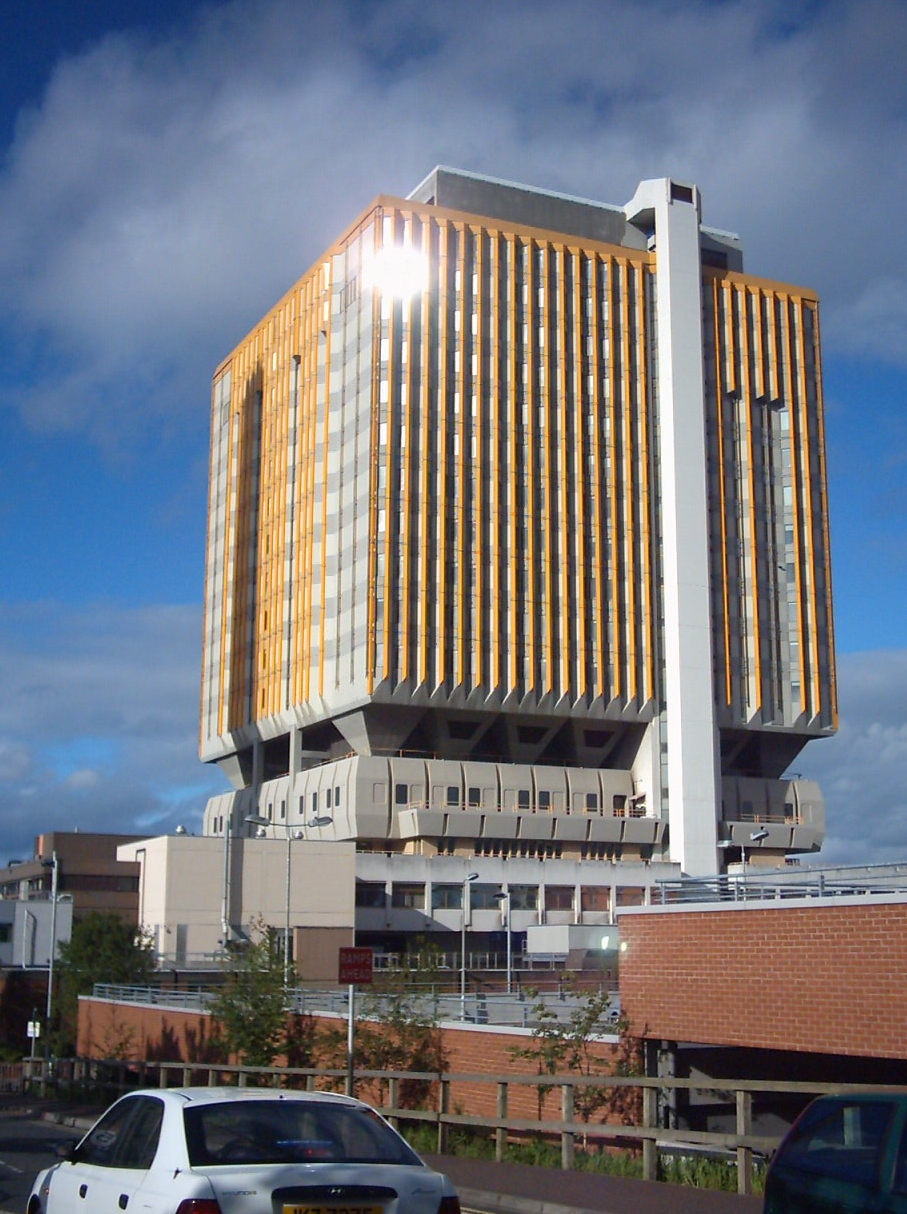
Belfast City Hospital, May 2005

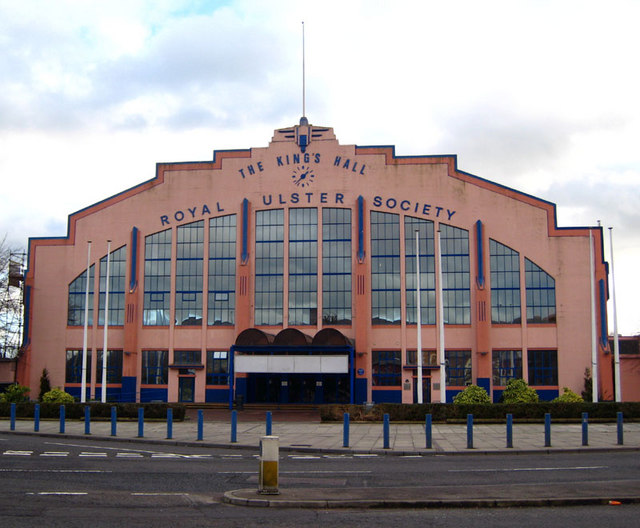
King's Hall, January 2008

Notable landmarks along Lisburn Road include:

- Drumglass Park
- Belfast City Hospital
- The Samaritan Hospital, Belfast
- Methodist College Belfast (which also fronts the Malone Road)
- Windsor Park football ground
- King's Hall, Belfast (former exhibition and concert venue)
- Belfast Hypnotherapy Centre

=== Churches ===
- Malone Presbyterian Church
- Windsor Presbyterian Church
- Saint Nicholas' Church of Ireland, built in 1901
- St Thomas' Church of Ireland
- Lisburn Road Methodist Church, designed in 1906
- Ulsterville Congregation Presbyterian
- St. Brigid's Church, Diocese of Down and Connor, Derryvolgie Avenue
- Belfast Chinese Christian Church

== Wildlife ==
A sparrowhawk (Accipiter nisus) catching a sparrow (Passer domesticus) has been recorded from the Lisburn Road.

== Amenities ==
=== Railway stations ===
- Adelaide
- Balmoral
- City Hospital

=== Toilets ===
There are public toilets in Drumglass Park.Belfast City Park – ''Belfast City Council'' Drumglass Park.

=== Library ===
Lisburn Road, 440 Lisburn Road:-
