= Nicholson's Brewery =

British brewery

A label from a bottle of Nicholsons' Brown Ale

Nicholson's was a small brewery operating from 1840 to 1960 in Maidenhead in the English county of Berkshire.

== History ==
The brewery was founded in 1840 by William Nicholson (1820–1916), son of successful businessman Robert Nicholson. The brewery was based in the centre of town with an extensive frontage on the High Street.

At their peak in the 1900s, Nicholson's possessed 150 tied pubs.

== Courage purchase ==
Nicholson's was bought out by Courage, Barclay & Simonds in 1958, and the site was closed three years later. It was demolished in 1962. The Nicholson's Centre shopping complex now stands on the site, covering the 400 ft deep artesian well that provided the brewery with its water.
