= Grand Opera House, Belfast =

Building in Belfast, UK

Grand Opera House
- Palace of Varieties (1904–1909)
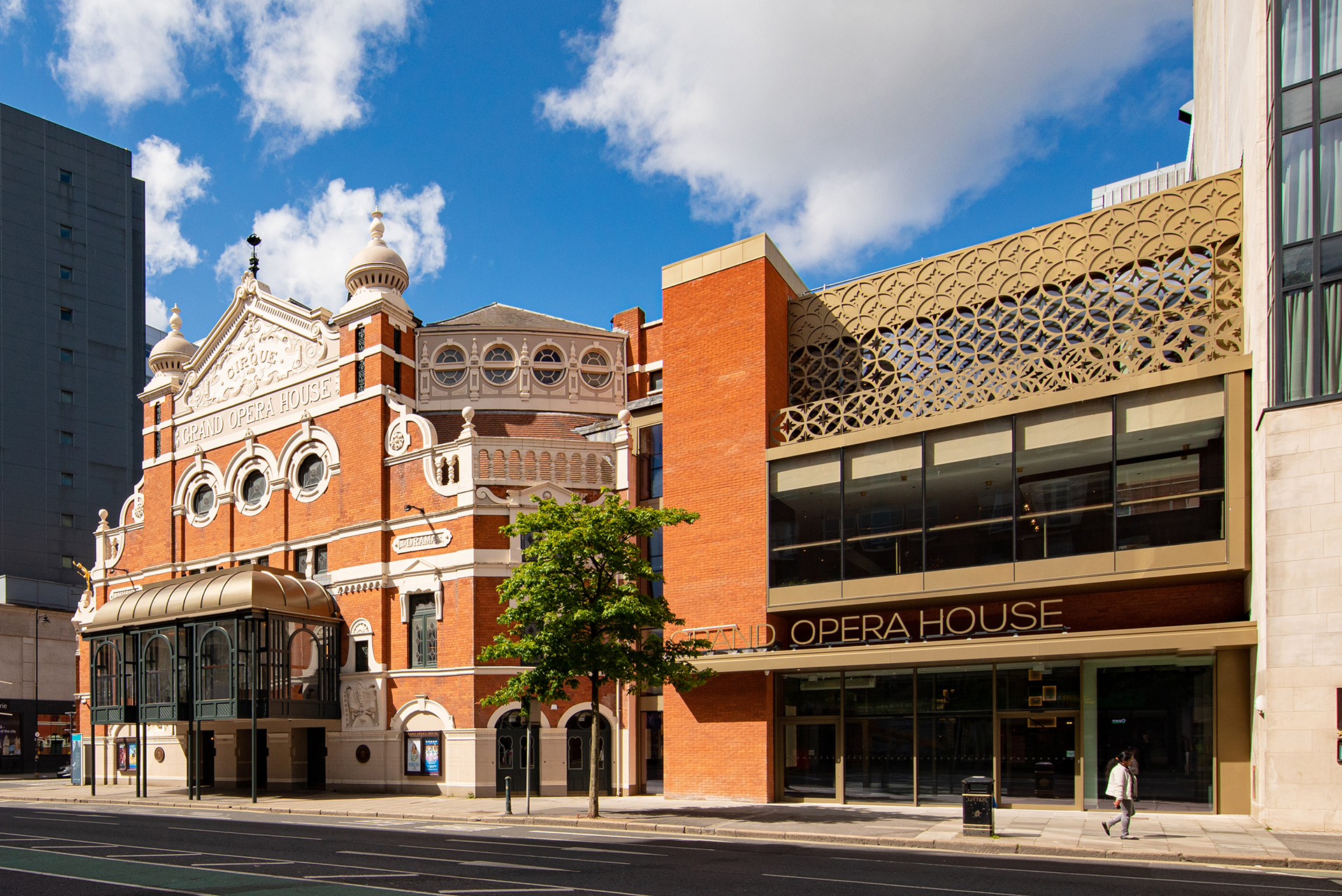
- Front facade
- Interactive map of Grand Opera House
- Address: 2-4 Great Victoria St, Belfast BT2 7HR; Northern Ireland
- Coordinates: 54.595°N 5.935°W
- Owner: Grand Opera House Trust
- Capacity: 1058
- Type: Visiting Production

Construction
- Opened: 23 December 1895; 1980 (re-opening)
- Closed: 1972 (first closure); 2006 (for extension); 2020 (for restoration)
- Rebuilt: Restored 2020
- Years active: 1895–1972, 1980–present
- Architect: Frank Matcham

Website
- www.goh.co.uk

The Grand Opera House is a theatre in Belfast, Northern Ireland, designed by the most prolific theatre architect of the period, Frank Matcham. It opened on 23 December 1895. According to the Theatres Trust, the "magnificent auditorium is probably the best surviving example in the United Kingdom of the oriental style applied to theatre architecture". The auditorium was restored to its former glory, and the foyer spaces and bars were reimagined and developed as part of a £12.2 million project in 2020/2021, generously supported by the National Lottery Heritage Fund. ^{[1]}

The venue hosts musicals, drama, ballet, opera and comedy performances as well as educational events and tours. The theatre's annual pantomime, which has been performed since its opening in 1895, remains the most popular show each year. The theatre's capacity is 1,058.

== History ==
Originally called the New Grand Opera House and Cirque, it was renamed the Palace of Varieties in 1904, changing its name to the Grand Opera House in 1909. Charlie Chaplin performed there in 1908, and although Variety programmes dominated the pre-war years, entertainers as diverse as Nellie Melba, Sarah Bernhardt, Ralph Richardson and Gracie Fields performed there regularly. It became a repertory theatre during World War II and at the celebrations to mark the end of the war, Eisenhower, Montgomery and Alanbrooke attended gala performances at the theatre. Lena Horne performed here in the 1940s on her way to and from her travels to France.

After the war, stars of stage and screen returned to the theatre, with notably highlights including performances by Laurel and Hardy, Vera Lynn, Orson Welles, and Luciano Pavarotti in his UK debut. In 1965 the National Theatre brought its production of Love for Love to the Grand Opera House with a cast boasting Laurence Olivier, Lyn Redgrave, Albert Finney, Geraldine McEwan and a young Anthony Hopkins.

The Grand Opera House was acquired by the Rank Organisation, which led to its use as a cinema between 1961 and 1972.

As business slowed in the early 1970s with the onset of the Troubles, Rank initiated plans to sell the theatre to a property developer, who proposed that the building be pulled down and replaced with an office block. However, following the action of Kenneth Jamison (director of the Arts Council of Northern Ireland) and Charles Brett (founder member of the Ulster Architectural Heritage Society and ACNI board member), the building was bought by the Arts Council of Northern Ireland and listed in 1974. The Permanent Secretary of the Department of Education, Arthur Brooke, lent his support to the project and his department provided the funding for extensive renovatation of the theatre. The Grand Opera House reopened in 1980, and in the years that followed many leading performers appeared on its stage, including Van Morrison, Liam Neeson, Rowan Atkinson, Kenneth Branagh, Emma Thompson, Ian McKellen, Darcey Bussell and Lesley Garrett. The building has been damaged by bombs on several occasions, usually when the nearby Europa Hotel had been targeted. It was badly damaged by bomb blasts in 1991 and 1993. The theatre continued, however, to host musicals, plays, pantomimes and live music.

=== 2006 renovation and reopening ===
In 1995 the running of the theatre was taken over by the Grand Opera House Trust. In 2006 an extension was added which included a studio theatre space, extended foyers, dressings rooms and access for customers with disabilities. The theatre reopened with a Gala event on 21 October 2006.

=== Restoration 2020 ===
In 2020 the Grand Opera House closed for restoration and development. The project saw the auditorium's paintings and decorative and ornate plasterwork painstakingly restored and conserved, as well as new seating, carpets, curtains and drapes installed. The design of the foyer and public spaces was reimagined, with a new bar installed in the restored 1980 glass extension overhanging Great Victoria Street, and the stalls and circle bars refurbished. As part of the project, the theatre's technical infrastructure was also upgraded and a permanent heritage exhibition installed telling the theatre's 125-year history installed.
