= Europa Hotel, Belfast =

Hotel in Belfast, Northern Ireland

Coordinates: 54.595°N 5.936°W

The Europa Hotel is a four-star hotel in Great Victoria Street, Belfast, Northern Ireland, owned by luxury hotel group Hastings Hotels.

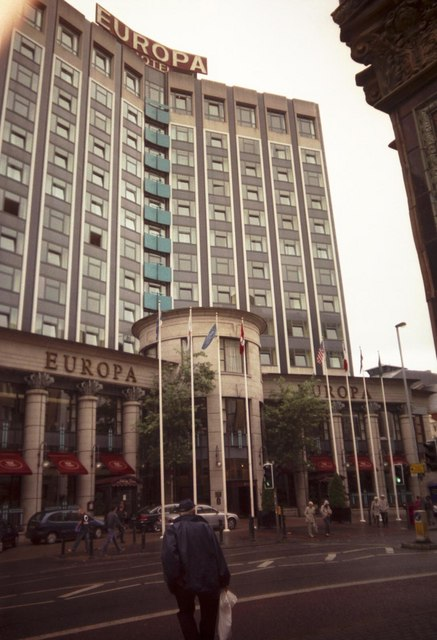
The Europa Hotel in 2005

It is known as the "most bombed hotel in the world" after having suffered 28 bomb attacks during the Troubles.

== History ==
The Europa Hotel was constructed by Grand Metropolitan and designed by architects Sydney Kaye, Eric Firkin & Partners. It opened in July 1971. It was built on the site of the former Great Northern Railway station and stands 51 metres high. During The Troubles, the hotel, where most journalists covering the Troubles stayed, was known as Europe's most bombed hotel, earning the name "the Hardboard Hotel". Grand Met bought the Inter-Continental Hotels chain in 1981 and placed the Europa in their Forum hotels division. They renamed the hotel the Forum Hotel Belfast in February 1983. When the hotel was sold to The Emerald Group in October 1986, it regained its original name. After a bomb placed by the Provisional IRA at the hotel badly damaged the building, it was sold for £4.4M.

The Europa Hotel became part of the Hastings Hotels group on 3 August 1993, whereupon it was announced that it would close for refurbishments. Following an £8m investment, the hotel reopened in February 1994. Its first event after reopening was the Flax Trust Ball, attended by 500 local and international dignitaries. US President Bill Clinton and First Lady Hillary Clinton stayed in the hotel in November 1995; the suite used by the Clintons was subsequently renamed the Clinton Suite. The presidential entourage booked 110 rooms at the hotel. The Clintons stayed at the hotel several times in the years following their first visit. They wrote to the staff in 2002 in order to congratulate them on their work at the hotel.

In early 2008, an extension to the hotel increased the height of a rear wing to twelve floors and increased bedrooms from 240 to 272. The extension was designed by Robinson Patterson Partnership, now RPP Architects, and was completed late in 2008.

== In popular culture ==
=== Documentaries ===
- Two series of a BBC documentary series Lobby Lives were filmed at the hotel.
- The BBC filmed a further six part documentary series titled The Hotel People, broadcast nationally on BBC Two from 22 August 2022. The series was filmed in 2021 as the hotel emerged from the UK wide lockdowns and COVID-19 restrictions.
- The Europa Hotel – Bombs, Bullets and Business as Usual (26 September 2011) is an hour-long documentary aired on BBC One Northern Ireland. Produced and directed by Richard Weller, the documentary tracked those eventful 40 years through the eyes of a diverse array of contributors.
- In the BBC TV programme Great British Railway Journeys (Series 3, Episode 24), Michael Portillo visited the hotel and stayed in the room occupied by US President Bill Clinton in 1995.
- In the Australian TV programme 60 Minutes, Special Investigation: Spies, Lords and Predators, produced by Stephen Rice and reported on by Ross Coulthart, the hotel is featured as a known hub for serial predatory abusers who would meet at the hotel's bar during the 1970s. Sexual abuse was inflicted on victims by prominent men in various hotel rooms.

=== Television ===
- In Sons of Anarchy, season 3, episode 11 ("Bainne"), the couple who adopted Abel stay at, and are assassinated in, the Europa Hotel.

=== Novels ===
- The opening of Adrian McKinty's Dead I Well May Be occurs in the aftermath of an IRA bombing of the hotel.

=== Music ===
- In the hip-hop track "We Know Something You Don't Know" by DJ Format, Chali 2na and Akil, Chali raps that his task is, among other things, to "absorb the shell blast like I was the most bombed hotel in Belfast".

== See also ==
- Europa Buscentre
