= Subdivisions of Belfast =

Subdivisions of Northern Irish city

The subdivisions of Belfast are a series of divisions of Belfast, Northern Ireland that are used for a variety of cultural, electoral, planning and residential purposes.

The city is traditionally divided into four main areas based on the cardinal points of a compass, each of which form the basis of constituencies for general elections: North Belfast, East Belfast, South Belfast, and West Belfast. These four areas meet at Belfast City Centre. The second traditional divide is that formed by the River Lagan, with the northern bank of the River being part of County Antrim, while the southern bank is part of County Down.

The city's subdivisions reflect the divided nature of Northern Ireland as a whole, with areas tending to be highly segregated, especially in working-class neighbourhoods. Walls known as peace lines, originally erected by the British Army after August 1969, divide fourteen inner city neighbourhoods.

== Townlands ==
The townlands of Belfast are the oldest surviving land divisions in the city. The city's townlands are split between the two traditional counties by the River Lagan, with those townlands north of the river generally in County Antrim, while those on the southern bank are generally part of County Down. Most of these townlands are older than the city itself, and most of their names are derived from the Irish language. As the city grew, these once-rural townlands were built upon and their boundaries became obscured. However, many of the city's streets, roads and housing estates have been named after them.

== Electoral wards ==
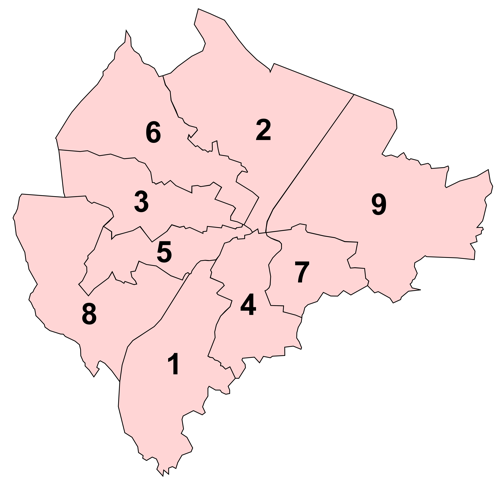
Map showing location of District Electoral Areas prior to 2014 reorganisation: 1: Balmoral; 2: Castle; 3: Court; 4: Laganbank; 5: Lower Falls; 6: Oldpark; 7: Pottinger; 8: Upper Falls; 9: Victoria. Note

The electoral wards of Belfast are subdivisions of the city, used primarily for statistics and elections. Belfast has had 51 wards since May 1973, which were revised in May 1985 and again in May 1993. Wards are the smallest administrative unit in Northern Ireland and are set by the Local Government Boundaries Commissioner and reviewed every 8–10 years.

The wards were redrawn for the 2014 elections.

In elections to Belfast City Council, the 51 wards are split into nine District Electoral Areas (DEAs), each of which contains between five and seven wards, with the number of councillors it elects equal to the number of wards it contains. The current DEAs are:

- Balmoral (6 wards)
- Castle (6 wards)
- Court (5 wards)
- Laganbank (5 wards)
- Lower Falls (5 wards)
- Oldpark (6 wards)
- Pottinger (6 wards)
- Upper Falls (5 wards)
- Ormiston (formerly Victoria) (7 wards)

== Constituencies ==
Belfast's electoral wards are used to create constituencies for elections to the Northern Ireland Assembly and the House of Commons of the United Kingdom. These constituencies are coterminous and are created by amalgamating wards into larger areas, with the city's 51 wards split between the four 'Belfast' constituencies, each of which contains between 11 and 14 wards, although these also contain wards from bordering local authorities. These constituencies follow the tradition of referring to parts of Belfast by the four cardinal directions:

Belfast East

- Belfast East (Assembly)
- Belfast East (parliamentary)

Belfast North

- Belfast North (Assembly)
- Belfast North (parliamentary)

Belfast South

- Belfast South (Assembly)
- Belfast South and Mid Down (parliamentary)

Belfast West

- Belfast West (Assembly)
- Belfast West (parliamentary)

== Cultural quarters ==
The Belfast Quarters refer to a number of distinctive cultural zones within the city of Belfast, whose identities have been developed as a spur to tourism and urban regeneration. These "quarters" differ from the districts into which Belfast is divided.

The term "quarter" does not refer to one fourth (or one quarter) of the city, nor is every area in the centre of Belfast part of one of the quarters. Instead, each "quarter" reflects something about a neighbourhood's history and locale, with the "Quarter" label being something that has come into general use in recent years.

The quarters are as follows:

- Cathedral Quarter
- Gaeltacht Quarter
- Linen Quarter
- Market Quarter
- Queen's Quarter
- Smithfield and Union Quarter
- Titanic Quarter
- Library Quarter
- Station Quarter (Planned)

== Postcodes of Belfast ==
Belfast city centre is divided into two postcode districts, BT1 for the area lying north of the City Hall, and BT2 for the area to its south. The industrial estate and docklands, BT3. The rest of the Belfast post town is divided in a broadly clockwise system. Although BT derives from Belfast, the BT postcode area extends across the whole of Northern Ireland.

Belfast City Centre
BT1 North of Belfast City Hall
BT2 South of Belfast City Hall
BT3 Industrial district

East and South East of Belfast City Hall
BT4 East Belfast
BT5 East Belfast / Castlereagh
BT6 East Belfast / Castlereagh

South and South West of Belfast City Hall
BT7 South Belfast
BT8 Outer South Belfast
BT9 South Belfast

West South West and West of Belfast City Hall
BT10 South Belfast
BT11 West Belfast
BT12 West Belfast
BT17 Outer South West Belfast / Dunmurry

West North West and North of Belfast City Hall
BT13 West Belfast
BT14 Outer North West Belfast
BT15 North Belfast

== Other areas of Belfast ==
=== General ===
- Belfast Metropolitan Area
- Belfast City Centre
- The Golden Mile
- The Holyland

=== Housing estates ===
- Ballybeen
- Braniel
- Clarawood
- Taughmonagh

=== Streets and roads ===
- Antrim Road
- Belmont Road
- Castlereagh Road
- Cluan Place
- Crumlin Road
- Cregagh Road
- Donegall Road
- Falls Road
- Holywood Road
- Lisburn Road
- Malone Road
- Newtownards Road
- Ormeau Road
- Ravenhill Road
- Sandy Row
- Shankill Road
- Shaw's Road
- Shore Road
- Short Strand
- Springfield Road
- Stranmillis Road
- Westlink
- Woodstock Road
- Whitewell Road
