= Belfast quarters =

Distinctive cultural zones within the city of Belfast, Northern Ireland

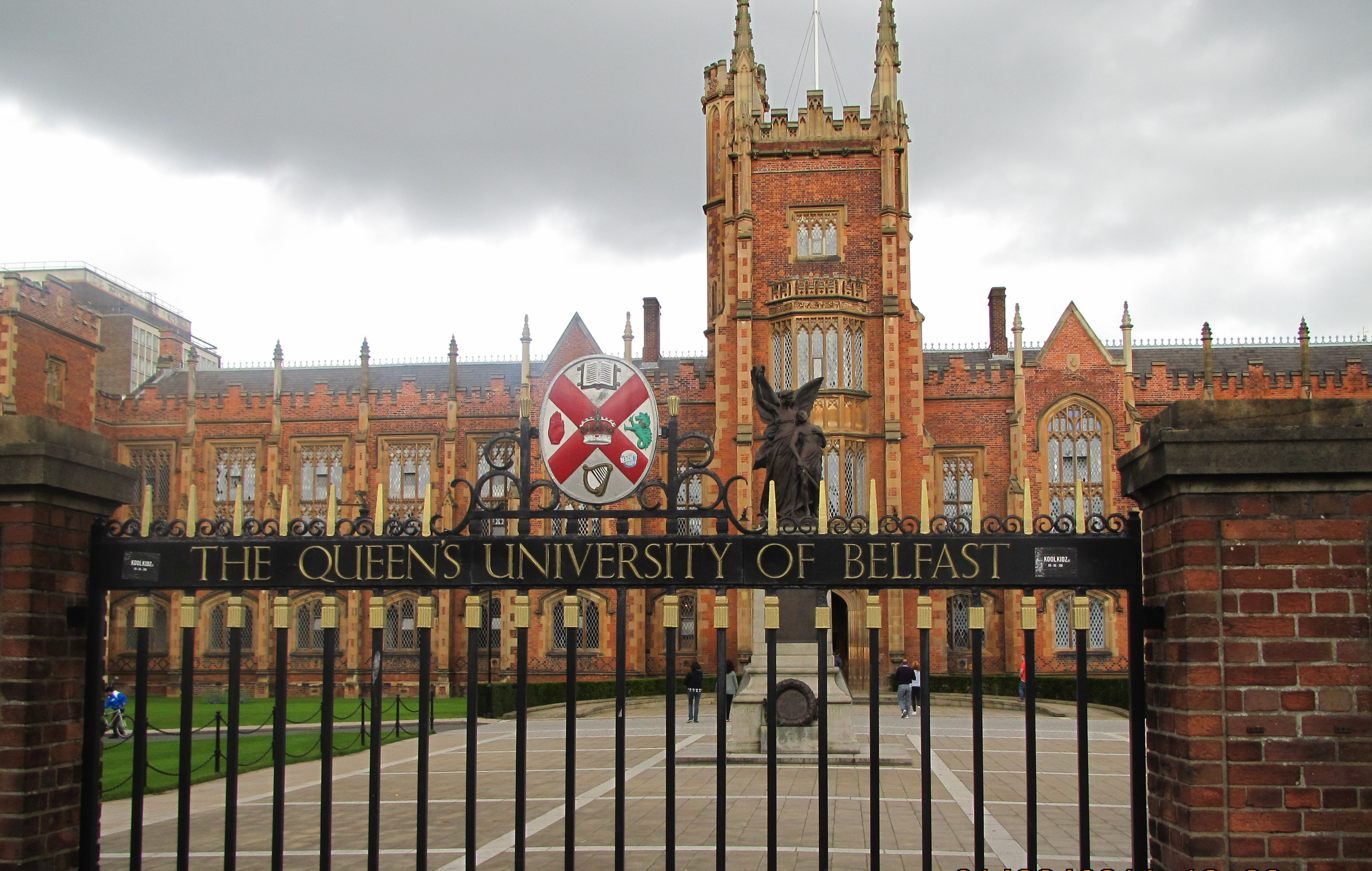
Queen's University Belfast, the centrepiece of Queen's Quarter

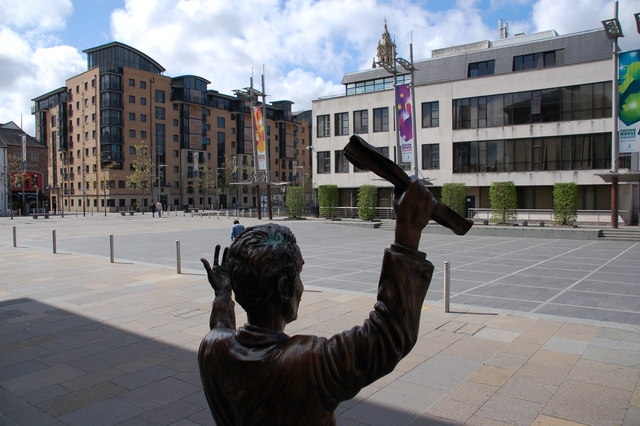
Custom House Square is a major cultural feature of Cathedral Quarter

The Belfast quarters are distinctive cultural zones within the city of Belfast, Northern Ireland, whose identities have been developed as a spur to tourism and urban regeneration. These "quarters" differ from the traditional districts into which Belfast is divided.

The term "quarter" does not refer to one fourth (or one quarter) of the city, nor is every area in the centre of Belfast part of one of the quarters. Instead, each "quarter" reflects something about a neighbourhood's history and locale, with the "quarter" label being something that has come into general use in recent years.

Belfast's official tourism website describes four quarters in the city.

== Cathedral Quarter ==
Cathedral Quarter takes its name from St. Anne's Cathedral and has taken on the mantle of the city's key cultural locality. It boasts a yearly visual and performing arts festival. Custom House Square is one of the city's main outdoor venues for free concerts and street entertainment.

== Titanic Quarter ==
Titanic Quarter covers 75 hectares of reclaimed land adjacent to Belfast harbour, formerly known as Queen's Island. Named after the Titanic, which was built there in 1912, work has begun which aims to transform the former shipyard into "one of the largest waterfront developments in Europe". Plans also include new apartments, a riverside entertainment district, and a major Titanic-themed museum. The museum was opened in 2012 and called Titanic Belfast.

Titanic Quarter also features the The O2 and Odyssey Pavilion, a major entertainment complex which has hosted concerts by such artists as Iron Maiden, Slipknot, Kings of Leon, and Muse, as well as comedy stand-up shows by Peter Kay and Russell Howard. It also played host to the MTV EMA Awards for the very first time on 6 November 2011.

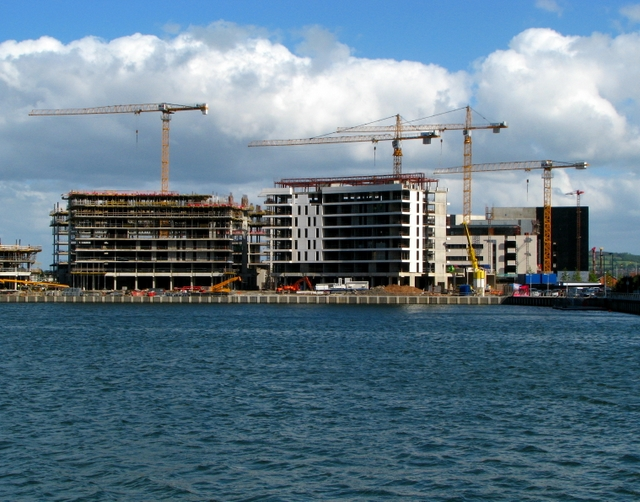
Construction in Titanic Quarter

== Queen's Quarter ==
Queens Quarter is named after Queen's University and is located in South Belfast, famous for its leafy, suburban atmosphere despite its proximity to the city centre. The area has a large student population and hosts the annual Belfast Festival at Queen's each autumn. It is also home to Botanic Gardens and the Ulster Museum, which underwent extensive refurbishment for several years, reopening in 2009. The Golden Mile is the name given to the mile between Belfast City Hall and Queen's University. Taking in Dublin Road, Great Victoria Street, Shaftesbury Square and Bradbury Place, it contains some of the best bars, restaurants and nightclubs in the city. Since the Good Friday Agreement in 1998, the nearby Lisburn Road has developed into the city's most exclusive shopping strip.

== Gaeltacht Quarter ==
The Gaeltacht Quarter is an area ranging from Castle Street in Belfast City centre and westwards along Falls Road in West Belfast which promotes, displays and encourages the use of the Irish language.

== Other quarters ==
As the quarters are not strict mathematical divisions of the city, numerous other quarters have been suggested. These include:

- Smithfield and Union Quarter
- Linen Quarter
- Market Quarter
- Library Quarter
- Church Quarter
- Station Quarter (planned)

== See also ==
- Belfast City Centre
- Belfast Metropolitan Area
- Library Quarter, Belfast
- Tourism in Northern Ireland

== Sources ==
- Financial Times article: Belfast shrugs off talk of hard times, by John Murray Brown. Published: 13 April 2009 23:07
