= Electoral wards of Belfast =

Subdivisions of Belfast, Northern Ireland

The electoral wards of Belfast are subdivisions of the city, used primarily for statistics and elections. Belfast had 51 wards from May 1973, which were revised in May 1985 and again in May 1993. The number of wards was increased to 60 with the 2014 changes in local government. Wards are the smallest administrative unit in Northern Ireland and are set by the Local Government Boundaries Commissioner and reviewed every 8–12 years.

Wards are used to create constituencies for local government authorities, the Northern Ireland Assembly and the House of Commons of the United Kingdom. In elections to Belfast City Council, the 60 wards are split into ten District Electoral Areas, each of which contains between five and seven wards, with the number of councillors it elects equal to the number of wards it contains. The constituencies for elections to the House of Commons and the Assembly are coterminous and are created by amalgamating wards into larger areas, with the city's wards split between the four 'Belfast' constituencies, although these also contain wards from bordering local authorities.

The use of wards for statistical purposes by the Northern Ireland Statistics and Research Agency (NISRA) has changed since the creation of 'Census Output Areas' (5022 in total) and 'Super Output Areas' (890 in total), which were created to address the variance in size of the 582 wards across Northern Ireland. Each ward contains several Super Output Area, which in turn are made up of a number of Census Output Areas.

== Current wards ==
The wards were redrawn for the 2014 elections.

The table below shows the divisions from 2014 to present.

Ward	District Electoral Area	Population (2021 Census)	Catholic community background	Protestant community background	Other religious community background	No religious community background
Andersonstown	Black Mountain	4,648	93.95%	2.58%	0.69%	2.78%
Ardoyne	Oldpark	5,490	90.82%	5.19%	0.98%	3.01%
Ballygomartin	Court	5,952	9.74%	77.92%	1.04%	11.29%
Ballymacarrett	Titanic	5,905	44.35%	39.44%	5.23%	10.97%
Ballymurphy	Black Mountain	5,131	93.12%	3.53%	1.13%	2.22%
Ballysillan	Oldpark	5,289	9.34%	73.81%	1.78%	15.07%
Beechmount	Black Mountain	5,395	83.47%	5.67%	6.08%	4.78%
Beersbridge	Titanic	6,609	15.43%	58.74%	3.48%	22.35%
Bellevue	Castle	5,427	64.14%	23.75%	2.06%	10.04%
Belmont	Ormiston	4,695	11.18%	72.16%	1.77%	14.89%
Belvoir	Balmoral	5,359	24.20%	59.60%	1.40%	14.80%
Blackstaff	Botanic	7,547	16.14%	56.90%	9.30%	17.66%
Bloomfield	Titanic	5,894	18.49%	57.80%	3.24%	20.46%
Cavehill	Castle	4,434	59.99%	31.94%	0.99%	7.08%
Central	Botanic	15,445	50.88%	18.30%	11.02%	19.80%
Chichester Park	Castle	5,409	61.73%	25.05%	3.42%	9.80%
Cliftonville	Oldpark	5,657	71.59%	19.50%	1.70%	7.21%
Clonard	Court	5,999	86.93%	5.57%	3.95%	3.55%
Collin Glen	Black Mountain	5,657	92.40%	4.15%	1.08%	2.37%
Connswater	Titanic	5,930	16.17%	60.37%	2.36%	21.10%
Cregagh	Lisnasharragh	4,587	32.03%	52.21%	1.42%	14.34%
Duncairn	Castle	8,338	35.75%	41.80%	6.42%	16.04%
Dunmurry	Collin	5,205	68.51%	22.48%	2.11%	6.90%
Falls	Court	5,179	89.71%	4.65%	2.53%	3.11%
Falls Park	Black Mountain	4,742	93.69%	2.51%	1.29%	2.51%
Finaghy	Balmoral	4,529	52.75%	34.89%	4.31%	8.06%
Forth River	Court	4,920	20.02%	67.28%	0.98%	11.73%
Fortwilliam	Castle	4,717	48.55%	38.94%	2.23%	10.28%
Garnerville	Ormiston	4,788	10.86%	73.62%	1.02%	14.49%
Gilnahirk	Ormiston	5,153	8.17%	74.42%	1.03%	16.38%
Hillfoot	Lisnasharragh	4,582	25.27%	59.32%	1.83%	13.57%
Innisfayle	Castle	5,315	43.78%	44.05%	1.22%	10.95%
Knock	Ormiston	5,010	19.60%	61.98%	2.00%	16.43%
Ladybrook	Collin	4,817	81.71%	11.75%	1.54%	5.00%
Lagmore	Collin	8,345	92.83%	3.73%	0.83%	2.61%
Legoniel	Oldpark	6,135	53.56%	34.87%	1.96%	9.62%
Malone	Balmoral	4,811	64.41%	25.13%	2.76%	7.69%
Merok	Lisnasharragh	4,438	11.72%	68.25%	2.59%	17.44%
Musgrave	Balmoral	4,837	60.26%	28.65%	4.07%	7.01%
New Lodge	Oldpark	4,881	84.47%	6.95%	3.24%	5.35%
Orangefield	Lisnasharragh	4,756	13.37%	66.76%	2.14%	17.72%
Ormeau	Botanic	6,532	54.27%	22.80%	5.71%	17.22%
Poleglass	Collin	6,103	93.36%	3.31%	1.33%	2.00%
Ravenhill	Lisnasharragh	4,823	41.51%	41.90%	1.95%	14.64%
Rosetta	Lisnasharragh	5,794	56.90%	24.28%	4.82%	14.00%
Sandown	Ormiston	4,472	11.90%	69.79%	2.26%	16.06%
Shandon	Ormiston	5,377	12.22%	71.75%	1.28%	14.75%
Shankill	Court	6,445	5.99%	80.43%	1.43%	12.15%
Shaw's Road	Black Mountain	5,480	92.66%	2.59%	1.50%	3.25%
Stewartstown	Collin	4,579	93.64%	3.28%	0.81%	2.27%
Stormont	Ormiston	5,045	14.19%	68.19%	1.55%	16.08%
Stranmillis	Botanic	8,978	48.28%	30.73%	5.41%	15.57%
Sydenham	Titanic	5,589	12.60%	63.07%	4.78%	19.56%
Turf Lodge	Black Mountain	4,569	94.92%	2.08%	1.03%	1.97%
Twinbrook	Collin	4,917	93.45%	3.46%	0.73%	2.36%
Upper Malone	Balmoral	4,974	32.75%	50.80%	3.76%	12.69%
Water Works	Oldpark	6,909	70.04%	17.28%	4.57%	8.11%
Windsor	Botanic	11,302	43.57%	29.58%	9.32%	17.54%
Woodstock	Titanic	6,431	24.90%	49.09%	5.85%	20.17%
Woodvale	Court	5,170	8.03%	76.96%	1.61%	13.40%
Belfast City Council	60	345,418	48.72%	36.37%	3.33%	11.58%

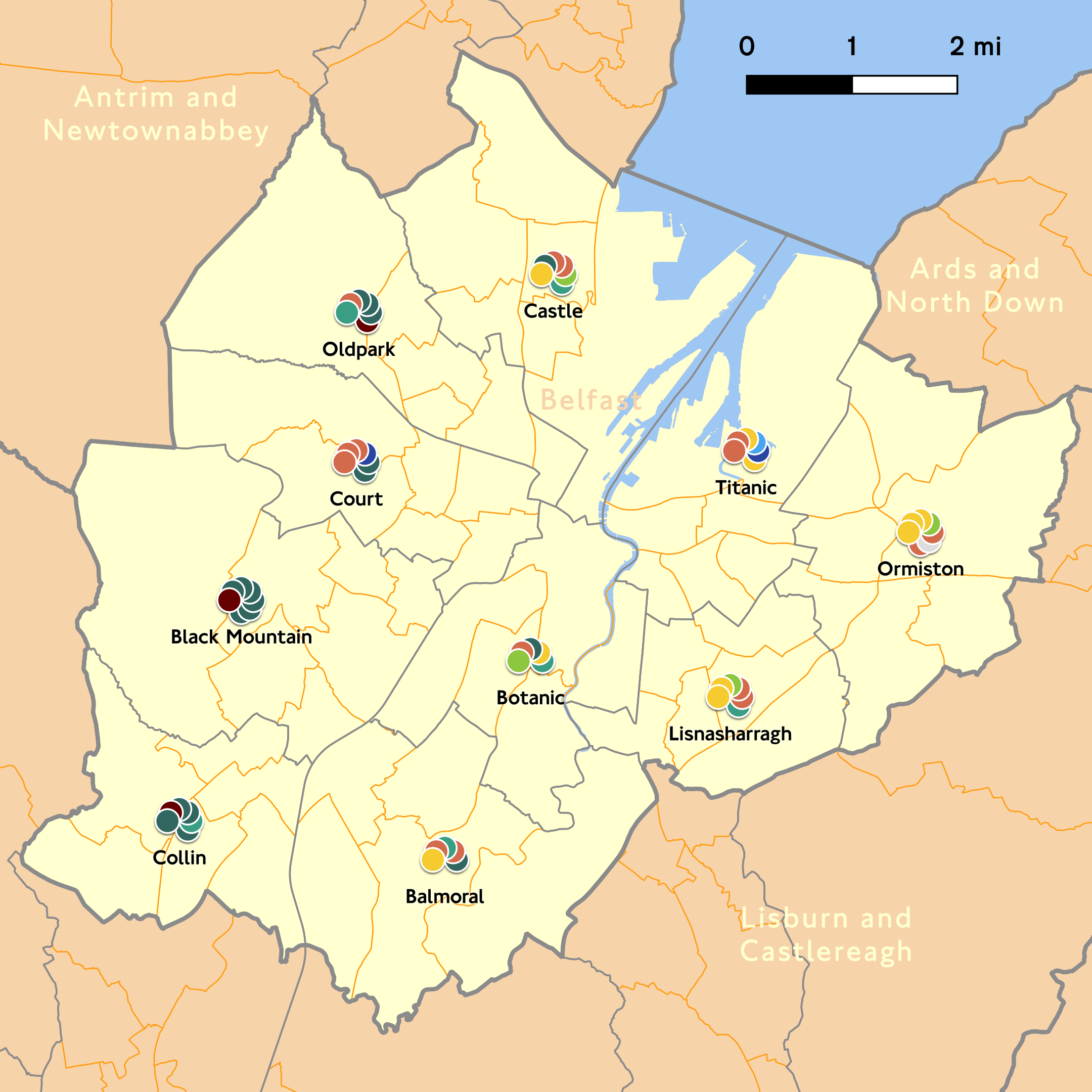
Map showing seats held by each party from 2019 to 2023 in each DEA, in order elected.

== History ==
From 1928 until May 1973, Belfast was divided into 15 wards, each represented by a total of four aldermen or councillors. The 15 wards were Duncairn, Dock, Clifton, Shankill, Court, Woodvale, Smithfield, Falls, Saint Anne's, Saint George's, Windsor, Cromac, Ormeau, Pottinger and Victoria.

By the early 1970s, population shifts had resulted in significant differences in the electorates of the wards. Although the wards continued to have four representatives on Belfast City Council, electorates varied from less than 5,000 in the smallest ward, Smithfield, to almost 40,000 in the largest ward, Victoria. The review of local government which took place in the early 1970s expanded Belfast to take in some of the newer housing estates on the fringes of the city and attempted to equalise electorates. Initially, Belfast was to have been divided into 52 wards. Following a public review, one ward, Tullycarnet, was excluded from Belfast and became instead the Castlereagh wards of Tullycarnet and Gilnahirk. The remaining 51 wards were intended to elect one member each using the first past the post electoral system. The reintroduction of the single transferable vote method of election meant that a different system was required. The 51 wards were therefore grouped into 8 electoral areas, distinguished by letters, with each electoral area returning either 6 or 7 councillors.

By the early 1980s, population shifts, demolition of some of the older housing estates and residential flight caused by the Troubles had again led to substantial disparities in the electorates of the wards. Some wards in inner city Belfast such as Crumlin had lost over 70% of their population. The review of local government which took place from 1982 to 1984 created 51 wards, many new or substantially different from their namesakes. The initial proposals, published in 1983, survived unchanged with a few exceptions. The proposed Peter's Hill ward was renamed Saint Anne's. The Donegall ward, one of the few unchanged wards, was renamed Blackstaff. In inner south Belfast, the Saint George's, University and Cromac wards were to have been replaced with an eastern ward, to be called Linenhall, and a western ward, to be called College. Following public inquiries, the wards were replaced with a southern ward, Botanic, and a northern ward, Shaftesbury, which merged the former Cromac and Saint George's wards. As in 1973, these wards were grouped into electoral areas electing between 5 and 7 councillors.

A further review took place in 1991–1992 and compared to the review of the 1980s, saw minor changes. In the Court electoral area, the existing Shankill ward was split between three other wards. One of these three wards which gained territory, Saint Anne's, having lost its eponymous area to the Duncairn ward, assumed the Shankill name. Initially, the number of wards was to have been cut to 50, however after a public inquiry, a new 51st ward was created. Most of the existing Finaghy ward was renamed Musgrave, while a new Finaghy ward was created from the southern parts of the older Finaghy ward and the Upper Malone ward, which compensated by gaining territory from Malone and Stranmillis wards.

=== 1993–2013 ===
The table below shows the divisions from 1993 to 2013.

Map	District Electoral Area	Councillors/ Wards	Population (2011 Census)	Catholic community background (%)	Protestant community background (%)	Other religious community background (%)	No religious community background (%)	Area	Density	NI Assembly	UK Parliament
	Balmoral	6	32,017	43.8%	44.8%	3.1%	8.3%	13.71 km^{2}	2,335/km^{2}	Belfast South	Belfast South
	Castle	6	29,366	50.3%	41.5%	1.4%	6.9%	19 km^{2}	1,546/km^{2}	Belfast North	Belfast North
	Court	5	21,886	10.3%	82.5%	0.7%	6.5%	9.12 km^{2}	2,400/km^{2}	Belfast North (2); Belfast West (3)	Belfast North (2); Belfast West (3)
	Laganbank	5	36,790	51.9%	33.3%	3.8%	11%	8.27 km^{2}	4,449/km^{2}	Belfast South	Belfast South
	Lower Falls	5	26,588	91.1%	5.8%	0.3%	1.8%	5.93 km^{2}	4,484/km^{2}	Belfast West	Belfast West
	Oldpark	6	34,131	65.6%	29.2%	0.8%	4.4%	13.68 km^{2}	2,495 /km^{2}	Belfast North	Belfast North
	Pottinger	6	33,057	25.3%	61.2%	1.8%	11.7%	6.17 km^{2}	5,358 /km^{2}	Belfast East (4); Belfast South (2)	Belfast East (4); Belfast South (2)
	Upper Falls	5	28,840	92.2%	5.5%	0.5%	1.8%	15.83 km^{2}	1,822/km^{2}	Belfast West	Belfast West
	Victoria	7	38,287	12.4%	75%	1.7%	10.8%	23.14 km^{2}	1,655 /km^{2}	Belfast East	Belfast East
Belfast City Council		51	280,962	48.6%	42.3%	1.7%	7.4%	114.85 km^{2}	2,446 /km^{2}		

Note: data for DEAs in the above table is based on aggregating the referenced figures for the relevant wards in the table below.

Ward	District Electoral Area	Population (2011 Census)	Catholic community background (%)	Protestant community background (%)	Other religious community background (%)	No religious community background (%)	Area	Density	NI Assembly	UK Parliament	Ref
Andersonstown	Upper Falls	4,907	94.54	3.59	0.26	1.61	1.08 km^{2}	4,544/km^{2}	Belfast West	Belfast West	
Ardoyne	Oldpark	5,987	92.83	5.11	0.25	1.80	0.58 km^{2}	10,322/km^{2}	Belfast North	Belfast North	
Ballyhackamore	Victoria	5,939	17.24	68.16	1.90	12.70	1.15 km^{2}	5,164/km^{2}	Belfast East	Belfast East	
Ballymacarrett	Pottinger	4,908	51.39	41.16	1.41	6.05	0.78 km^{2}	6,292/km^{2}	Belfast East	Belfast East	
Ballynafeigh	Laganbank	5,928	56.95	27.11	2.85	13.09	0.67 km^{2}	8,848/km^{2}	Belfast South	Belfast South	
Ballysillan	Oldpark	5,626	7.79	83.31	1.37	7.54	1.11 km^{2}	5,068/km^{2}	Belfast North	Belfast North	
Beechmount	Lower Falls	5,485	90.81	6.09	0.64	2.46	0.84 km^{2}	6,530/km^{2}	Belfast West	Belfast West	
Bellevue	Castle	4,910	63.69	29.25	1.08	5.99	2.96 km^{2}	1,659/km^{2}	Belfast North	Belfast North	
Belmont	Victoria	6,165	8.61	80.63	0.99	9.76	1.79 km^{2}	3,444/km^{2}	Belfast East	Belfast East	
Blackstaff	Balmoral	3,998	15.01	71.51	1.83	11.66	1.92 km^{2}	2,082/km^{2}	Belfast South	Belfast South	
Bloomfield	Pottinger	5,453	16.10	69.72	1.69	12.49	0.74 km^{2}	7,369/km^{2}	Belfast East	Belfast East	
Botanic	Laganbank	8,945	60.83	23.25	3.90	12.02	1.3 km^{2}	6,881/km^{2}	Belfast South	Belfast South	
Castleview	Castle	4,722	38.14	54.19	1.19	6.48	1.41 km^{2}	3,349/km^{2}	Belfast North	Belfast North	
Cavehill	Castle	4,820	57.14	37.70	0.87	4.29	3.41 km^{2}	1,413/km^{2}	Belfast North	Belfast North	
Cherryvalley	Victoria	5,920	14.46	75.27	0.84	9.43	1.99 km^{2}	2,975/km^{2}	Belfast East	Belfast East	
Chichester Park	Castle	5,452	74.34	17.20	1.58	6.88	0.95 km^{2}	5,739/km^{2}	Belfast North	Belfast North	
Cliftonville	Oldpark	5,330	71.01	23.60	0.68	4.71	1.18 km^{2}	4,517/km^{2}	Belfast North	Belfast North	
Clonard	Lower Falls	4,975	90.45	6.35	0.64	2.55	0.61 km^{2}	8,156/km^{2}	Belfast West	Belfast West	
Crumlin	Court	4,582	11.33	82.28	0.55	5.85	0.83 km^{2}	5,520/km^{2}	Belfast North	Belfast North	
Duncairn	Castle	4,901	23.57	63.88	2.24	10.30	9.24 km^{2}	530/km^{2}	Belfast North	Belfast North	
Falls	Lower Falls	5,184	87.56	7.52	2.31	2.60	1.2 km^{2}	4,320/km^{2}	Belfast West	Belfast West	
Falls Park	Upper Falls	5,343	94.40	3.28	0.73	1.59	2.35 km^{2}	2,274/km^{2}	Belfast West	Belfast West	
Finaghy	Balmoral	4,555	49.18	42.63	2.63	5.55	2.59 km^{2}	1,759/km^{2}	Belfast South	Belfast South	
Fortwilliam	Castle	4,561	41.28	50.34	1.16	7.21	1.03 km^{2}	4,428/km^{2}	Belfast North	Belfast North	
Glen Road	Upper Falls	5,573	95.14	3.25	0.52	1.09	1.57 km^{2}	3,550/km^{2}	Belfast West	Belfast West	
Glencairn	Court	3,749	17.47	75.54	0.85	6.13	4.1 km^{2}	914/km^{2}	Belfast West	Belfast West	
Glencolin	Upper Falls	6,498	93.15	5.11	0.20	1.54	9.54 km^{2}	681/km^{2}	Belfast West	Belfast West	
Highfield	Court	5,651	9.49	82.59	0.88	7.04	2.69 km^{2}	2,101/km^{2}	Belfast West	Belfast West	
Island	Victoria	5,014	13.88	69.78	4.55	11.79	3.81 km^{2}	1,316/km^{2}	Belfast East	Belfast East	
Knock	Victoria	4,827	9.14	79.66	1.22	9.99	1.12 km^{2}	4,310/km^{2}	Belfast East	Belfast East	
Ladybrook	Upper Falls	6,519	85.30	10.94	0.64	3.11	1.29 km^{2}	5,053/km^{2}	Belfast West	Belfast West	
Legoniel	Oldpark	6,409	48.24	45.40	0.76	5.59	8.82 km^{2}	727/km^{2}	Belfast North	Belfast North	
Malone	Balmoral	5,555	61.17	30.28	2.29	6.26	2.18 km^{2}	2,548/km^{2}	Belfast South	Belfast South	
Musgrave	Balmoral	4,927	60.56	32.94	1.68	4.81	1.78 km^{2}	2,768/km^{2}	Belfast South	Belfast South	
New Lodge	Oldpark	4,950	89.23	7.64	0.87	2.26	0.72 km^{2}	6,875/km^{2}	Belfast North	Belfast North	
Orangefield	Pottinger	5,619	11.02	76.95	1.44	10.59	1.46 km^{2}	3,849/km^{2}	Belfast East	Belfast East	
Ravenhill	Pottinger	6,041	39.65	46.90	2.00	11.46	1.88 km^{2}	3,213/km^{2}	Belfast South	Belfast South	
Rosetta	Laganbank	6,564	59.00	30.59	2.04	8.36	1.6 km^{2}	4,103/km^{2}	Belfast South	Belfast South	
Shaftesbury	Laganbank	7,214	35.31	47.32	6.72	10.65	2.23 km^{2}	3,235/km^{2}	Belfast South	Belfast South	
Shankill	Court	3,816	7.86	84.51	0.68	6.94	0.93 km^{2}	4,103/km^{2}	Belfast West	Belfast West	
Stormont	Victoria	5,548	12.94	75.63	1.28	10.15	7.04 km^{2}	788/km^{2}	Belfast East	Belfast East	
Stranmillis	Laganbank	8,139	47.30	38.67	3.05	10.98	2.47 km^{2}	3,295/km^{2}	Belfast South	Belfast South	
Sydenham	Victoria	4,874	9.91	76.00	1.81	12.29	6.24 km^{2}	781/km^{2}	Belfast East	Belfast East	
The Mount	Pottinger	5,591	16.13	68.32	1.27	14.27	0.75 km^{2}	7,455/km^{2}	Belfast East	Belfast East	
Upper Malone	Balmoral	4,841	29.37	60.05	2.52	8.06	4.32 km^{2}	1,121/km^{2}	Belfast South	Belfast South	
Upper Springfield	Lower Falls	5,250	93.50	4.59	0.32	1.58	2.5 km^{2}	2,100/km^{2}	Belfast West	Belfast West	
Water Works	Oldpark	5,829	87.63	7.09	0.89	4.39	1.27 km^{2}	4,590/km^{2}	Belfast North	Belfast North	
Whiterock	Lower Falls	5,694	93.12	4.74	0.30	1.84	0.78 km^{2}	7,300/km^{2}	Belfast West	Belfast West	
Windsor	Balmoral	8,141	41.63	40.73	5.80	11.84	0.92 km^{2}	8,849/km^{2}	Belfast South	Belfast South	
Woodstock	Pottinger	5,445	19.38	63.31	2.81	14.51	0.56 km^{2}	9,723/km^{2}	Belfast South	Belfast South	
Woodvale	Court	4,088	6.02	86.96	0.59	6.43	0.57 km^{2}	7,172/km^{2}	Belfast North	Belfast North	
Belfast City Council		280,962	48.58	42.30	1.72	7.40	114.85 km^{2}	2,446/km^{2}			

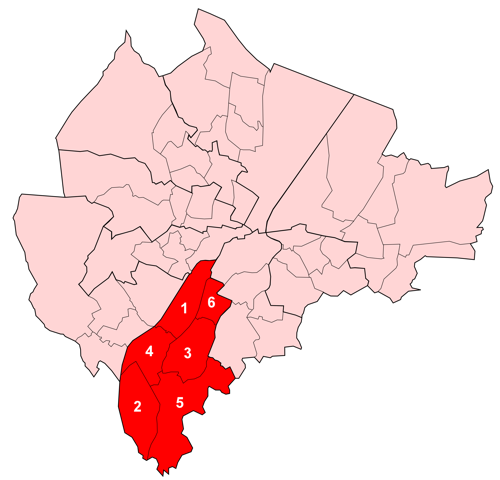
Balmoral
1. Blackstaff
2. Finaghy
3. Malone
4. Musgrave
5. Upper Malone
6. Windsor

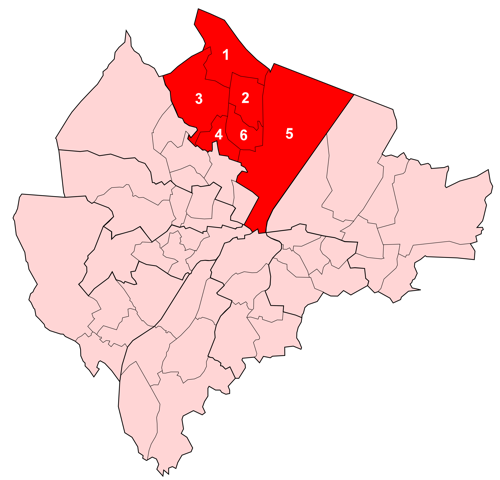
Castle
1. Bellevue
2. Castleview
3. Cavehill
4. Chichester Park
5. Duncairn
6. Fortwilliam

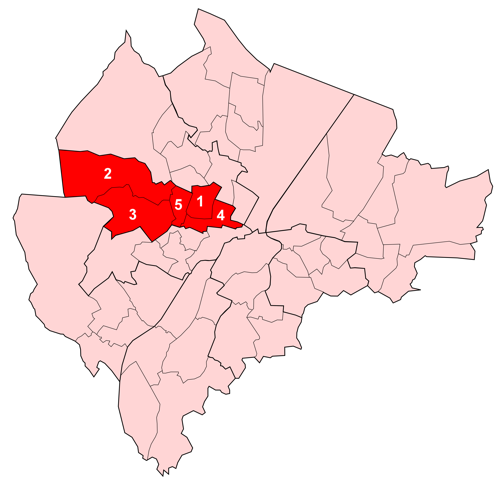
Court
1. Crumlin
2. Glencairn
3. Highfield
4. Shankill
5. Woodvale

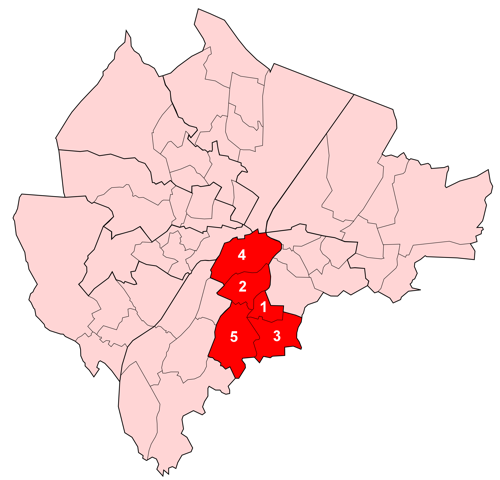
Laganbank
1. Ballynafeigh
2. Botanic
3. Rosetta
4. Shaftesbury
5. Stranmillis

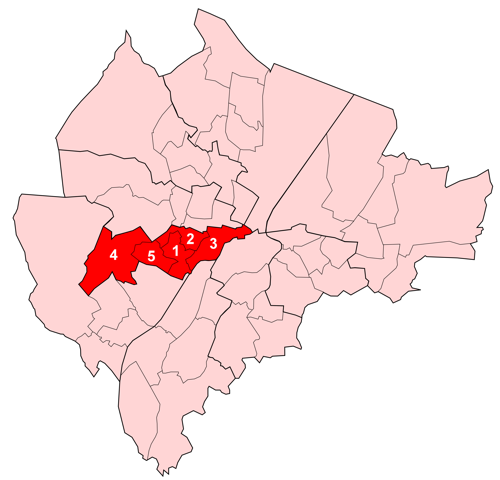
Lower Falls
1. Beechmount
2. Clonard
3. Falls
4. Upper Springfield
5. Whiterock

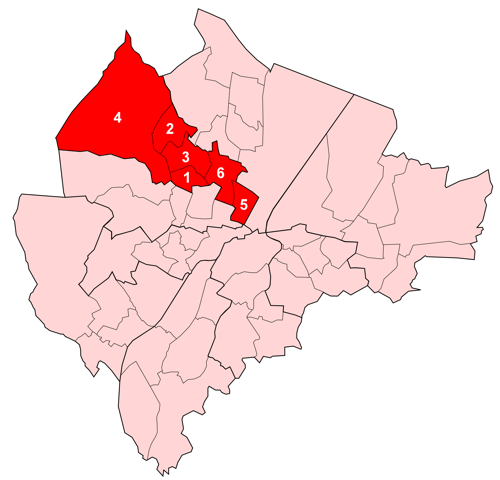
Oldpark
1. Ardoyne
2. Ballysillan
3. Cliftonville
4. Legoniel
5. New Lodge
6. Water Works

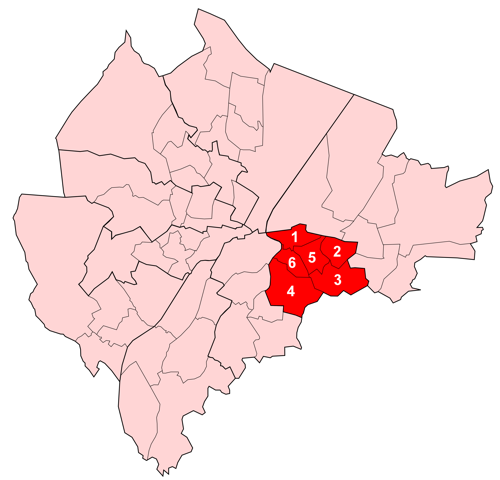
Pottinger
1. Ballymacarrett
2. Bloomfield
3. Orangefield
4. Ravenhill
5. The Mount
6. Woodstock

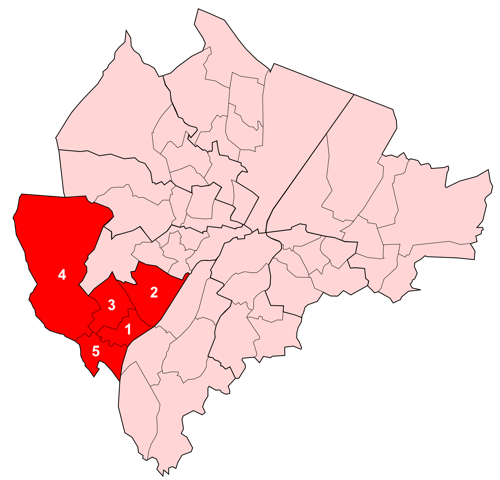
Upper Falls
1. Andersonstown
2. Falls Park
3. Glen Road
4. Glencolin
5. Ladybrook

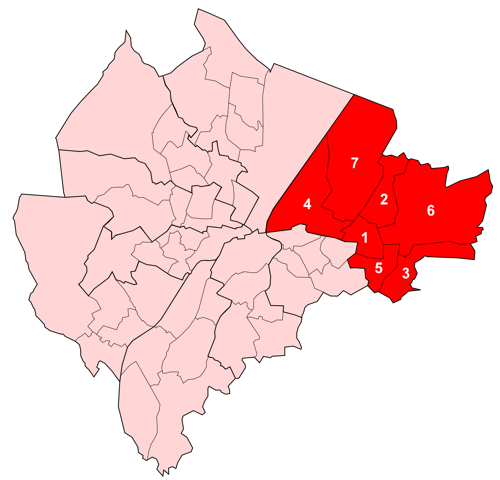
Victoria
1. Ballyhackamore
2. Belmont
3. Cherryvalley
4. Island
5. Knock
6. Stormont
7. Sydenham

=== 1973 to 1985 ===
Ward	Electoral area	Boundaries	Population (1971)	Population (1981)	Westminster constituency(s)
Rosetta	A	Upper Ormeau Road and Rosetta areas	7,633	6,628	
Ballynafeigh	A	Ballynafeigh	6,674	5,231	
Ormeau	A	Areas around Ravenhill Road from Park Road to Albert Bridge Road	6,710	4,718	
Willowfield	A	Areas bordering Woodstock and Cregagh Roads to city boundary	7,417	6,292	
Orangefield	A	Orangefield	7,921	6,801	
The Mount	A	Bordered by Ravenhill Rd, My Lady's Rd, Willowfield St, Clara St, Beersbridge Rd, Connswater and Albertbridge Rd	8,765	4,640	
Ballymacarrett	A	Areas between Newtownards Rd and Albertbridge Rd	8,743	4,472	
Island	B	Areas north of Newtownards Rd and between rivers Connswater and Lagan	8,665	4,100	
Sydenham	B	Bordered by Connswater, Newtownards Rd, Holywood Rd and Belfast Rd	7,931	6,606	
Belmont	B	Bordered by Holywood Rd, Belmont Rd and city boundary	8,948	7,825	
Bloomfield	B	Bordered by Bloomfield walkway, Connswater, Abetta Parade, Dunraven Gardens, North Rd and Grand Parade	6,455	5,510	
Ballyhackamore	B	Bordered by Bloomfield walkway, Belmont Road, Belmont Church Rd, Knock Parkand area north of Orangefield Rd and Sandhill Gardens	7,493	6,434	
Shandon	B	Knock, Shandon and Cherryvalley areas	8,715	7,985	
Stormont	B	Areas north of Upper Newtownards Rd, east of Belmont Church Rd and south and east of Belmont Road	8,778	7,675	
Finaghy	C	Finaghy	7,376	6,599	
Upper Malone	C	Upper Malone and Taughmonagh areas	7,920	7,038	
Malone	C	areas around Malone Road	6,775	6,462	
Windsor	C	Windsor	9,925	6,600	
Stranmillis	C	Stranmillis	7939	6541	
University	C	Areas around Queen's University and Lower Ormeau Road	7,830	4,609	
Saint James	D	Beechmount and Saint James areas	9,202	8,043	
Whiterock	D		10,861	6,847	
Milltown	D	areas around Milltown Cemetery and Falls Park	9,864	7,291	
Andersonstown	D	Andersonstown and Glen Road areas	8,433	6,406	
Suffolk	D	Glencolin and Suffolk areas	11,031	9,396	
Ladybrook	D		11,044	10,085	
Legoniel	E		7,218	5,504	
Ballysillan	E	Ballysillan	8,181	5,967	
Ardoyne	E	Ardoyne and Glenbryn areas	9,547	5,902	
Ballygomartin	E	Ballygomartin and Glencairn areas	7,734	8,467	
Highfield	E	Highfield	8,516	5,703	
Woodvale	E	Woodvale	7,628	5,889	
Falls	F	Lower Falls Road around Divis tower	5,655	2,645	
Clonard	F	Clonard	8,491	5,463	
Grosvenor	F	Areas around Grosvenor Road	7,385	2,239	
Donegall	F	Areas currently between Westlink and Railway line, southern boundary Stockman's Lane	7,789	6,227	
Saint Georges	F	Sandy Row and The Village	7,690	2,931	
Cromac	F	Donegall Pass and The Markets	6,991	2,446	
New Lodge	G	Bordered by Antrim Road, Duncairn Gardens, North Queen Street and Clifton Street	8,090	5,097	
Central	G	Barrack St and John St, Brown Square, City Centre, Docks including all areas between Motorway and Belfast Lough, Henry St and Lancaster St areas, Smithfield, Unity Flats	7,085	2,132	
Shankill	G	Areas between Shankill and Crumlin Roads, east of Cambrai St as far as western half of Crimea St	8,337	5,811	
Crumlin	G	Bounded by Flax St, Ardoyne Ave, Oldpark Ave, Cliftonville Rd, Antrim Rd and Crumlin Rd	12,414	3,250	
Court	G	From Carlisle Circus, down the Westlink, up Divis Street, along Northumberland Street, the Shankill Road, Crimea Street and then down the Crumlin Road to Carlisle Circus	7,345	3,325	
North Howard	G	Starting from the Falls Rd, along North Howard St, Cupar Way and Lanark Way, down the Shankill Rd and along Northumberland St and the Falls Rd	6,957	1,883	
Bellevue	H	Bellevue	7,530	6,256	
Castleview	H	Innisfayle, Downview and Parkmount areas	7,653	6,766	
Grove	H	Areas from Skegoniell Avenue to Mountcollyer Street and Lower Cavehill Road to Kansas Avenue	6,230	4,635	
Duncairn	H	Tiger's Bay and Newington	8,408	4,196	
Fortwilliam	H	Fortwilliam	6,690	5,879	
Cavehill	H	Cavehill Road and areas to Kansas Avenue	8,430	8,239	
Cliftonville	H	Cliftonville, Torrens and Brookvale areas	9,637	7,537	

== See also ==
- Belfast City Council
- Local government in Northern Ireland
- Members of Belfast City Council
- Subdivisions of Belfast
