= Baile an Gharraí =

Baile an Gharraí (Irish for "town of the garden" or "town of the enclosed field") may refer to several places on the island of Ireland:

- Ballingarry, County Limerick, a village on the Kilmallock–Rathkeale road
- Ballingarry, South Tipperary, a village near the Kilkenny border
- Ballingarry, North Tipperary, a townland and parish near Borrisokane
- Ballymagarry, a townland in Belfast
