= Taughmonagh =

Coordinates: 54.55752°N 5.970507°W

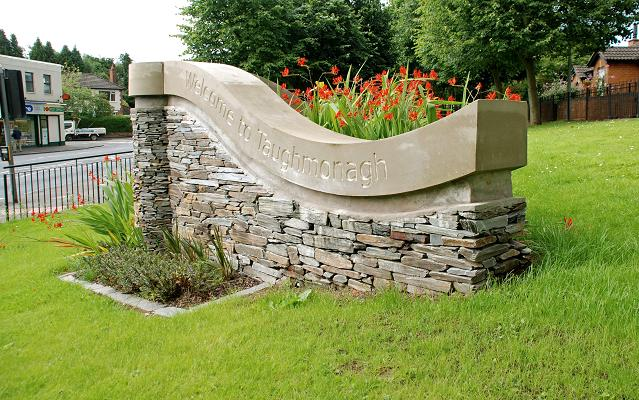
- Welcome to Taughmonagh, Belfast - A welcome sign and floral display near the entrance to the Taughmonagh estate, at The Dub, on the Upper Malone Road.

- Location within Northern Ireland
- District: Belfast City Council
- County: County Antrim
- Country: Northern Ireland
- Sovereign state: United Kingdom
- Post town: BELFAST
- Postcode district: BT9
- Dialling code: 028
- UK Parliament: Belfast South
- NI Assembly: Belfast South

Taughmonagh (from Irish Tuath Monach 'tribe of Monaigh') is a small housing estate in south Belfast, Northern Ireland, within the civil parishes of Drumbeg and Shankill, and barony of Belfast Upper. Taughmonagh has become known for being a staunchly loyalist estate.

== Local amenities ==
Taughmonagh is situated between the Upper Malone Road and Lisburn Road. On the Upper Malone Road, the residents can make use of various shops and amenities at the Dubs Stores. Towards the Lisburn Road, the many amenities include a petrol station, take-aways and further shops and restaurants in the neighbouring Finaghy area. Within Taughmonagh, there is a small convenience store which is often referred to as "the wee shop". In September 2007, a new Presbyterian church (Rev Arnold Frank Memorial Presbyterian Church) was completed, replacing the previous church which was built in 1954.

The main community group is Taughmonagh Community Forum formed in 1996 which supports a Family Learning Centre, a Community Resource Centre and operates a day nursery called "Scribbles". The Community Forum also operates a number of inter-community and cross-community projects including links with neighbouring Benmore and Annadale through the Live and Learn Open Doors Project, and cross-border links with Manorhamilton, County Leitrim in the Republic of Ireland.

The Taughmonagh Youth Club is available for those from Primary Three (aged 6/7) up to 14th year secondary (aged 17/18) and is open two nights of the week. The area also contains a small children's park, which has recently been renovated with an enclosed football/basketball area.

The estate has its own social club which is used by the community and also serves meals. The social club was in the media in 2005 with a visit from then-Irish President, Mary McAleese, visiting the loyalist estate. In June 2009, this trend of opening tours to visitors from the Republic of Ireland continued with a visit from a group from Manorhamilton as part of a cross-border initiative.

There is a small Community Gym, which was refurbished at the end of 2018.

== Sports ==
There is also many football supporters clubs in Taughmonagh, such as the Taughmonagh Rangers supporters club, the Manchester United supporters club, the Northern Ireland football supporters club and the Leeds United supporters club. These clubs go to their respective football matches.

Taughmonagh Young Men F.C. play in the Northern Amateur League 2B division. A notable game was their February 2023 match against premier division team, Immaculata F.C., in which they were heavily defeated 10–2, and subsequently crashed out of the Clarence Cup.

== Education ==
A small controlled-primary school, Taughmonagh Primary School, is in the Findon Gardens area of Taughmonagh. There were approximately over 262 pupils enrolled in the school as of 2018/2019. Its pupils are predominantly Protestant. The campus also features a nursery.

Nearby on Upper Malone Road is the Fleming Fulton School for children with physical disabilities.

== Transport ==
The area is serviced by the 9B/9C Metro bus, which travels to and from Belfast city centre via Finnis Drive and Lisburn Road, and by the 8A (City Centre-Stranmillis-Malone), 8B (City Centre-Malone), 8C/8D (City Centre-Malone-Ladybrook) routes, which all have stops at nearby Dub Lane on Upper Malone Road.

The nearest train stations are at Finaghy and Balmoral (opposite the King's Hall). Both of these stations lie on NI Railways' Portadown–Bangor line.

== Housing ==
When the area was first built, the houses consisted of very basic, small, prefabricated aluminium bungalows, with the estate nicknamed "Tin Town". The area was regenerated and there are now about 600 houses. These houses were historically owned by the Northern Ireland Housing Executive, with 94% of houses in the area being publicly rented and only 4% being owner-occupied in 2001, but as of 2011 many of the residents have bought their houses from the executive via the 'right-to-buy' initiative resulting in public housing dropping to 54.87% and the proportion of residents owning their home rising to 32.3%.

Radius Housing, a non-profit organisation dedicated to providing housing, care and support to elderly and disabled people within the community, it also manages some properties in Taughmonagh. It offers practical assistance and support to repair, adapt or improve homes across Northern Ireland. Prior to merging in 2017, the Fold Housing Trust carried out this role in the community.

== Paramilitary activity ==
A predominantly loyalist area, Taughmonagh has for a number of years been a stronghold of the Ulster Defence Association (UDA) with two of the organisation's South Belfast Brigadiers, Alex Kerr and incumbent Jackie McDonald, based in the estate. McDonald assumed control of the UDA's South Belfast Brigade following the assassination of John McMichael by the Provisional IRA in 1987. In less than a year. however, he was replaced within the organisation by Kerr after he was arrested for running extortion rackets. With Kerr being on good terms with the UDA's West Belfast Brigade leader, Johnny Adair, Kerr permitted use of Taughmonagh to launch an attack on the Finaghy Road North home of a suspected Provisional IRA Commander, Brian Gillen. The attack never took place however, as the West Belfast Brigade were promptly arrested by the RUC following their departure from the Shankill on route to Taughmonagh. Following his release in 1994, McDonald resumed control of the brigade after Kerr defected to Billy Wright's LVF. Kerr had become disillusioned with the UDA's alignment with the UVF, UDP and PUP, and had created tension by attacking the UVF in the village with slanderous graffiti and giving interviews denouncing the peace process and encouraging a new strategy opposed to peace. McDonald was left to diffuse a potential loyalist feud with the UVF.

On 14 October 1991, the group was responsible for shooting dead Catholic taxi driver, Harry Conlon. Members had made a bogus call to STS taxis in Andersonstown requesting a taxi from the Devenish Arms Inn on Finaghy Road North to the Errigle Inn on the Ormeau Road. After picking them up, he was abducted at gunpoint and forced to drive into Taughmonagh. Later, at 10:17pm, he was found shot dead in his taxi on Finnis Drive. The UDA/UFF then telephoned the BBC and claimed responsibility for the murder.

In June 1997, the son of a murdered UDA member, James Curtis Moorehead, shot dead his father's killer, Robert "Basher" Bates (a UVF member and a Shankill Butchers). As he acted without sanction from leadership, this resulted in the Shankill Road UDA exiling him to Taughmonagh. This resulted in the UVF prowling Taughmonagh in search of him. A feud between the Donegall Pass UVF and the Sandy Row UDA looked imminent as relations severely deteriorated. To avoid a war with the UVF, McDonald negotiated a resolution where the Moorehead would be housed on the edge of Taughmonagh and warned to lay low.

In 2002 and 2003, during a loyalist feud between the UDA's West Belfast Brigade, led by Johnny Adair, and the wider UDA, the Taughmonagh UDA erected a ring of steel around the estate and deployed an air-raid siren which would be set off if "foreign" cars entered the estate. McDonald held a crisis meeting following the shooting of Jim Gray by the LVF, suspecting Adair of being involved. Adair was caught visiting the LVF in Ballysillan immediately after the meeting. When McDonald discovered this, he moved to expel Adair after securing the support of other brigadiers, making Taughmonagh a potential retaliation target for Adair.

In 2007 UDA activity in Taughmonagh made headlines following the 'tarring and feathering' of an alleged drug dealer. In 2016, controversy arose when a number of UDA flags was erected across the estate, including at the entrance to Taughmonagh Primary School and outside Taughmonagh Community Forum Resource Centre. The incident was condemned by the local SDLP Councillor.
