= Queen's Quarter, Belfast =

Area of Belfast, Northern Ireland

Coordinates: 54.585764°N 5.935482°W

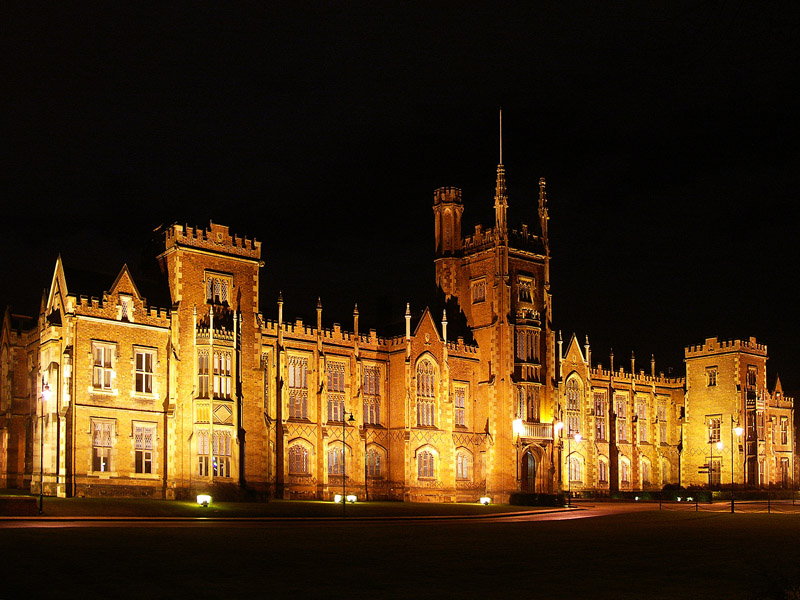
Queen's University Belfast, the quarter's namesake

Queen's Quarter (also known as the University Quarter) is the southernmost quarter in Belfast, Northern Ireland and named after Queen's University Belfast, Northern Ireland's largest university. The Quarter is centred on the Lanyon Building, the University's most prominent building, designed by architect Sir Charles Lanyon, while Botanic Avenue, Stranmillis Road, University Road and Malone Road are the main thoroughfares through the area. The Quarter encompasses a region bounded by the Ormeau Road, the Holylands and Stranmillis Embankment to the east and the Lisburn Road to the west.

== Culture ==
Many cultural events take place in this area of the city, in part because of the presence of the university, and in part because of the choice of venues, including the Whitla, Mandela and Elmwood Halls owned by the University. As well as these inside venues, the Botanic Gardens, serve as an outdoor venue for events such as the Belfast leg of the Tennents T Vital concert. The best known event that takes place in the quarter is the long running Belfast Festival at Queen's, an international arts festival held every November, now in its 46th year.

The Quarter is also home to the Lyric Players' Theatre, the Crescent Arts Centre, the Naughton Gallery at Queen's and Queen's Film Theatre (an art house cinema that hosts the annual Belfast Film Festival). While many popular bands and performers play in the Queen's Students' Union's Mandela Hall and 'Speakeasy' venues.

== Attractions ==
Much of the area is near the Botanic Gardens, a 28-acre (110,000 m^{2}) public park opened in 1828, housing rare plant species in the iconic 'Palm House' (also designed by Charles Lanyon); the park is located close to the Stanmillis Embankment along the River Lagan, which consists of a towpath that runs to the town of Lisburn. Northern Ireland's largest museum, the Ulster Museum, is located in the Quarter adjacent to the Friar's Bush Graveyard, a former monastery and one of Belfast's oldest Christian sites, with graves dating to the time of Saint Patrick.

== Architecture ==
The area is also known for its architecture which includes not only the Lanyon Building, but also Union Theological College (a Presbyterian training college used as the base for the Parliament of Northern Ireland between 1921 and 1932), the main building of Methodist College Belfast and Elmwood Hall (a former Presbyterian Church, now owned by Queen's and used as a concert hall). The main building of Stranmillis College (part of Queen's) was also designed by Charles Lanyon.

== Students ==
Thousands of students from Queen's, as well as other institutions such as the University of Ulster and Belfast Metropolitan College, live in the area which has given rise to a large number of coffee shops, restaurants and pubs which have also made the area popular among tourists. Clear examples of this can be seen in the Stranmillis Village area south of Queen's, and Botanic Avenue to the north of the main campus.

== Images ==
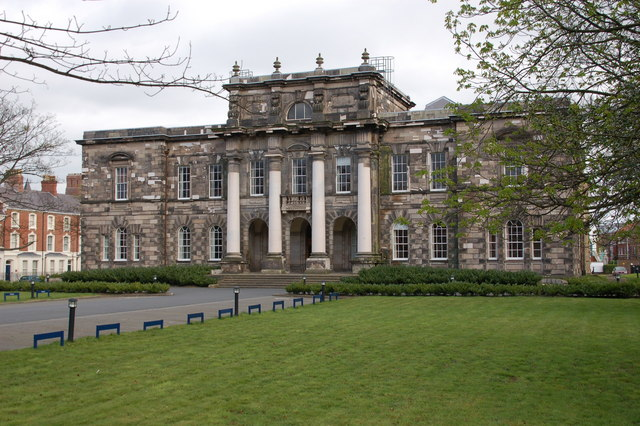
Union Theological College, located on Botanic Avenue.

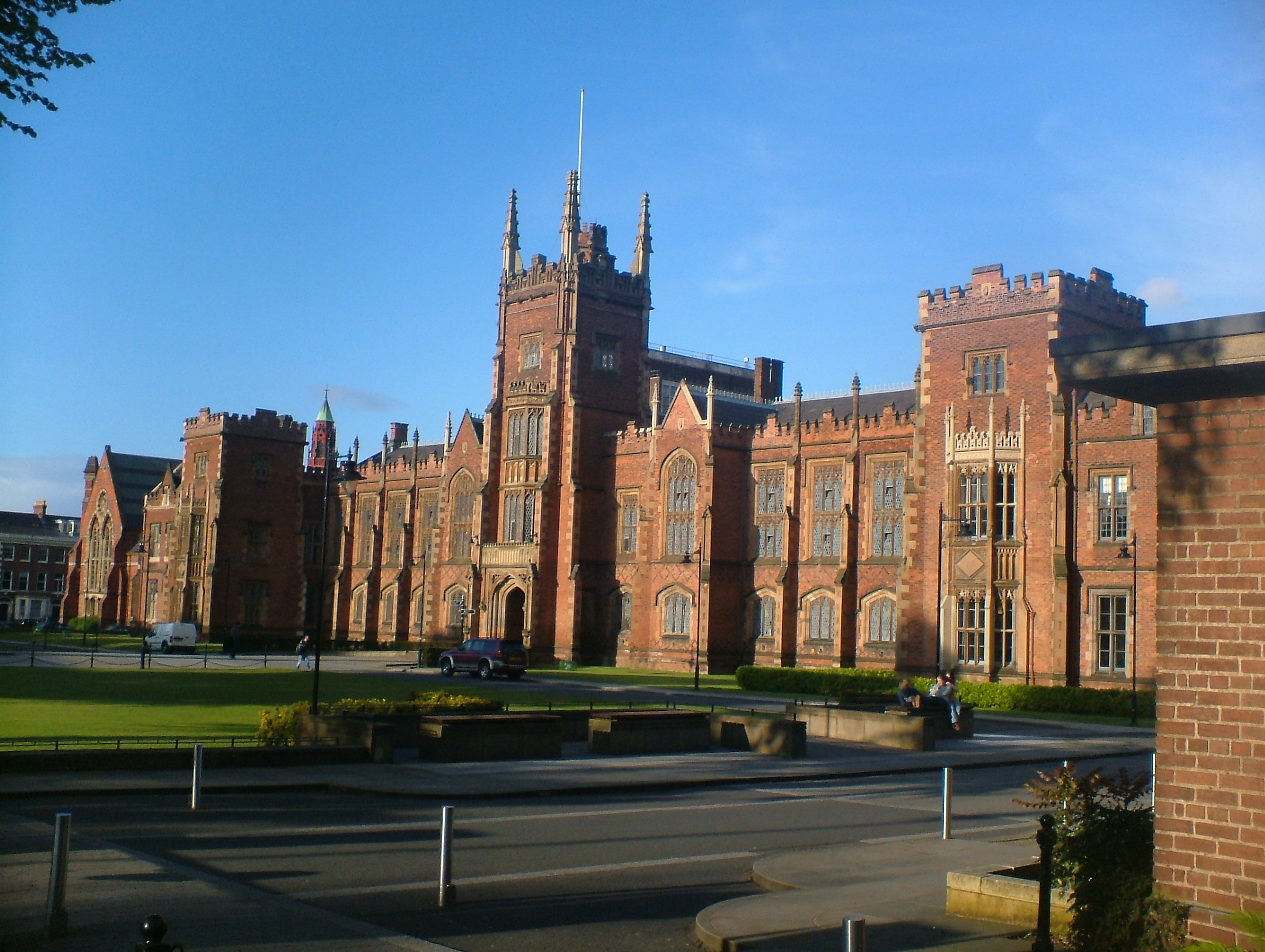
The Lanyon Building, the main building of Queen's University, and centre of Queen's Quarter.

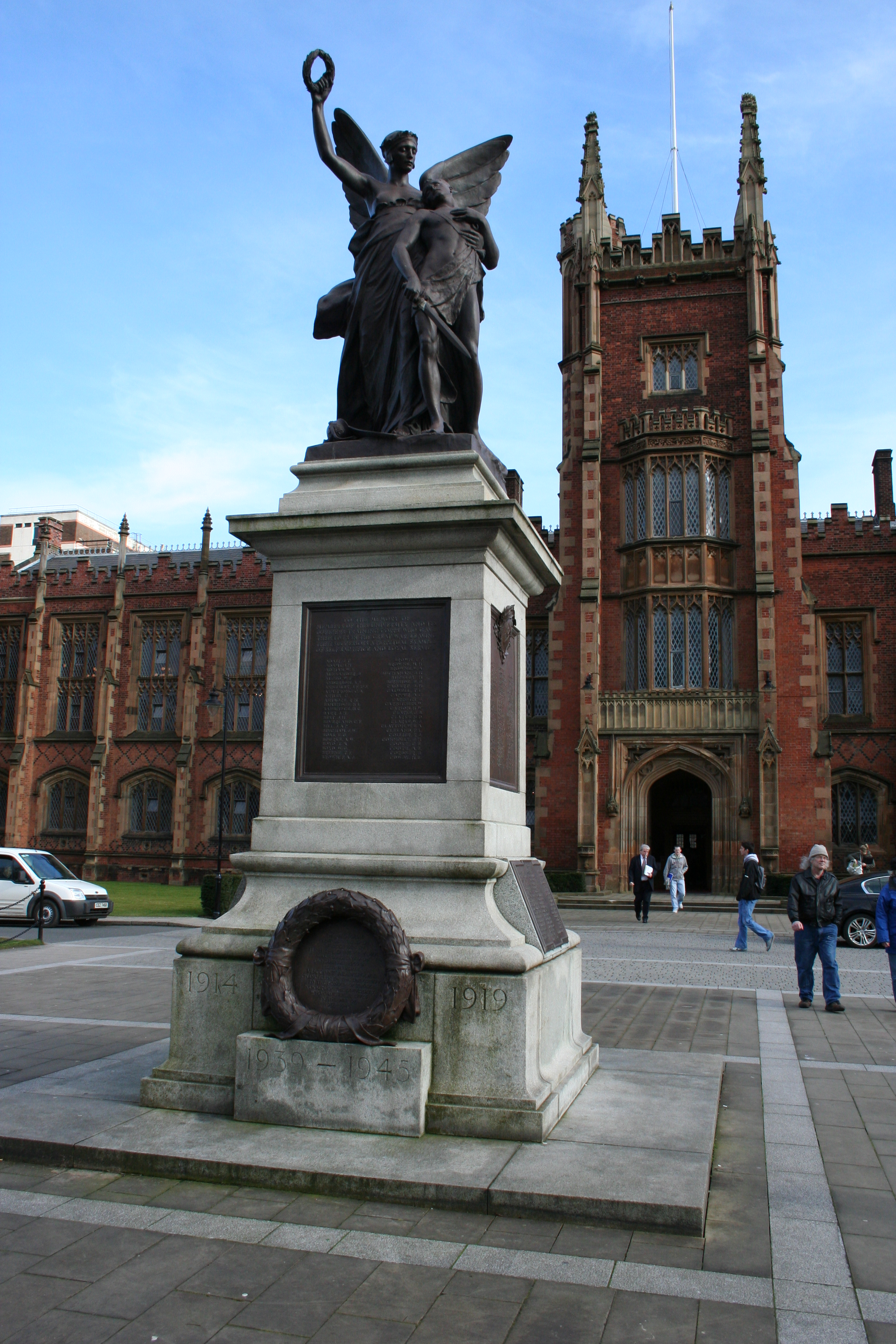
QUB War Memorial, outside main entrance to Lanyon Building.

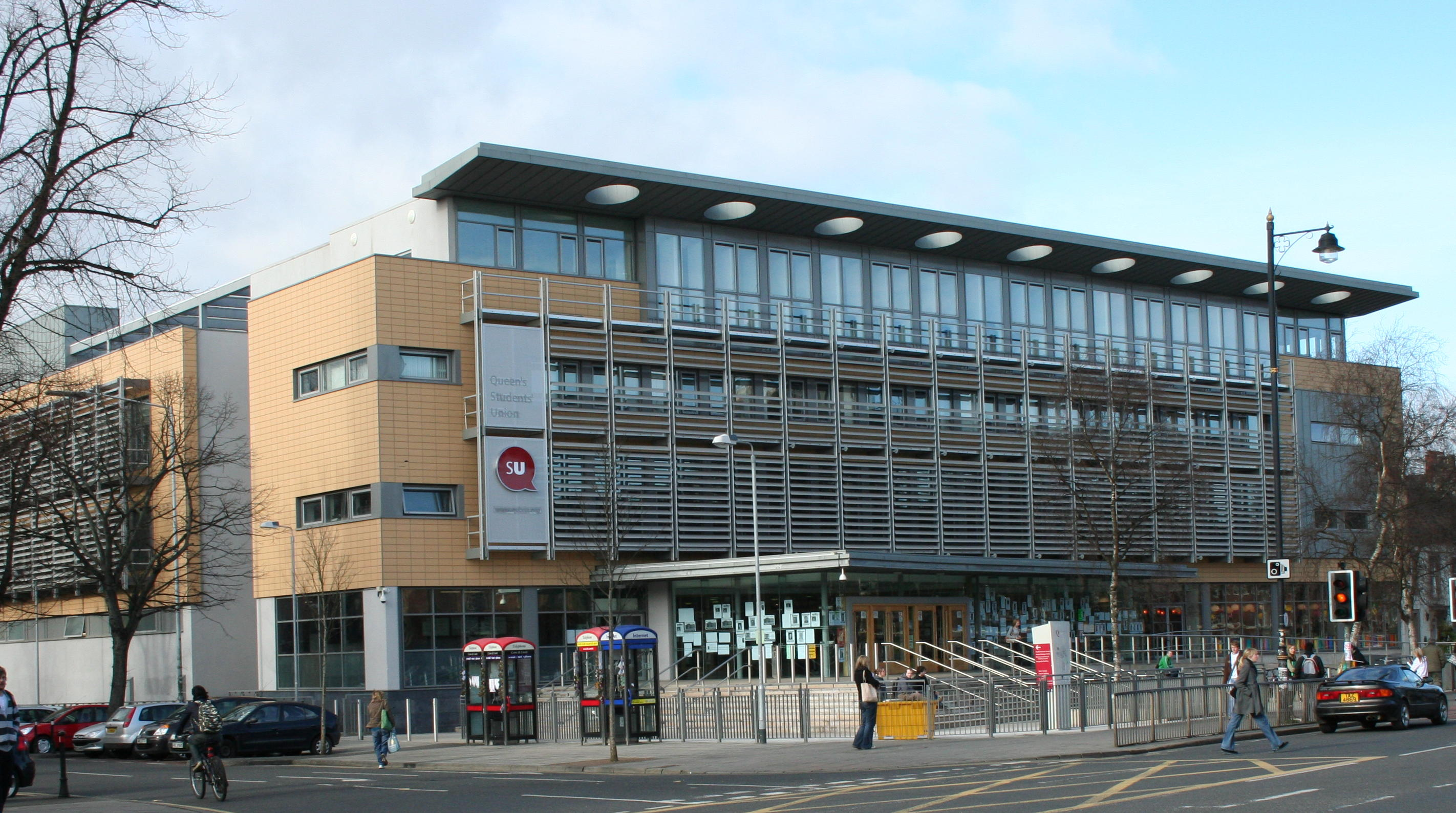
Queen's University Belfast Students' Union

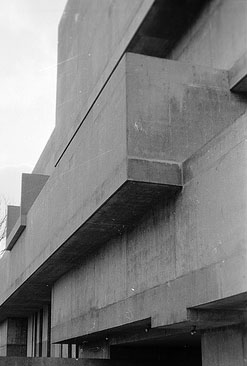
Exterior of Ulster Museum, located on Stranmillis Road and designed by James Cumming Wynne.

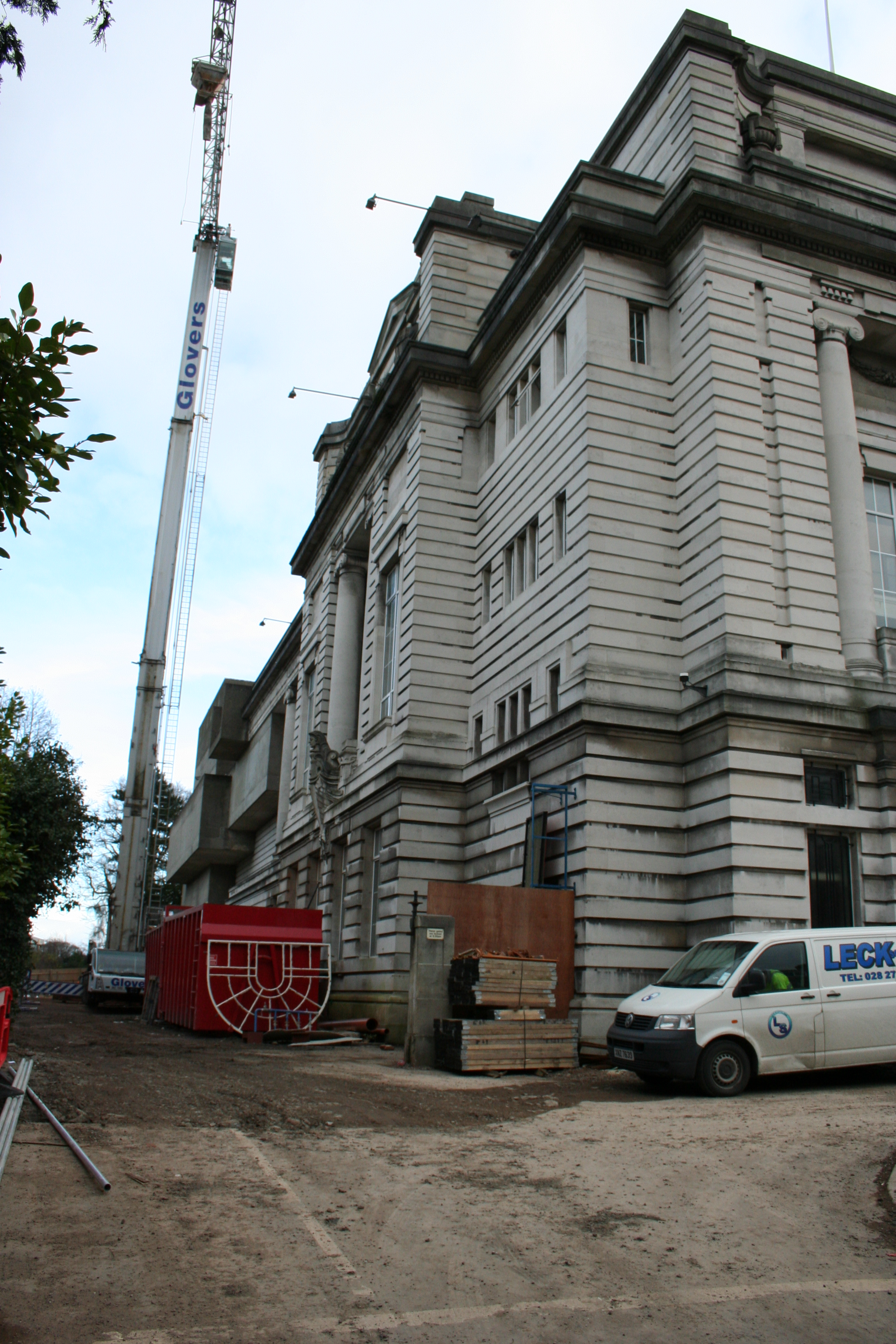
Ulster Museum undergoing refurbishment.

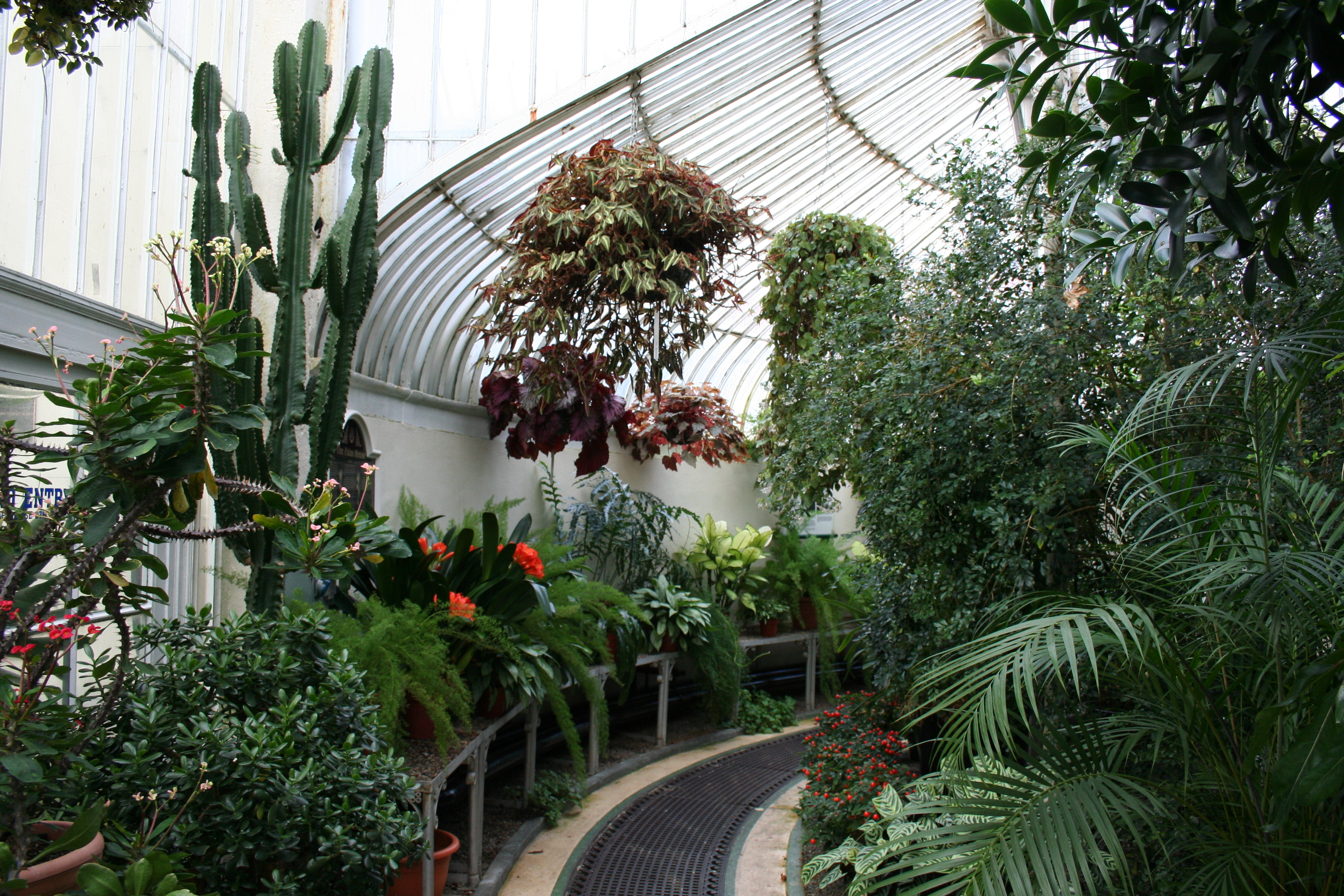
Inside the Botanic Gardens Palm House.

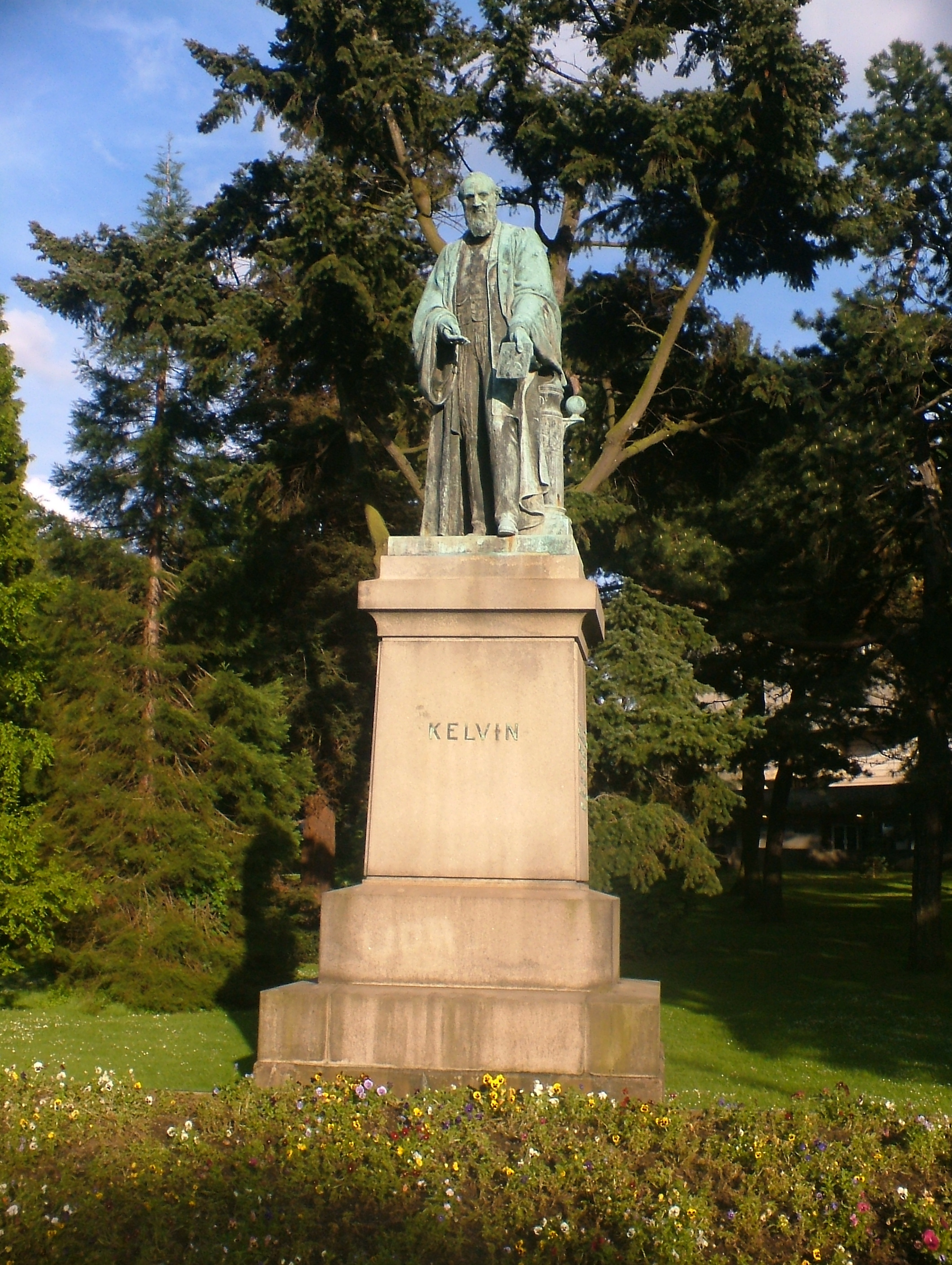
Statue to Belfast-born physicist Lord Kelvin at the entrance to the botanic gardens.

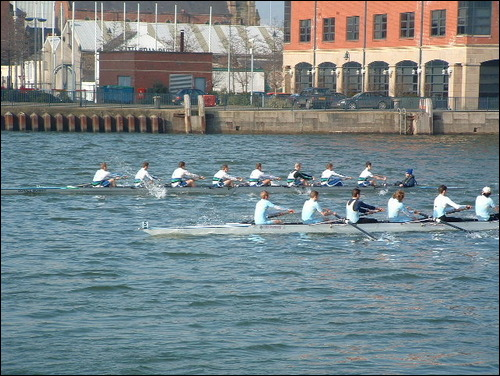
Queen's University Belfast Boat Club based in Stranmillis, racing University College Dublin on the River Lagan.

== See also ==
- Belfast Quarters
