= St John's Church, Belfast =

Anglican church in Belfast, Northern Ireland

Coordinates: 54°34′2.11″N 5°57′0.96″W

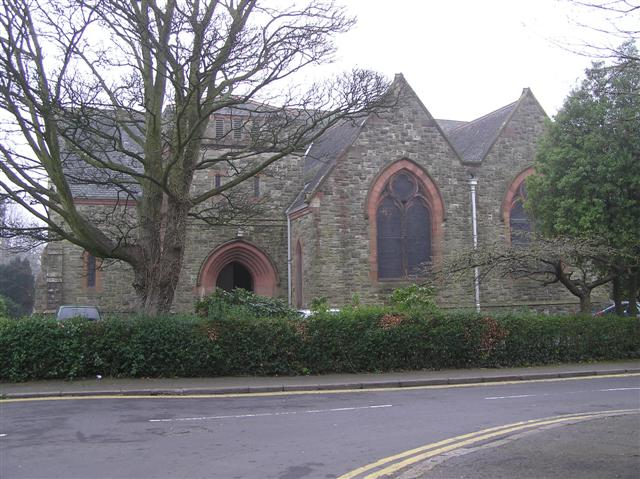
St John's in 2009

St John's Church is a Church of Ireland parish church located on Malone Road in Belfast, Northern Ireland. It is part of the Diocese of Connor. It is a Victorian church built in Gothic style. It was built between 1893 and 1895, the nave was built in 1905. It is a Grade B listed building and was officially listed in 1985.

== History ==
In 1842, an existing St John's Church was built to cater for the needs of a congregation on Malone Road that had gathered in the nearby fields in a temporary church since 1839. Due to the growth of the congregation, it was determined in 1886 that a new church was needed. Prior to construction, there had been consideration for a new Church of Ireland church on Malone Road, Belfast in 1890 with the architect William Batt drawing up proposals for the design. St John's Church was constructed in two phases by Henry Seaver with plans to gradually increase the size in future phrases. This was Seaver's first church project and he was selected because his brother was the rector of the church. The chancel and transepts were constructed first between 1893 and 1895. In the second phase, the nave was built in 1905. It was originally envisaged to include a tower however this was not built due to lack of funds.

The old church building was then given to the Presbyterian Church in Ireland and was demolished in 1968. In 1920, a stained glass window by the artist Wilhelmina Geddes titled "The Leaves of the Tree were for the Healing of the Nations", and inspired by the Book of Revelation, was installed in the church. It gained listed status in 1985.
