= Belfast metropolitan area =

Grouping of council areas in Northern Ireland

Belfast Metropolitan Area
- Metropolitan area
- Location in Northern Ireland
- Coordinates: 54°35′49″N 5°55′48″W
- Sovereign State: United Kingdom
- Constituent Country: Northern Ireland
- District: Belfast; Lisburn; Bangor, County Down; North Down; Newtownabbey; Castlereagh
- County: County Antrim / County Down

Government
  - UK Parliament: Belfast North; Belfast South; Belfast East; Belfast West; Lagan Valley; East Antrim; South Antrim; Strangford; North Down

Area
  - Total: 960 km^{2} (370 sq mi)
- Time zone: UTC+0 (GMT)
  - Summer (DST): UTC-1 (BST (WEST))
- Area code: 028

The Belfast metropolitan area, also known as Greater Belfast, is a grouping of council areas which include commuter towns and overspill from Belfast, Northern Ireland, with a population of 671,559 in 2011 and 704,406 in 2021. The area combines the Belfast, Lisburn, Newtownabbey, North Down, Castlereagh and Carrickfergus districts from before the local government reorganization of 2014. This equates to 37.1% of Northern Ireland's population.

== Overview ==
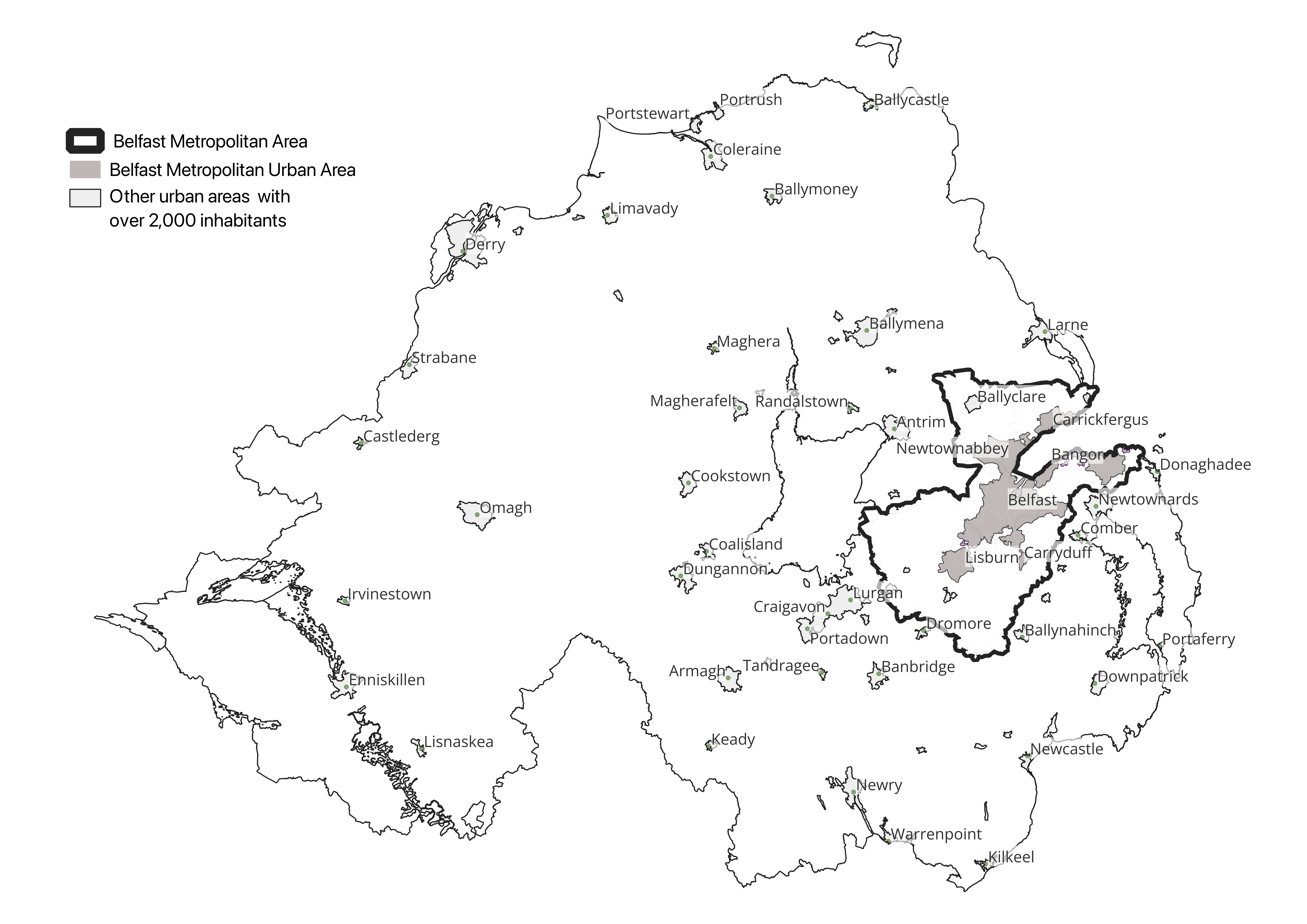
Map of Northern Ireland showing Belfast Metropolitan (Urban) Area

The area was first officially classified as a metropolitan area in the late 1990s when the British government began to prepare for a cohesive plan that would include the Belfast Region. Six local government districts – Belfast, Castlereagh, Carrickfergus, Lisburn, Newtownabbey and North Down, were identified as the key areas within the metropolitan area. The continuous built-up area centred on Belfast, which is contained within these six districts, is defined as the Belfast Metropolitan Urban Area. The Belfast metropolitan urban area had a population of 579,276 in 2001 and a population of 626,339 in 2021, or 89% of the total population of the metropolitan area.

The area is made up of established towns, their overspill and the general conjoining of settlements as Belfast expands. Established towns include Carrickfergus, Bangor, Lisburn and Holywood. Many of these towns were established and important long before Belfast rose to prominence; Carrickfergus, for example, was the Norman capital of the northern part of Ireland until Edward Bruce's defeat in 1318. Bangor had been an important centre of Christianity and learning from its foundation in 555 AD. The recent reclassification of Lisburn as a city does not change its position within the metropolitan area.

A Belfast Urban Area strategic development plan for Belfast and the surrounding area was adopted in 1990 to cover the period up to 2001. This plan was to be superseded by the Belfast Metropolitan Area Plan 2015, to cover the period up to 2035. However, enforcement of this plan was quashed by the Northern Ireland High Court in May 2017, and the Belfast Urban Area plan remains in effect.

Currently the terms Belfast Metropolitan Area and Belfast Metropolitan Urban Area have no official use either in administration or statistical reporting.

== Places in the conurbation ==
| Rank | Urban Area | Population (2001 Census) | Population (2011 Census) | Population (2021 Census) |
|---|---|---|---|---|
| 1 | Belfast urban area | 276,605 | 280,138 | 293,300 |
| 2 | Lisburn urban area | 71,403 | 76,556 | 84,089 |
| 3 | Newtownabbey urban area | 62,022 | 65,646 | 67,599 |
| 4 | Bangor | 58,368 | 61,011 | 64,596 |
| 5 | Castlereagh urban area | 54,636 | 55,857 | 58,762 |
| 6 | Carrickfergus | 27,192 | 27,998 | 28,140 |
| 7 | Holywood urban area | 12,027 | 11,257 | 10,757 |
| 8 | Carryduff | 6,564 | 6,961 | 7,170 |
| 9 | Greenisland | 5,067 | 5,486 | 5,964 |
| 10 | Groomsport & Crawfordsburn | 1,401 | 1,795 | 1,718 |
| 11 | Helen's Bay | 1,356 | 1,385 | 1,547 |
| 12 | Milltown | 1,356 | 1,499 | 1,633 |
| 13 | Seahill | 1,179 | 1,014 | 1,055 |
| Total | Belfast metropolitan urban area | 579,276 | 596,603 | 626,332 |

== 2021 census ==
The demographics of the Belfast Metropolitan Urban Area from the 2021 census are as follows:

- 19.3% were 15 and under, 22.4% were 60 and over
- 48.4% were male, 51.6% were female
- 37.2% were from a Catholic background, 46.8% were from a Protestant background

== 2001 census ==
At the 2001 census, the demographic characteristics of the people living in Belfast metropolitan urban area (BMUA) were as follows:

- 22.0% were aged under 16 years and 19.2% were aged 60 and over
- 47.4% of the population were male and 52.6% were female
- 34.4% were from a Catholic background, 60.9% were from a Protestant background
- 4.3% of people aged 16–74 were unemployed

== Population maps ==
The following maps show religious and national identity distributions from the 2021 census. National Identity responses could include multiple identities.

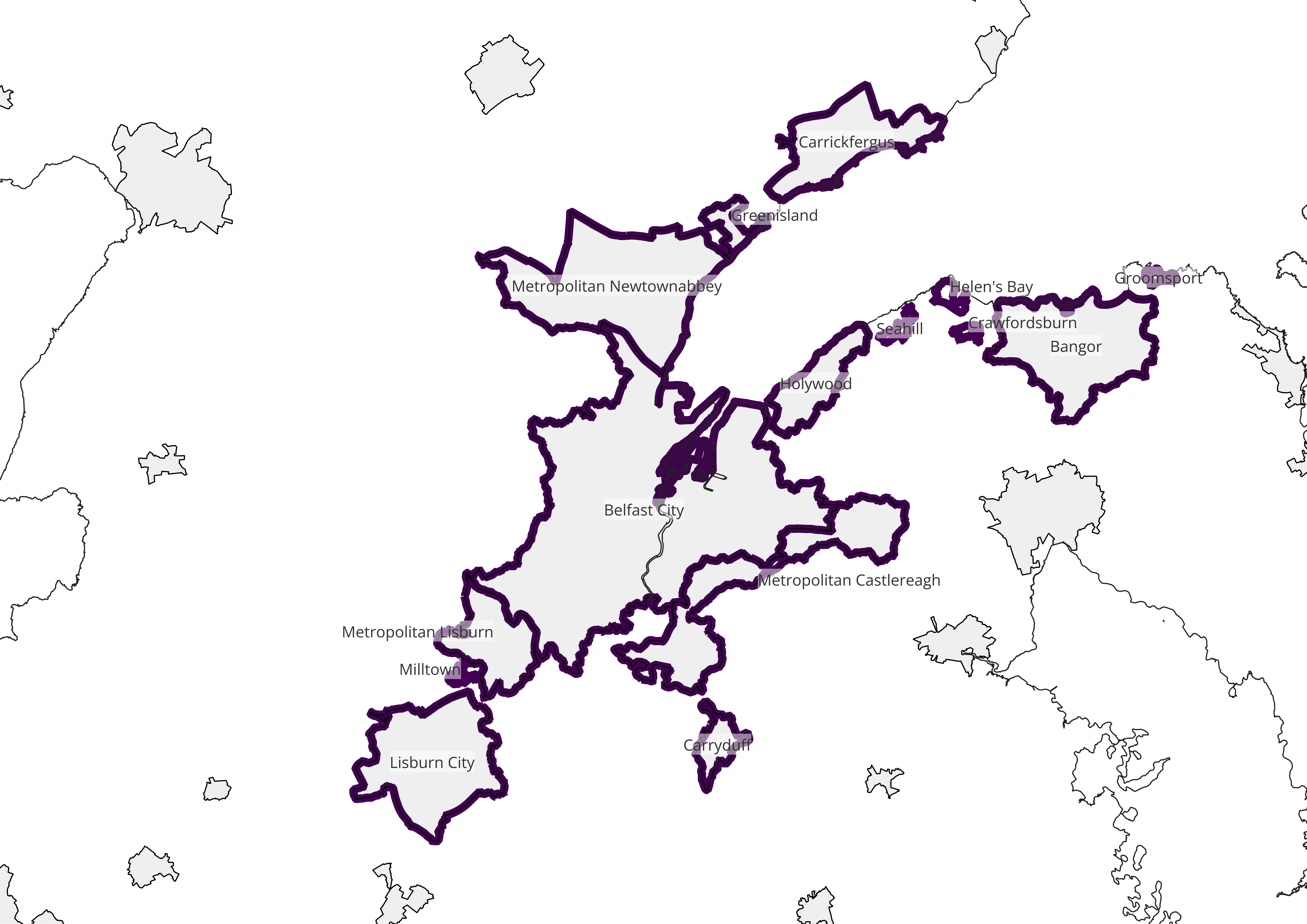
Map showing areas comprising the Belfast Metropolitan Urban Area (2015 settlement boundaries)

Belfast Metropolitan Area 2021 Religious Background

Predominant National Identity from 2021 Census. Combinations that include both British and Irish are excluded. "Other" consists of National Identity responses that don't include Irish, British, or Northern Irish in any combination.

In the 2011 UK Census, the distributions of population, religion, national identity and proportion of immigrants within the Belfast metropolitan area, were as follows.

Population density

Percentage who were Catholic or brought up Catholic

Most commonly stated national identity

Percentage born outside the UK and the Republic of Ireland

== See also ==
- Districts of Belfast
- Greater Dublin
- Derry Urban Area
- Greater Cork
- List of conurbations in the United Kingdom
- Dublin-Belfast corridor
