= List of townlands in Belfast =

The townlands of Belfast are the oldest surviving land divisions in Belfast, Northern Ireland. The city is split between two traditional Counties by the River Lagan, with those townlands north of the river generally in County Antrim, while those on the southern bank are generally part of County Down.

The following is a list of townlands within Belfast city (excluding the suburbs of Newtownabbey, Holywood and Dundonald) and their likely etymologies.

== County Antrim (north bank of the River Lagan) ==
- Ballyaghagan (from Irish Baile Uí Eachagáin 'O'Hagan's townland')
- Ballycollin (from Baile Chollan meaning "townland of the height")
- Ballycullo (from Baile Mhic Cú Uladh meaning "MacCullagh's townland")
- Ballydownfine (from Baile Dhún Fionn meaning "townland of the white fort")
- Ballyfinaghy (from Baile Fionnachaidh meaning "townland of the white field")
- Ballygammon (formerly Ballyogoman, from Baile Ó gComáin meaning "O'Coman's townland") – site of Musgrave Park
- Ballygomartin (from Baile Gharraí Mháirtín, "townland of Martin's enclosed field")
- Ballymagarry (formerly Ballingarry, from Baile an Gharraí meaning "townland of the enclosed field")
- Ballymoney (formerly Ballymeighmoney, from Baile Maighe Muine meaning "townland of the plain of the thicket")
- Ballymurphy (from Baile Uí Mhurchú meaning "Murphy's townland")
- Ballysillan Lower (from Baile na Saileán meaning "townland of the willows")
- Derriaghy (from Doire Achaidh meaning "oak-grove of the field" / from Doire Eachadh meaning "Eochy's oak-grove")
- Dunmurry (from Dún Muirígh meaning "Muiríoch's fort")
- Edenderry (from Éadan Doire meaning "hill-brow of the oak-grove")
- Englishtown (an English name)
- Greencastle (an English name), formerly Cloghcastella (from Cloch Mhic Coisteala meaning "Costello's stone castle")
- Killeaton (from Coill Eatain meaning "Eatan's wood")
- Kilmakee (from Cill Mhic Aoidh meaning "MacKee's burial ground")
- Lagmore (from Lag Mór meaning "the great hollow")
- Legoniel or Ligoniel (from Lag an Aoil meaning "hollow of the limestone")
- Low Wood (an English name), formerly Listollyard (from Lios Tulaí Airde, "fort of the high hillock")
- Malone Lower and Malone Upper (from Maigh Luain meaning "Luan's plain")
- Old Park (an English name)
- Poleglass (from Poll Glas meaning "the green hollow")
- Skegoneill (formerly Skeggan Earl, from Sceitheog an Iarla meaning "the earl's little thorn bush")
- Tom of the Tae-End (a Scottish name, the term given to the skin a haggis is stuffed into, possibly named by a Scottish settler due to its size and shape)

== County Down (south bank of the River Lagan) ==
- Ballycloghan (from Baile Clocháin meaning "townland of the stepping stones")
- Ballydollaghan (from Baile Uí Dhúlacháin meaning "O'Dollaghan's townland") – site of Hydebank
- Ballyhackamore (from Baile an Chacamair meaning "townland of the mud flat")
- Ballyhanwood (from Baile Sheanóid meaning "Henwood's townland")
- Ballylenaghan (from Baile Uí Leannacháin meaning "O'Lenaghan's townland")
- Ballymacarrett (from Baile Mhic Gearóid meaning "MacGarrett's townland")
- Ballymaconaghy (from Baile Mhic Dhonnchaidh meaning "MacDonaghy's townland")
- Ballymaghan (from Baile Uí Mhiacháin meaning "O'Meehan's townland")
- Ballymisert (formerly Ballymagher, from Baile Machaire meaning "townland of the plain") – site of Ashfield school
- Ballynafoy or Ballynafeigh (from Baile na Faiche meaning "townland of the lawn") – site of Ormeau Park
- Ballynavally (formerly Ballyomulvally, from Baile Uí Mhaolbhallaigh meaning "O'Mulwally's townland")
- Ballyrushboy (from Baile Rois Buí meaning "townland of the yellow wood")
- Braniel (from Broinngheal meaning "white-fronted place")
- Breda (from Bréadach meaning "broken/fragmented land") – site of Belvoir Park
- Carnamuck (from Ceathrú na Muc meaning "quarterland of the pigs")
- Castlereagh (from Caisleán Riabhach meaning "grey castle") – former site of Castle Clannaboy
- Cregagh (from Creagaigh meaning "rocky place")
- Galwally (from Gallbhaile meaning "foreigners' townland")
- Gilnahirk (formerly Edengillnahirk, from Éadan Ghiolla na hAdhairce meaning "hill-brow of the horn bearer")
- Gortgrib (from Gort Cirb, "field of the trenches") – site of Our Lady and St Patrick's College, Knock
- Killeen (from An Coillín meaning "the little wood")
- Knock (formerly Knock Columkill, from Cnoc Cholm Cille, "Colm Cille's hill")
- Knockbreckan (from Cnoc Bhreacáin meaning "Breacán's hill")
- Knocknagoney (from Cnoc na gCoiníní meaning "hill of the rabbits")
- Lisnasharragh (from Lios na Searrach meaning "ringfort of the foals")
- Multyhogy (from Muilte Sheoigigh meaning "Joy's mills")
- Queen's Island (an English name - named after Queen Victoria), formerly Dargan's Island, named after WIlliam Dargan
- Strandtown (an English name), formerly Ballimachoris (from Baile Mhic Fheorais, "McCorish's townland")
- Tullycarnet (formerly Tullycarnan, from Tulaigh Charnáin meaning "hillock of the little cairn")

== See also ==
- List of townlands in County Antrim
- List of townlands in County Down
