= Library Quarter, Belfast =

Neighborhood of Belfast

The Library Quarter, sometimes referred to as Scotch Quarter and Press Quarter, is the area of Belfast City Centre, Northern Ireland, located around Belfast Central Library on Royal Avenue. The Library Quarter is bounded by Royal Avenue, Donegall Street, Carrick Hill and North Street. Other important buildings in the area include those previously occupied by the two main regional newspapers, the Belfast Telegraph and the Irish News. They both moved their operations to other premises. This quarter is now considered part of the larger Smithfield and Union Quarter, Belfast.
