= Smithfield and Union Quarter, Belfast =

Smithfield and Union is one of the quarters of Belfast, Northern Ireland, established by Belfast City Council in the 21st century. Initially designated the Smithfield Market and Library quarter, the current name was adopted in 2011. Based around the north of Belfast City Centre it extends from North Street to Frederick Street and is bounded by Royal Avenue/York Street and Carrick Hill/Millfield. It houses Belfast Central Library and two of the main daily newspapers The Irish News and The Belfast Telegraph.

== Area ==
Smithfield and Union contains Smithfield Market, a shopping area that dates back to the nineteenth century, and Clifton Street Poor House as well as Donegall Street Congregational Church (now occupied by the Redeemer Central church) and St Patrick's Catholic Church. Smithfield and Union also houses the recently restored St Patrick's National School which was the first Catholic National School in Belfast.

The art deco Bank of Ireland is located on the junction of Royal Avenue and North Street. The Frames building (also known as The Library House) is a former warehouse and now operates as a public house, this building has now been listed by the Environmental and Heritage Service and is located in Little Donegall Street.

The area contains entertainment venues such as the Front Page (Donegall Street) which consistently premieres many local bands, it also is home to McElhattons, one of Belfast's traditional bars. The Kremlin Complex which includes the Union Street Bar is also a major attraction in Smithfield and Union.

Linen House Backpackers hostel which has accommodation for 130 guests is based in Kent Street. This is the only hostel which is actually located in Belfast City centre.

Smithfield and Union contains many of Belfast's major historic sites including Clifton Street's historic cemetery which contains two of the largest famine graves in Ireland as well as being the final resting place of Henry Joy McCracken who was one of the main leaders of the United Irishmen's rebellion of 1798. William Drennan who created the description of Ireland as the "Emerald Isle" is also buried here.

The University of Ulster has announced plans to relocate its main campus from Jordanstown to its site in Smithfield and Union as part of a £250 million plan which will relocate approximately 13,000 students in the city centre.
