= Holyland (Belfast) =

Area of Belfast, Northern Ireland

The Holylands, The Holy Land or The Holyland is a residential area of inner-south Belfast, Northern Ireland. Composed of a series of streets behind The Queen's University of Belfast near to the River Lagan, the area has been dubbed 'the Holyland' from its street names: Jerusalem Street, Palestine Street, Damascus Street, Carmel Street and Cairo Street. The boundaries of the Holyland are generally considered to be the area between University Street, the Ormeau Road, the River Lagan, Botanic Gardens and Queen's. Originally home to many working class families, the area now has a high proportion of students, with many reports of anti-social behaviour.

== History ==
The Holyland street network was built up to its present layout in the 1890s by Belfast's oldest firm of property consultants, Brown McConnell Clark. Sir Robert McConnell, a devout Christian Victorian developer and a previous unionist Lord Mayor of Belfast, was part of one of the founding families of the firm. Along with a builder friend, James Rea, Sir Robert McConnell visited Palestine and Egypt. When he later developed this area, he named the streets after the places they had visited (Carmel, Damascus, Cairo, Jerusalem and Palestine) and they became known as 'the Holyland', after the region around the Middle East's Holy Land.

== Population ==
The demographic makeup of the Holyland has dramatically changed in recent years. This is due to a number of reasons: the expansion in student numbers at Queen's University; a subsequent insufficient availability of University accommodation; significant investment by private landlords and rising house prices; and the attraction of living in south Belfast. All have increased student numbers living in the Holyland. This has transformed the area’s population from initially Protestant to mainly working class Catholic families to the current level of over 90% student and young worker occupation. In one square kilometre of Belfast, there are an estimated 7,000 students living. 60% are from the University of Ulster.

=== Anti-social behaviour ===
These shifts in student numbers have led to an increase in anti-social behaviour by a minority of students. This in turn has intensified friction with the permanent Holyland community population resulting in an increased number of complaints to both local universities. Student overcrowding in houses of multiple occupancy (HMOs) and poor community infrastructure has also meant an increase in a wide range of petty crimes. There has been increased media attention on the Holyland area over the last few years, most notably on the BBCNI Spotlight current affairs television programme, which highlighted these problems of student anti-social behaviour.

In February 2005, in response to these issues, the University of Ulster and Queen's University launched its Student Awareness Campaign, using a specifically commissioned illustration accompanied with the question "Do You Turn into A Monster After Dark?" The campaign was fully supported by both students' unions. The Campaign's aim was to make a direct appeal to students "to respect their neighbours and help create conditions were everyone can live in peace".

In January 2006 a team of community safety wardens were appointed to work in the Holyland area, in a novel approach to issues such as anti-social behaviour and community development. The initiative was launched by Belfast City Council and government agencies, the Police, the city's universities and colleges and other relevant bodies. At a meeting in 2009, it was reported that safety wardens deal with more than one thousand incidents of anti-social behaviour each year. The pilot ended in June 2009, and the scheme was extended to include other areas of Belfast.

St. Patrick's Day 2009 saw further disturbance in the area, with the police making twelve arrests. Five people, four of whom were students, were subsequently charged with riotous behaviour and assaulting police. In March 2021 police issued many fines to people having parties in breach of COVID regulations, and some parties spilled out into the street.

Statistics revealed at local policing board meetings throughout 2009 illustrate that levels of burglary, car crime and violent assaults continue to rise in the area despite increased police patrols. CCTV has been introduced in the area under a pilot scheme monitoring street disturbance.

Many solutions have been proposed to the problem. In 2019, Adam McGibbon, former Vice President of Queen's University Students' Union, proposed that the authorities should regulate the private rented sector and compulsorarily purchase homes for social housing, providing much-needed affordable housing and reducing the student density in the area. In 2020–2021, Queen's University started fining students for their off-campus behaviour.

A comedy film The UnHolylands, by Paddy Duffy, concerns partying students. Filmed and set in the Holylands, it was due to be released in November 2024. James Nesbitt has a minor part.
