= Market Quarter, Belfast =

Area of Belfast, Northern Ireland

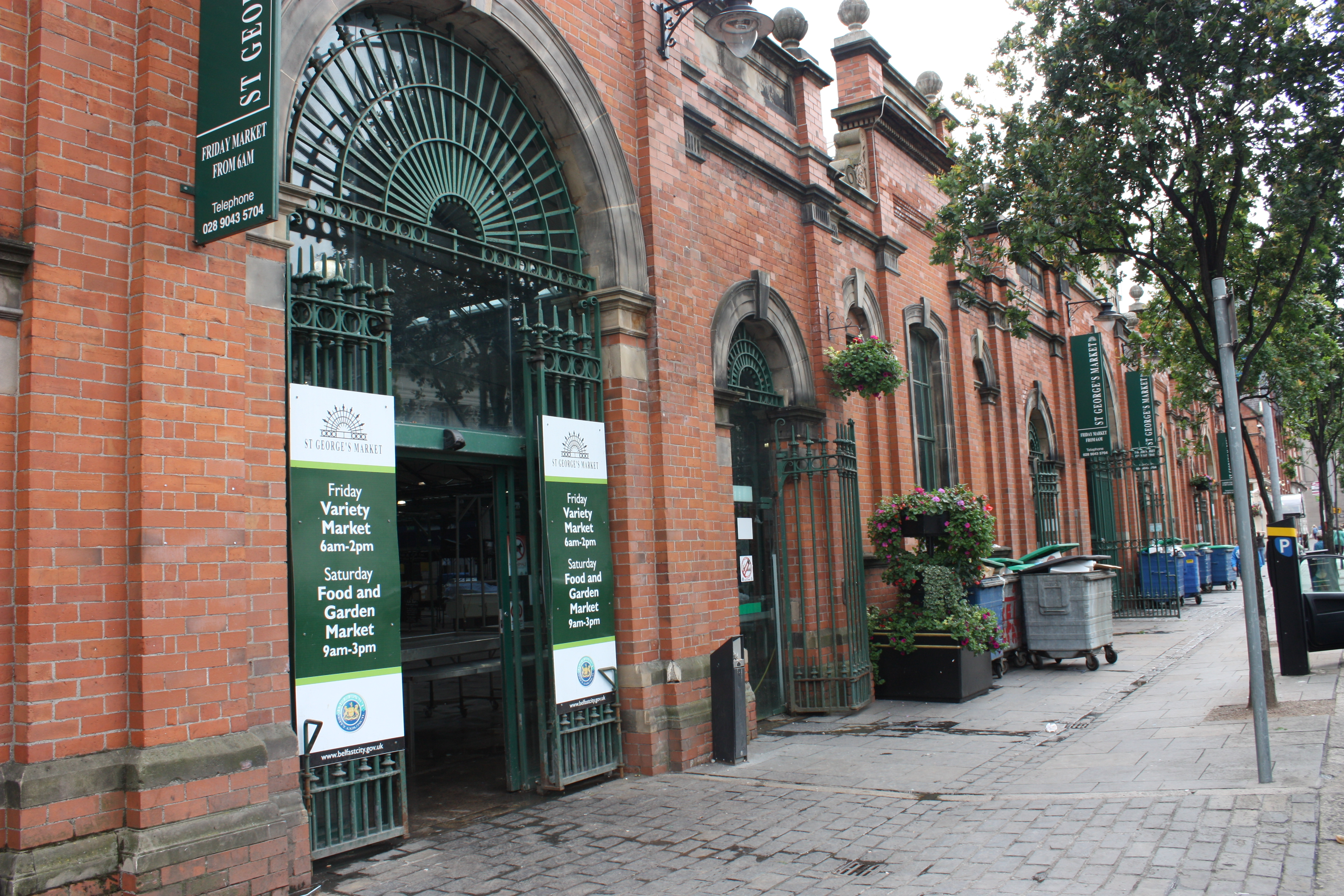
St George's Market, July 2010

The Market Quarter is an area of Belfast, Northern Ireland, featuring St George's Market. While the first market on this site dated back to 1604, the present-day St George's Market was built between 1890 and 1896. Today, the market is open on Friday, Saturday, and Sunday, with locals shopping for fresh produce and tourists sampling foods from hundreds of vendors.

St George's Market is separated by East Bridge Street from The Market, an area of inner-city housing, which itself is adjacent to a vacant site, formerly the city's Haymarket, and Lanyon Place railway station. It also includes The Waterfront precinct, a conference and concert hall, and the Hilton Hotel.
