= Stranmillis =

Suburb in Belfast, Northern Ireland

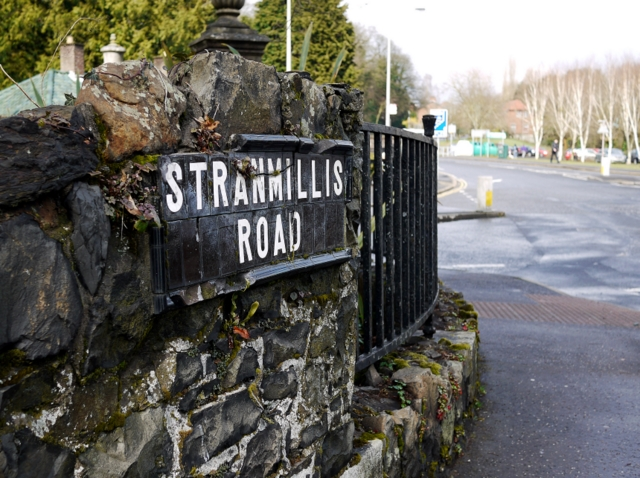
Street sign outside Stranmillis College.

Stranmillis (from Irish an Sruthán Milis) is an area in south Belfast, Northern Ireland. It is also an electoral ward for Belfast City Council, part of the Laganbank district electoral area. As part of the Queen's Quarter, it is the location for prominent attractions such as the Ulster Museum and Botanic Gardens. The area is located on Stranmillis Road, with Malone Road to the west and the River Lagan to the east. Its name, meaning "the sweet stream" in Irish, refers to the Lagan, whose waters are still fresh at this point, before becoming brackish as the river flows onward toward its mouth in Belfast Lough.

Stranmillis Road begins at the junction of University Road, Malone Road and College Gardens, heading uphill and southwards past Friar's Bush Graveyard and a small shopping district, before descending towards the River Lagan. The route then swings to the west around the outside of Stranmillis College and uphill again, before rejoining the Malone Road. The north end of Stranmillis Road contains many shops and restaurants, while the south end of the road is mainly housing.

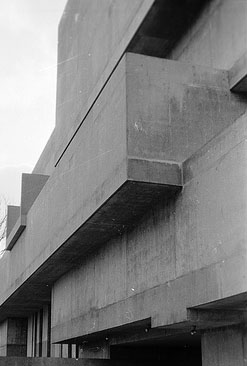
Exterior of Ulster Museum facing onto the Botanic Gardens; designed by James Cumming Wynne.

The Malone and Stranmillis Historic Urban Landscape featured on the 2010 tentative list of sites proposed for addition to the List of World Heritage Sites of the United Kingdom, as an area of architectural interest featuring examples of the Arts and Crafts Movement.

== History ==
In the 9th or 10th century A.D. a rath was built on the bank of the Lagan. The site is one of Belfast's best surviving ringforts and now lies in the grounds of Stranmillis College.

In 1603 Sir Arthur Chichester was granted expansive lands in Ulster, including all of the land west of the Lagan from Carrickfergus to Dunmurry, and the site of the future City of Belfast. In 1606 he leased his Stranmillis lands for 61 years to Moses Hill, who built a plantation castle. This was described in the Report of the Plantation Commissioner around 1611 as being located at a place called "Stranmellis". The castle guarded a crossing point of the Lagan, close to today's King's Bridge. The site of the castle has been traced to some Victorian farm buildings in the centre of the current estate, and historian George Benn stated during the 19th century that the ruins of the building existed "almost within living memory". Hill also built a second castle at Malone, on the site of what is now Malone House.

Before the lease expired, the Hill family moved out of Stranmillis and the lands reverted to the Chichester family to become the Countess of Donegall's Deer Park. In 1683 Richard Dobbs described it as "a very fine Park, well stored with Venison and in it a Horse Course of Two Miles". A Donegall document defines it as "Stranmellis Park".

== Places of interest ==
Several well-known Belfast landmarks are located in the area, including:

- Botanic Gardens, a 28-acre (110,000 m^{2}) public park opened in 1828, including some rare species in the 19th-century Palm House and Tropical Ravine.
- The Ulster Museum is situated adjacent to the park and has been located in Stranmillis since 1929.
- The Lyric Theatre moved to its current location on the bank of the Lagan in 1968. The theatre was fully redeveloped between 2007 and 2011.

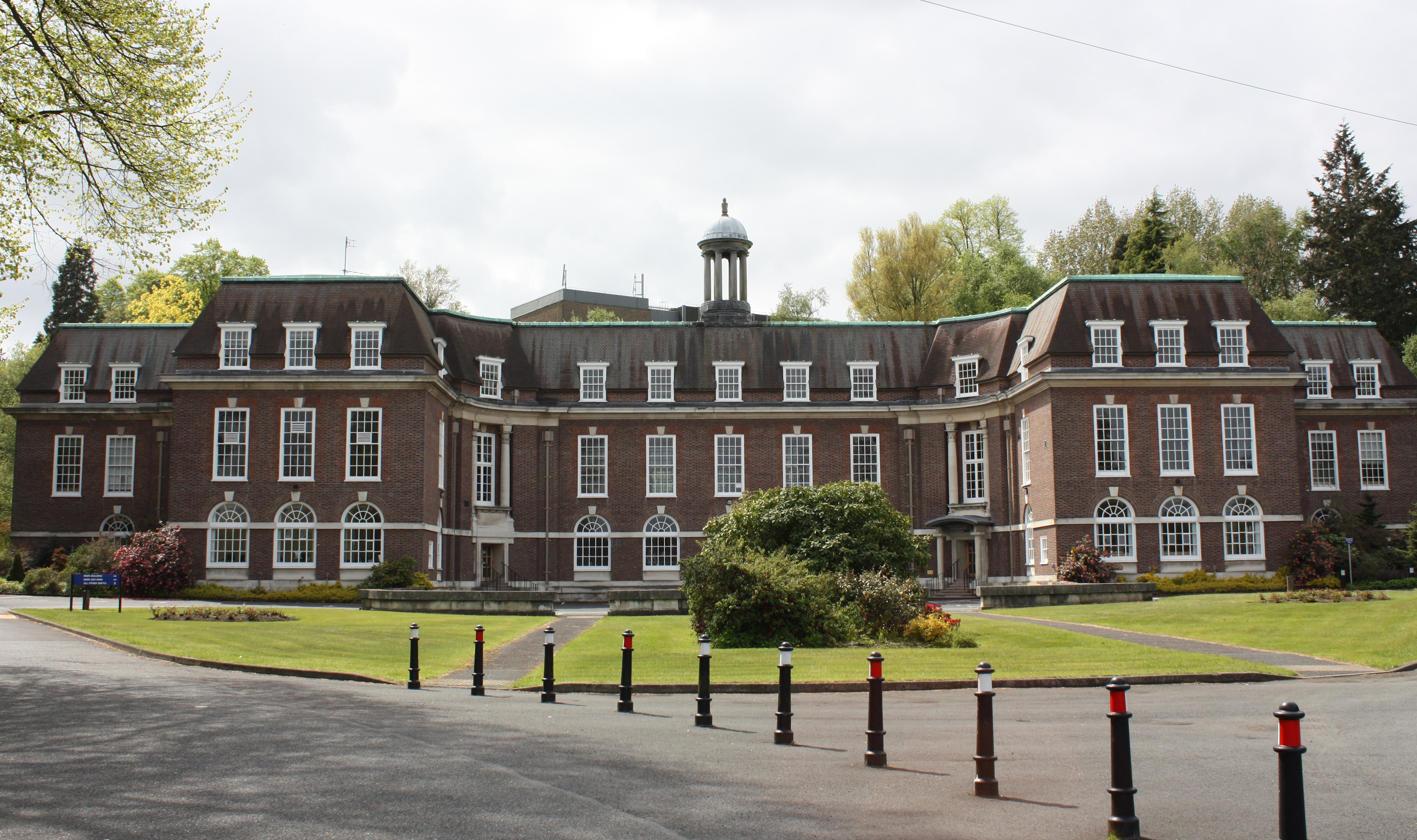
Stranmillis University College

=== Stranmillis College and Queen's University ===
Stranmillis University College is located at the midway point of the road. Established as a teaching college in 1922, it is now a constituent college of Queen's University.

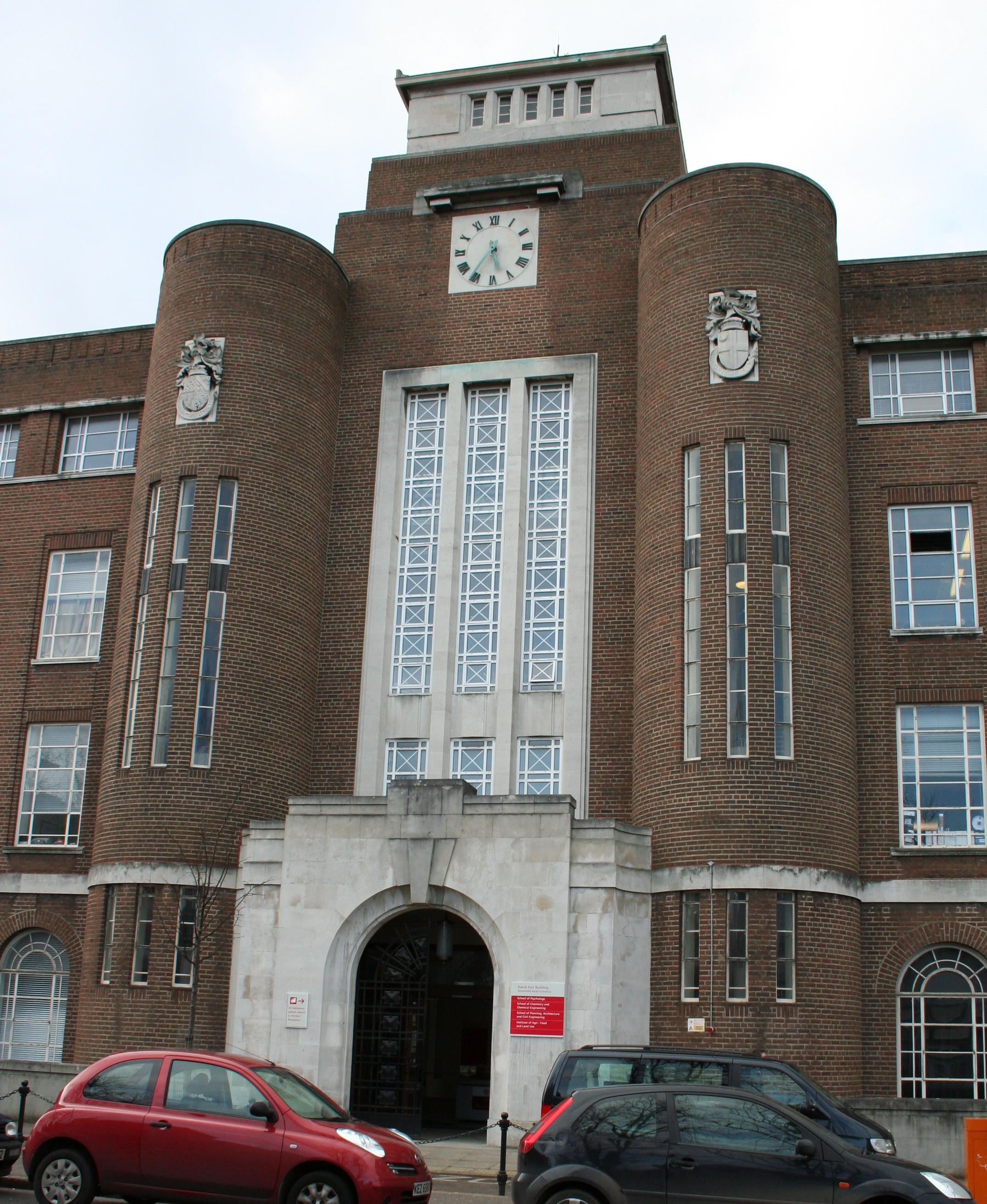
Entrance to David Keir Building

Several prominent Queen's University buildings are located on Stranmillis Road, including the David Keir Building and the multi-storey Ashby Building, while the University's Physical Education Centre is located close to the river and adjacent to the Botanic Gardens.

=== Friar's Bush Graveyard ===
Friar's Bush Graveyard is one of the oldest Christian sites in Belfast, with some graves dating to the early mediaeval period. The site is marked on a map of 1570. In the 18th century when Catholics were forbidden to build a church in Belfast they met at Friar's Bush which was then outside the town boundary, for Holy Communion. Mass ceased in 1769.

=== River Lagan ===
The Stranmillis Embankment along the Lagan marks the eastern edge of the Stranmillis area. A towpath runs from here along the river, south to the city of Lisburn and north as far as Jordanstown. On Lockview Road where Stranmillis meets the river, a number of boating organisations including Queen's University Belfast Boat Club have access to the water.

== World Heritage Site nomination ==
In 2010 the Malone and Stranmillis Historic Urban Landscape was added to the tentative list of sites proposed for addition to the List of World Heritage Sites of the United Kingdom as an area of architectural interest featuring examples of the Arts and Crafts Movement. The site was not put forward for the UK shortlist in 2011.

== See also ==
- Stranmillis Primary School
