= Malone Road =

Road in Northern Ireland

Coordinates: 54.5740°N 5.9462°W

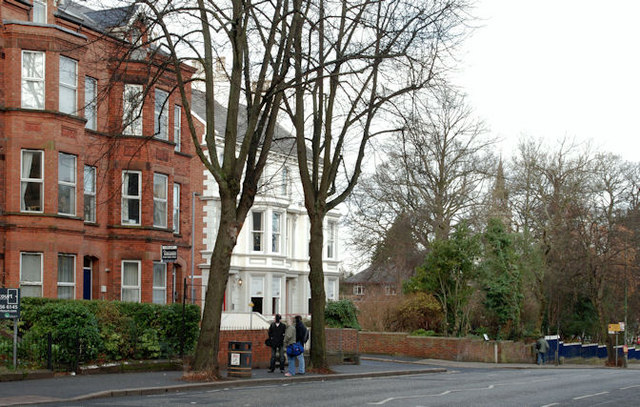
Malone Road

The Malone Road (from Irish Maigh Lón 'plain of lambs') is a radial road in Belfast, Northern Ireland, leading from the university quarter southwards to the affluent suburbs of Malone and Upper Malone, each a separate electoral ward. The road runs parallel to the Lisburn Road and is linked by over a dozen side streets, while at its northern end, the Stranmillis Road rejoins the Malone Road to form University Road, which in turn joins with the Lisburn Road to become Bradbury Place. Most of the road is in the BT9 postcode district.

At the southern end of the Malone Road lies Malone House, a mansion in the late Georgian style. The house is now maintained by Belfast City Council.

The residential streets leading off the Malone Road and Upper Malone Road are known for their high property prices, and the area is therefore a byword in Northern Ireland for affluence.

Adjoining is Malone Lower Neighbourhoods incorporating Stranmillis Wharf, The Holylands, Donegall Pass, Queen's Quarter, Sandy Row, Stranmillis, The Village, Windsor areas which have a larger and very diverse population in a more built up area with the close proximity to the Lisburn road nd city centre, many properties range from the 1930s up to newer development s most recently built in 2025 https://streets.openalfa.co.uk/malone-lower

== History ==
=== The Troubles ===
On 25 August 1971 during the Troubles Henry Beggs, a 23-year-old Protestant civilian, was killed by an Irish Republican Army (IRA) bomb placed at the Northern Ireland Electricity Service office on Malone Road. In June 1979 Private Alexander Gore of the Ulster Defence Regiment (UDR), also 23, was killed in an IRA gun attack at the Malone Road army barracks.

The Malone Road army base was closed and sold to private developers in 2003.

== Education ==
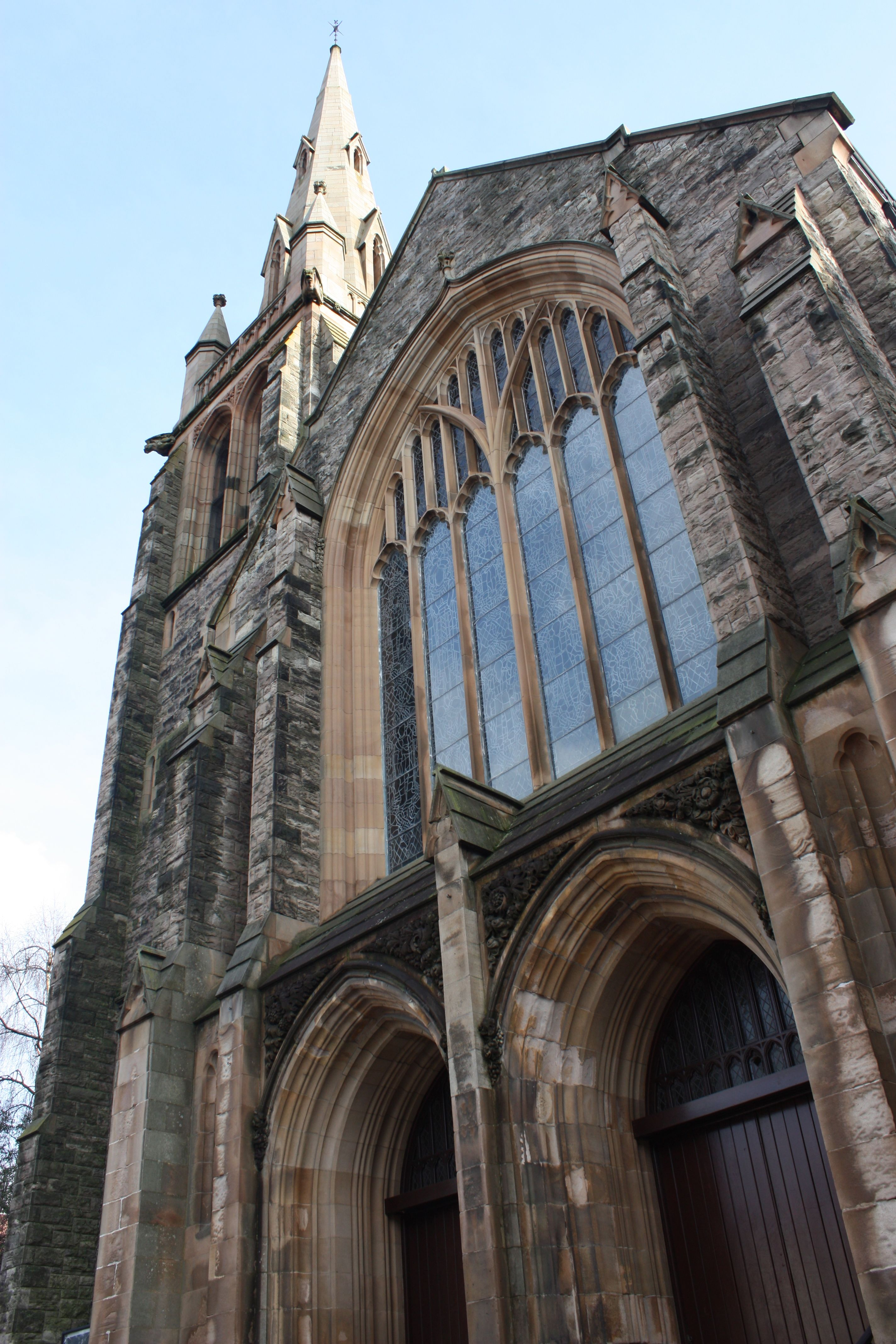
Fisherwick Presbyterian

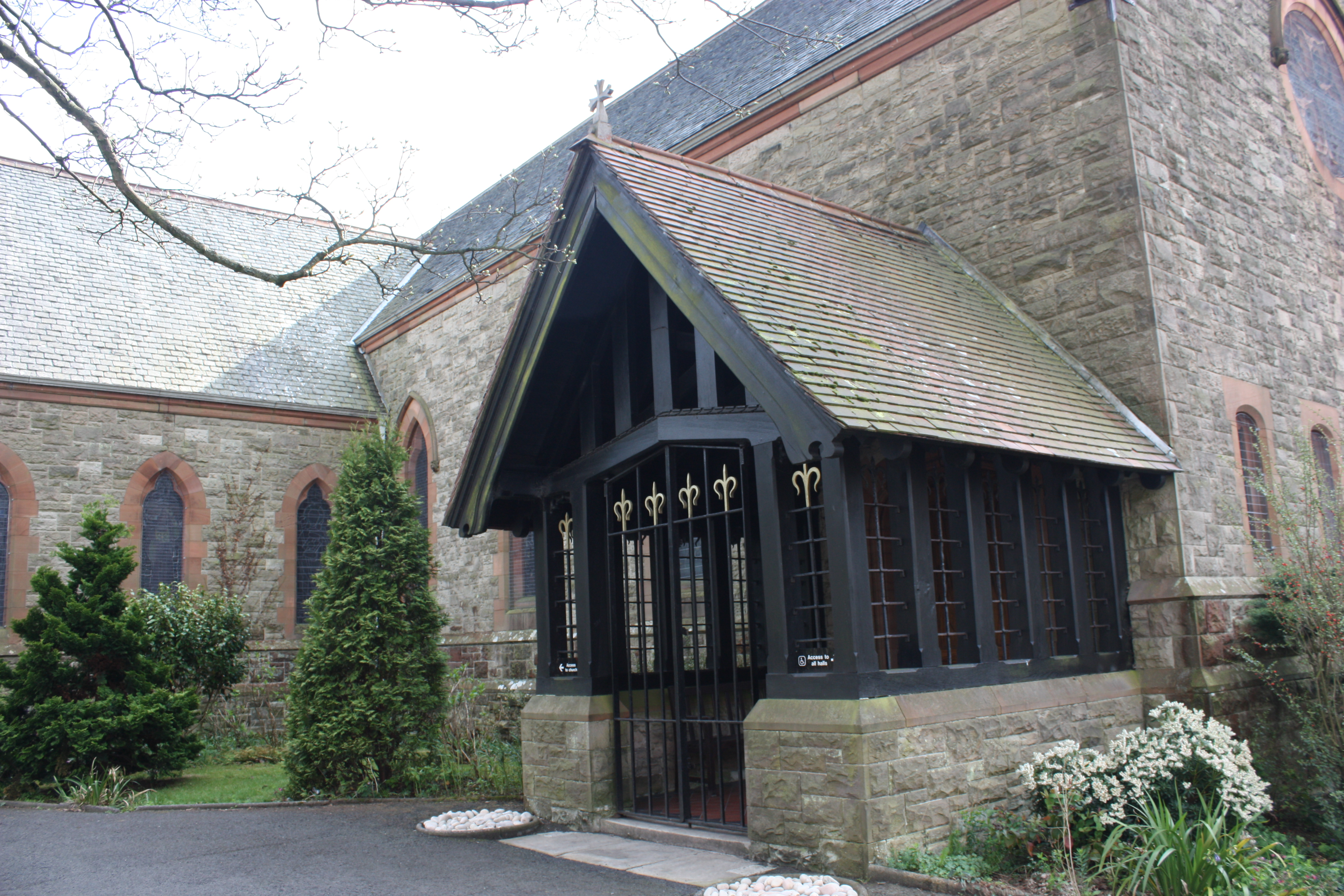
St John's Anglican

The district contains two of Belfast's best known grammar schools. At the northern end of the road, number 1 Malone Road is Methodist College Belfast, while further south lies Victoria College, Belfast. The district also hosts Queen's Elms Village, the main halls of residence for students from Queen's University Belfast, housing over 1,000 students.

Inchmarlo, the preparatory department of the Royal Belfast Academical Institution, is also located in the area.

== Sports ==
The Malone Road is home to St Brigid's Gaelic Athletic Club founded in 1998 within the St Brigids Parish. St Brigids GAC the biggest club in South Belfast having won numerous County Titles in both codes of Gaelic Football and Hurling from junior age groups up to Senior Level. Aquinas Football Club were also founded in the area. Off the Malone Road are many private sports clubs, the YMCA grounds at Bladon, Belfast Harlequins and Methody sports ground at Deramore Park, the Royal Belfast Academical Institution playing fields at Osborne Park and Bladon and the Queen's University Belfast playing fields at Upper Malone.

== Churches ==
There are five churches in Malone, including St Brigid's Roman Catholic Church, Fisherwick Presbyterian Church, St John's Church Malone Anglican Church; McCracken Memorial Presbyterian Church and Malone Presbyterian Church on the corner of Balmoral Avenue and Lisburn Road. This church has a notable stained glass window, back lit so that it shines outward at night and installed in 2000 when The Revd. Derek John Boden, M.A., B.D was Minister there.

== Flora and fauna ==
The wild plants, "weeds", are listed and discussed in Urban Flora of Belfast by Beesley and Wilde, who noted that the local residents keep their gardens relatively weed-free. In the area Scrophularia nodosa (Common Figwort), Digitalis purpurea (Foxglove) and Silene dioica (Red Campion) were noted in an old lane off the Malone Park. Epipactis helleborine (Broad-leaved Hellborine), an orchid, was spreading up New Forge Lane and Allium triquetrum (Three-cornered Garlic) was recorded from Cranmore.

== Notable residents ==
The Malone Road area of Belfast has been home to many notable and historical people. From Moyses Hill, who received a 61-year lease in 1606 John Eccles was the first known resident of Cranmore House, later John Templeton lived on the road. Malone Road has also been the home of restaurateur and chef Paul Rankin, actress Séainín Brennan, and television presenters Rose Neill, Donna Traynor, Jim Fitzpatrick, Paul Clarke and Mark Carruthers also in the Malone area.

It was satirised in two novels by Gareth Russell, later adapted into a trilogy of plays, and by comedian Paddy Rafferty in his television show and successful stand-up act.
