= List of people with surname Cusack =

Cusack is a surname. Notable people with the surname include:

== A–M ==
- Adam Cusack (1601–1681), Irish landowner, barrister and judge
- Alex Cusack (born 1980), Irish cricketer
- Andrew Cusack (fl. 17th century), Irish colonial administrator
- Ann Cusack (born 1961), American actress
- Arthur Cusack (1919–2000), Australian swimming coach
- Billy Cusack (born 1966), Scottish judoka
- Bryan Cusack (1881–1973), Irish politician
- Carmen Cusack (born 1971), American actress
- Carole M. Cusack (born 1962), Australian historian of religion
- Catherine Cusack (born 1968), British actress
- Catherine Cusack (politician) (born 1963), Australian politician
- Colin Cusack (born 2000), British rower
- Conor Cusack (born 1979), Irish sportsperson
- Cyril Cusack (1910–1993), Irish actor
- Dave Cusack (born 1956), English footballer
- Declan Cusack (born 1988), Irish rugby union player
- Dick Cusack (1925–2003), American actor
- Dónal Óg Cusack (born 1977), Cork hurling goalkeeper
- Dymphna Cusack (1902–1981), Australian author and playwright
- Evelyn Cusack (born 1964), Irish weather presenter
- Francis Peter Cusack (1919–1990), New Zealand labourer and character
- George Cusack, 17th-century Irish pirate
- Gregory Cusack (born 1943), American politician
- Henry Edward Cusack (1865–1954), Irish mechanical engineer
- Jack Cusack (1890–1973), American professional football manager
- James Cusack (born 1990), British broadcaster and DJ
- James William Cusack (1788–1861), Irish surgeon, President of the RCSI
- Jim Cusack (1930–2019), Australian rules footballer
- Joan Cusack (born 1962), American actress
- Joe Cusack (1868–1930), American football player and US Army officer
- John Cusack (born 1966), American actor, producer, and screenwriter
- John Cusack (Australian politician) (1868–1956), Australian politician
- John Cusack (hurler) (1925–2002), Irish hurler
- John F. Cusack (1937–2014), American politician
- Johnny Cusack (1927–2020), Cavan Gaelic footballer
- Joyce Cusack (born 1942), American politician
- Maddy Cusack (1995–2023), English footballer
- Maggie Cusack, Academic and university president
- Margaret Anna Cusack (1832–1899), Irish nun and religious sister
- Mark Cusack (born 1984), American politician
- Mary Ellen Cusack (1833–1900), Plant and insect collector
- Maureen Cusack (1920–1977), Irish actress
- Michael Cusack (Gaelic Athletic Association) (1847–1906), Founder of the Gaelic Athletic Association
- Michael Cusack (rugby union) (born 1984), Scotland international rugby union player
- Michael Cusack (animator) (born 1990), Australian animator and voice actor
- Michael Cusack (cyclist) (born 1955), Irish cyclist and author

== N–W ==
- Neil Cusack (born 1951), Irish distance runner
- Niamh Cusack (born 1959), Irish actress
- Nicholas Cusack, Roman Catholic bishop
- Nicholas Cusack (Jacobite) (born 1638), Irish Jacobite politician
- Nick Cusack (born 1965), English footballer
- Nicole Cusack (born 1966), Australia netball international
- Pádraig Cusack (born 1962), Irish theatre producer
- Peter Cusack (rugby league) (born 1977), Australian rugby league footballer
- Peter Cusack (musician) (born 1948), English artist and musician
- Pud Cusack, American sound engineer
- Ralph Cusack (1916–1978), Irish-born barrister and English High Court judge
- Ralph Cusack (painter) (1912–1965), Irish artist, horticulturist and writer
- Ralph Smith Cusack (1821–1910), Chairman of Irish railway company
- Robert Cusack (born 1950), Australian swimmer
- Robert Cusack (judge), Irish judge
- Sean Cusack (1925–2014), Republic of Ireland footballer
- Sean Cusack (rugby league) (born 1966), Scotland international rugby league footballer
- Sinéad Cusack (born 1948), Irish stage, television and film actress
- Sorcha Cusack (born 1949), Irish actress
- Stephen Cusack (biologist) (born 2000), British biologist
- Steve Cusack (1876-1952), American baseball umpire
- Ted Cusack (1910–1982), Australian rules footballer
- Thomas Cusack (politician) (1858–1926), American politician
- Thomas Cusack (bishop) (1862–1918), American clergyman
- Thomas Cusack (Irish judge) (1490–1571), Anglo-Irish judge and statesman
- Tom Cusack (born 1990), Australian rugby union player
- Walter de Cusack (c. 1270 – 1334), Irish judge and military commander

== See also ==
- Cusick
