= Murder of Ann Ogilby =

1974 UDA murder in Northern Ireland

Ann Ogilby murder
- Part of the Troubles
- Victim Ann Ogilby
- Location: Warwick's Bakery, 114 Hunter Street, Sandy Row, south Belfast, Northern Ireland
- Date: 24 July 1974; 16.00 BST
- Attack type: Punishment beating
- Weapons: Bricks, sticks
- Deaths: 1 Protestant civilian
- Perpetrator: Sandy Row women's UDA unit

The murder of Ann Ogilby, also known as the "Romper Room murder", took place in Sandy Row, south Belfast, Northern Ireland on 24 July 1974. It was a punishment killing, carried out by members of the Sandy Row women's Ulster Defence Association (UDA) unit. At the time the UDA was a legal Ulster loyalist paramilitary organisation. The victim, Ann Ogilby, a Protestant single mother of four, was beaten to death by two teenaged girls after being sentenced to a "rompering" (UDA slang term for a torture session followed by a fatal beating) at a kangaroo court. Ogilby had been having an affair with a married UDA commander, William Young, who prior to his internment had made her pregnant. His wife, Elizabeth Young, was a member of the Sandy Row women's UDA unit. Ogilby had made defamatory remarks against Elizabeth Young in public regarding food parcels. Eight weeks after Ogilby had given birth to their son, the women's unit decided that Ogilby would pay for both the affair and remarks with her life. The day following the kangaroo court "trial", they arranged for the kidnapping of Ogilby and her six-year-old daughter, Sharlene, outside a Social Services office by UDA man Albert "Bumper" Graham.

A group of UDA women then followed the minibus which took Ogilby and Sharlene to a disused bakery in Hunter Street, Sandy Row; this empty building had been converted into a UDA club and "romper room". After Sharlene was sent by Graham to a shop to buy sweets, Ogilby was made to sit on a bench and a hood placed over her head. Two teenagers, Henrietta Cowan and Christine Smith, acting on the orders previously given them by the unit's leader, Elizabeth "Lily" Douglas, proceeded to savagely beat Ogilby to death with bricks and sticks. As Ogilby screamed and pleaded for her life, Sharlene, who had already returned from the shop, overheard her mother being beaten and killed. A later autopsy report revealed that Ogilby had sustained 24 blows to the head and body, 14 of which caused a "severe fracture to the bulk of the skull".

Within weeks of the killing, ten women and one man were arrested in connection with the murder. They were convicted in February 1975. All but one, a minor whose sentence was suspended, went to prison. The murder caused widespread revulsion, shock and horror throughout Northern Ireland and remained long in the public psyche even at a time when bombings and killings were daily occurrences. The Ann Ogilby murder was investigated by the Historical Enquiries Team (HET) which was established by the Police Service of Northern Ireland (PSNI) to investigate the most controversial killings carried out during the Troubles.

== Events leading to the murder ==
=== Ann Ogilby ===
Ann Ogilby (born c.1942/1943 and sometimes referred to as Anne Ogilby), a young Protestant woman, moved to Belfast from Sion Mills, County Tyrone on a date that has not been firmly established. (Note: Author David M. Kiely gives her age as 17 at the time of her move which would make the year approximately 1959/1960,[ref:"Elizabeth Douglas: the Sandy Row executioner". Belfast Telegraph. David Kiely. 1 June 2005] however RUC detective Alan Simpson contradicts this date in his book Murder Madness: True Crimes of The Troubles by stating that Ann Ogilby arrived in Belfast "some six years" before her murder, making the year of her arrival 1967 or 1968. [ref: Murder Madness: True Crimes of The Troubles, p.34]) She was one of 13 children from a poor family. Described as a "very attractive girl with dark-brown silky hair and blue eyes", and a slender figure, she embarked on a transient lifestyle, regularly changing her address and employment. The jobs she held were mostly low-paid positions in offices and shops, and she was often evicted for failing to pay the rent. Her striking good looks made her popular with men. In about 1968 she became a single mother, having been made pregnant by a married British soldier stationed in Northern Ireland who had abandoned her and their child after he was transferred to another duty station. She started socialising with a rough crowd, and in August 1972, she met William Young, a married high-ranking member of the then-legal Ulster Defence Association (UDA) with whom she fell deeply in love and began living with him in south Belfast. (Note: The UDA was formed in September 1971 as an umbrella organisation for the many loyalist vigilante groups known as "defence associations". It was structured along military lines with brigades, battalions, companies, platoons and sections. Although Andy Tyrie was the overall commander, the brigadiers enjoyed a large degree of autonomy and regarded their own territories as "their personal fiefdoms". [ref: Loyalists. Peter Taylor. p.199]. The UDA remained legal until 10 August 1992 when it was proscribed by the British Government.) Young came from the loyalist Donegall Pass area and was a local UDA commander. He told Ogilby his marriage had already broken up and that his divorce hadn't been finalised. Ogilby by that time had three children by two different men: Sharlene, and twins Stephen and Gary. The boys had been put up for adoption after their birth, leaving only the eldest child, her daughter Sharlene, in her care.

When Young was interned inside the Maze Prison in 1973, she often visited him. He complained that his estranged wife, Elizabeth, never sent him food parcels, despite her having been provided with money by the Loyalist Prisoners' Association (LPA). The LPA was unaware of the Young couple's estrangement. The delivery of food parcels by women to imprisoned members was a long-established practice by the UDA and a "particular source of pride for the organisation". Ogilby was required to make up and send him the food parcels herself which she felt was an imposition as these had to come out of her own money, although she was almost destitute. When Ogilby mistakenly repeated Young's complaint in a Sandy Row pub, the local Sandy Row women's UDA unit (of which Elizabeth was a member) overheard her words and became violently angry, especially as Elizabeth was able to prove that she had been sending her husband food parcels. Ogilby's comments were regarded by the women's UDA as a grievous insult to its integrity, as the unit was responsible for the assembly and distribution of the parcels. The group was already antagonistic due to Ogilby's affair with Young, and her defamatory remarks only added fuel to their wrath. The women considered her behaviour in public immoral, ostentatious, and extremely unconventional because she frequented clubs and pubs on her own instead of with female friends which was the custom in Sandy Row. Furthermore, they believed her loud, outspoken and maverick personality, status as an unmarried mother, and habit of what was described by a local as "flaunting herself" was a cultural infraction that brought shame upon their community.

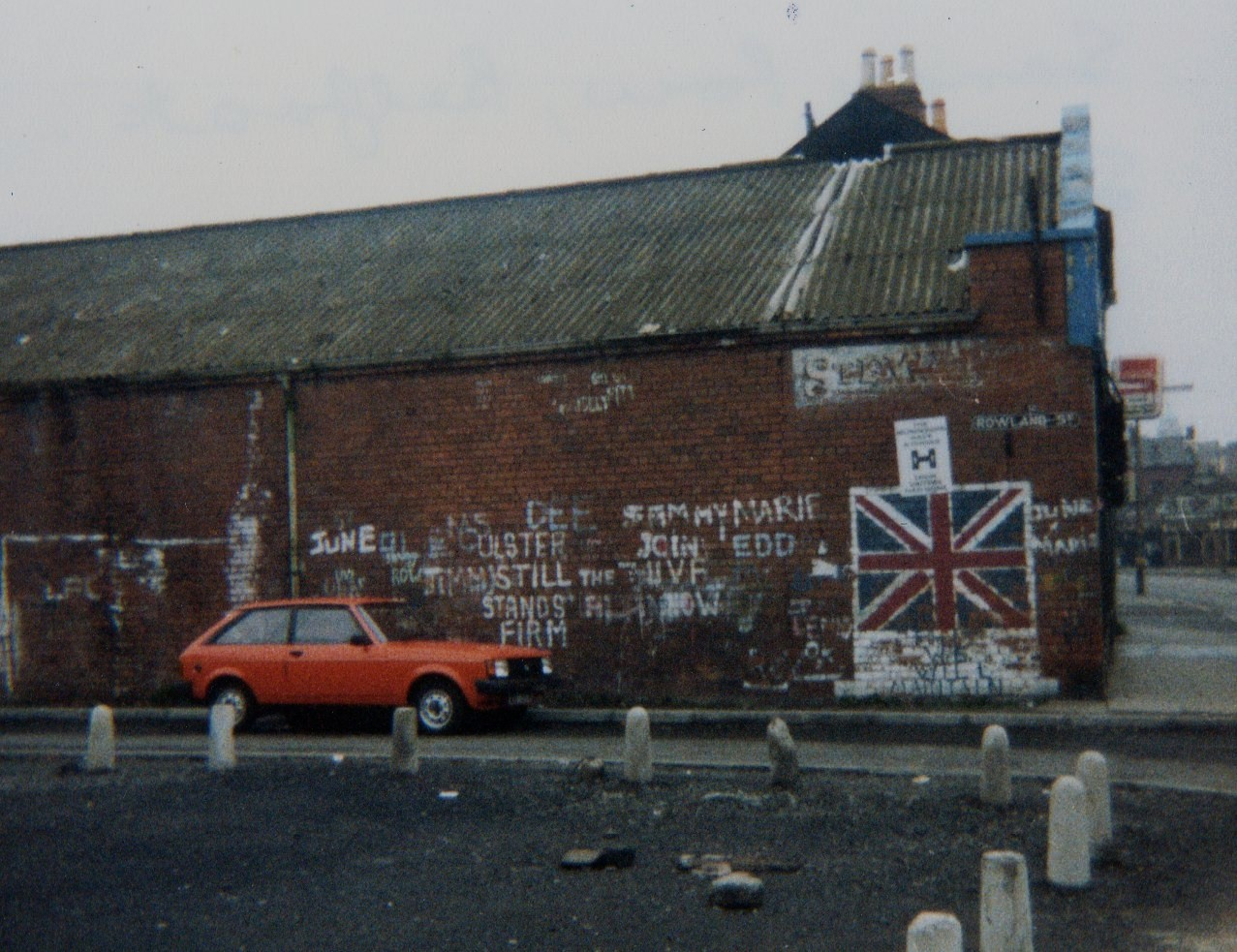
Sandy Row, south Belfast, where loyalist paramilitaries have always had a strong presence since the early days of the Troubles

=== Social milieu ===
Sandy Row is an Ulster Protestant working class enclave just south of Belfast city centre closely affiliated with the Orange Order whose 12 July parades are elaborate events made notable by the traditional Orange Arches erected for the occasion. Prior to late 20th-century urban redevelopment beginning in the 1980s, rows of 19th-century terraced houses lined the streets and backstreets that branched off the main commercial thoroughfare. Loyalist paramilitaries have had an active presence there since the early days of the Troubles. By 1974, the violent ethno-political conflict waged between the Protestant unionists and Catholic Irish nationalists was six years old and showed no sign of abating; bombings, shootings, sectarian murders, intimidation, security alerts and military patrols were a daily feature of life in Belfast and the rest of Northern Ireland. There was no family in working-class areas of Belfast that remained unscathed by the Troubles or insusceptible to the effects of the disorder, tension and carnage. The Provisional Irish Republican Army's bombing campaign had escalated sharply in 1972 and began to increasingly target Belfast city centre, often with lethal consequences such as on Bloody Friday on 21 July 1972, when the Provisional IRA exploded 22 bombs across the city, killing nine people and injuring over 100. This led to the erection of steel gates, manned by the British Army, thus effectively putting a security cordon or "ring of steel" around the city centre, which resulted in both Protestants and Catholics retreating further into segregated neighbourhoods, which rapidly fell under the sway of local paramilitary groups who exerted a strong influence in their respective districts. These groups also assumed the role of policing their communities and rooting out what they described as anti-social elements. In the February 1974 edition of Ulster Loyalist, a UDA publication, the UDA warned that it intended to take firm action against teenaged criminals and vandals in the Sandy Row and Village areas.

Robert Fisk, Belfast correspondent for The Times between the years 1972-75, regarded the Sandy Row UDA as having been one of the most truculent of all paramilitary outfits in Belfast. Their bellicose stance over the street barricades they erected during the Ulster Workers Council Strike in May 1974 almost led them into direct confrontation with the British Army and they had even made preparations to fight if the latter had smashed the UDA roadblocks. The Sandy Row UDA's commander during this volatile period was Sammy Murphy who used as his headquarters the local Orange Hall. In addition to Sandy Row, Murphy had overall command of the South Belfast UDA and was referred to as a community leader in the British Army's press releases although his name and paramilitary affiliation were not mentioned. To defuse the explosive situation, Murphy engaged in talks with the Army which proved successful. According to journalists Henry McDonald and Jim Cusack, the Sandy Row and Donegall Pass UDA were almost completely out of control by this time; both the male and female members were caught up in violence and drunkenness and already inured to beatings and killings. Drinking clubs or shebeens where alcohol was obtained cheaply were common features in the area. Author David M. Kiely suggested that by this stage the women's unit was more about gangsterism and mob rule than adhering to a political cause.

The Sandy Row unit was not the only women's unit within the UDA. There was a particularly active women's group on the Shankill Road which had been established by Wendy "Bucket" Millar as the first UDA women's unit. A number of the members were highly visible due to the beehive hairstyles they typically wore. Although each unit was independent of the others, Jean Moore and later Hester Dunn served as the overall leaders of the UDA's women's department at the UDA headquarters in Gawn Street, east Belfast. Tanya Higgins and Nancy Brown Diggs observed in their book Women Living in Conflict that the loyalist paramilitary women were "angrier and more militant" than their male counterparts. Another analysis was provided by Sandra McEvoy in her report Women Loyalist Paramilitaries in Northern Ireland: Duty, Agency and Empowerment - a Report from the Field in which she suggested that by joining paramilitary groups like the UDA, loyalist women were provided with a sense of freedom and personal and political power that had previously been denied them in the domestic sphere; furthermore by taking up "the gun", the women proved they were willing to go to prison for their beliefs and the loyalist cause.

The commander of the Sandy Row women's unit was Elizabeth "Lily" Douglas, described by Kiely as having revered power above everything else in her life. As leader of that particular unit she exerted a great deal of control over the lives of other women within the area that included intimidation and moral policing. The middle of three daughters, Douglas was born and raised in an impoverished working-class family. She married at the age of 17 and had four children. By 1974, Douglas (aged 40) who lived in a terraced house in Sandy Row's City Street had a criminal record dating back over ten years for various offences which included smuggling, forgery, assault, inflicting bodily harm and running a brothel. When Ogilby had publicly denounced the women's UDA over the food parcels, she was not fully aware of Douglas' violent character and the considerable amount of authority she wielded in Sandy Row.

=== Kangaroo court ===
On 23 July 1974, eight weeks after Ogilby gave birth to a premature son, Derek, fathered by Young, five UDA women, including her lover's wife Elizabeth Young (32), Kathleen Whitla (49, the second-in-command), Josephine Brown (18), Elizabeth Douglas (19), led by the latter's mother, commander Lily Douglas, abducted Ogilby from a friend's house in the Suffolk housing estate. They took her back to Sandy Row and put her before a kangaroo court held inside the disused Warwick's Bakery in 114 Hunter Street between Felt Street and Oswald Street, which had been converted into a UDA club. Ogilby had often frequented the club with Young on previous occasions prior to his internment; according to Kiely she had enjoyed the company of the other patrons and being part of the camaraderie of loyalists "against the Fenians". A total of eight women and two men presided over this "trial"; Elizabeth Young, however, had by then absented herself as she was not part of Douglas' "Heavy Squad". The "Heavy Squad" were the members of the Sandy Row women's UDA unit who meted out punishment beatings by Douglas' orders. Ogilby was grilled for an hour over her affair with Young and regarding her calumnies over the food parcels. At some stage, Douglas told her, "We have rules here. We all stick to them and I expect anybody new to do the same". Ogilby, by now frightened at the predicament in which she found herself, was additionally informed that if found guilty, she would be subjected to a "rompering". The notorious UDA "romper rooms" had been invented in the early 1970s by UDA North Belfast Brigadier Davy Payne. Named after the children's television programme, these "romper rooms" were located inside vacant buildings, warehouses, lock-up garages, and rooms above pubs and drinking clubs. Once inside, a victim would be "rompered" (beaten and tortured) before being killed. Although most of the victims were Catholics, many Protestants were also consigned to the "romper rooms".

Despite the UDA women having found Ogilby guilty, the two UDA men present at the "trial" couldn't reach a verdict and gave orders that she be released. The women drove her to the Glengall Street bus station where she got on a bus headed for the YWCA hostel she had moved to on the Malone Road. The women then "rearrested" her. It was alleged that this decision came about after she sarcastically remarked in reference to Douglas, "Who does she think she is? The Queen?" which had freshly infuriated Douglas and the others. Blocking the bus as it pulled out of the station into the street, Douglas and her "Heavy Squad" then boarded the bus and dragged her off into the waiting car for a further grilling. Minutes later, after being alerted by the bus station staff, the car was stopped by the Royal Ulster Constabulary (RUC). Although Douglas claimed they were on their way to a party, the querying policeman told the women about the report of one of them having been forced off the bus. In an attempt to mollify Douglas, Ogilby then spoke up admitting that she was the person who had been removed from the bus but that "It was nothing. Just a couple of us fooling around". The police however remained unconvinced of their claims and the eight women and Ogilby were taken into the RUC Queen Street station for questioning. All of the women were asked for their names and addresses; the majority lived in the Sandy Row area. (Note: Lily Douglas came from City Street, Henrietta Piper Cowan came from Teutonic Street, Josephine Agnes Brown from Blythe Street; located in Sandy Row. The others had Sandy Row addresses as well with the exception of Christine Kathleen Smith who lived in Tates Avenue, which is in the neighbouring Village area and Kathleen Whitla of Howard Street South in Donegall Pass. [ref: Ciaran Barnes. Andersonstown News]) Fearing the grisly fate that typically befell informers, Ogilby did not say anything to the RUC about the UDA kangaroo court or threats against her. Therefore, she and the eight other women were released without being charged the following morning at 2.00 a.m. Ogilby returned to the police station a few hours later, visibly frightened, but was sent home in a taxi after refusing to give the reason for her distress. That same day inside a Sandy Row pub, Douglas told the other women that Ogilby was a troublemaker who had to die, and she speedily made arrangements to facilitate the murder.

== "Romper room" beating ==
That same Wednesday 24 July 1974 at 3:30 pm, outside the Social Services office in Shaftesbury Square, Ogilby and her daughter were kidnapped by 25-year-old UDA man Albert "Bumper" Graham, while members of Lily Douglas' "Heavy Squad" waited at the nearby Regency Hotel lounge bar overlooking the office. They knew beforehand that Ogilby had an appointment that afternoon at the Shaftesbury Square office. Using the pretext that a UDA commander wished to speak with her, Graham was able to abduct Ogilby and her daughter Sharlene as they left the office; Ogilby, taken in by Graham's words, willingly got into his blue minibus. Having made a pre-arranged signal to the watching women, Graham drove the two females away to the UDA club in Hunter Street, Sandy Row, which had been turned into a "romper room". When the UDA women, led by Douglas, arrived on the scene, Ogilby tried to escape, but was grabbed and forcibly detained. After Graham sent Sharlene to a corner shop to buy sweets, Douglas ordered Ogilby to be dragged inside the former bakery and forced upstairs to the first floor where she was made to sit on a wooden bench, blindfolded with a hood placed over her head. By this stage, Ogilby was so intimidated and terrorised by the "Heavy Squad", she no longer put up any resistance. Sunday Life newspaper suggested that she was bound to a chair instead of a bench. Ciarán Barnes, a journalist writing for the paper, had conducted an interview with Sharlene Ogilby in 2010. Retired RUC detective, Alan Simpson, who devoted a chapter to the Ann Ogilby murder in his 1999 book Murder Madness: True Crimes of The Troubles, instead affirmed that Ogilby was forced by her captors to sit on a wooden bench. Although she was hooded and blindfolded, her hands remained untied.

Acting under earlier instructions by Douglas, who had remained downstairs, to give Ogilby a "good rompering", two members of the "Heavy Squad", teenagers Henrietta Piper Cowan (17) and Christine Smith (16), both of whom were wearing masks, proceeded to attack Ogilby. Cowan punched her forcefully in the face, knocking her to the floor. Ogilby was then kicked in the face, head, and stomach by both girls before blows from sticks were rained down upon her. When the two teenagers began battering Ogilby's face and head with bricks which had been lying about the dismantled bakery, Albert Graham and "Heavy Squad" member Josephine Brown (who was also masked), saw Ogilby's blood staining the hood and realising things had gone too far, started to panic and remonstrated with the girls to discontinue the beating. Cowan and Smith did stop, to smoke cigarettes and make plans to attend a disco that evening. Simpson suggested that during the attack, Ogilby had placed her hands inside the hood in a futile attempt to protect her face from the force of the bricks.

Meanwhile, Ogilby's daughter, Sharlene, had returned from the shops; she entered the club, climbed the stairs to the first floor and began banging on the door and crying for her mother. Although by this stage Ogilby had sustained severe head injuries from the brutal assault, Sharlene heard her screaming and pleading with her assailants for mercy while they danced to blaring disco music. Ignoring the injured woman's pleas for her life and Sharlene's cries, Henrietta Cowan, once again wielding a brick, resumed beating Ogilby on the head with renewed vigour until she lay dead on the floor. The beating session had lasted for over an hour. Ogilby received (according to the later autopsy report) a total of 24 blows to the head and body with a blunt object, 14 of which had caused "a severe fracture to the bulk of the skull".

Albert Graham took Sharlene out of the building and drove her back to the YWCA hostel; as he left her on the doorstep he reassured the little girl that her mother was inside waiting for her. Sharlene was looked after by the hostel staff until she was placed in the care of the Social Services. Back at the UDA club, Cowan removed the bloodstained hood and saw by her appalling head wounds and badly-bruised, disfigured face that Ann Ogilby was obviously dead; the body was then wrapped up in a brown sack and carried downstairs. The killers went to have a drink with Lily Douglas to whom they recounted the details of the fatal beating as she had remained on the ground floor the entire time. Afterwards, Cowan and Smith got dressed up and went out to the disco as planned.

=== Immediate aftermath ===
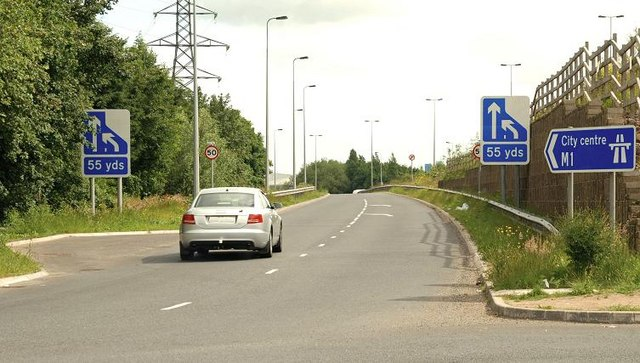
The M1 motorway at Stockman's Lane close to where Ann Ogilby's body was found

Douglas arranged for the body's disposal and unnamed UDA men later loaded it onto a van and dumped it in a ditch in Stockman's Lane near the M1 motorway. (Note: Although Lily Douglas admitted to the CID that she made the necessary arrangements for the disposal of Ann Ogilby's body, she refused to give the names of the men who carried out the removal. Ciaran Barnes alleged that Sandy Row UDA commander Sammy Murphy (now deceased) was involved. [ref: Sunday Life. Ciaran Barnes]) It was discovered five days later on 29 July by motorway maintenance men. The RUC were immediately called to the scene which was then photographed and mapped. Ogilby, clad in a red jumper, grey trousers and wearing just one shoe, was lying on her back partly submerged in 18 inches of stagnant water with her blackened and battered face visible and her arms outstretched. Her missing shoe and a large brown sack were discovered not far away from her body at the top of the ditch. There were no identifying documents found on her. The press, along with local television and radio news bulletins, released details regarding her physical appearance and the distinctive rings on her fingers. Hours later, a social worker from the Shaftesbury Square Social Services office, who had been scheduled to meet with Ann Ogilby on 24 July, contacted the RUC telling them that Ogilby and her daughter Sharlene had arrived at the office late for the appointment but left without explanation before the social worker could speak with Ann. She informed the RUC that Ogilby had not been seen since that afternoon. The social worker was then taken to the mortuary where she confirmed that the dead woman inside was Ann Ogilby. One of Ogilby's brothers later positively identified her. The police were told Sharlene was in the care of Social Services.

Due to the location of the body, the murder investigation was allocated to the RUC B Division (West Belfast), based at the Springfield Road station where CID Detective Alan Simpson served. He formed part of the CID team set up to investigate the Ogilby killing. After Sharlene was located in a children's home, she was interviewed by a female detective; she clearly remembered the events of 24 July. It was arranged for Sharlene to accompany three CID detectives in a car to Sandy Row and she was able to direct them to the disused bakery in Hunter Street. A Scenes of Crime Officer was sent to the scene to examine the building's interior and collect the evidence. Forensics later showed that the bloodstains police detectives found on the floor and on the items retrieved from inside the UDA club matched Ogilby's blood group. Documents were also found on the premises bearing William Young's name. By that time the suspects had already been rounded up and taken in for interrogation. These were the eight women who had been inside the car with Ogilby on the evening of 23 July following the fracas outside the Glengall Street bus station.

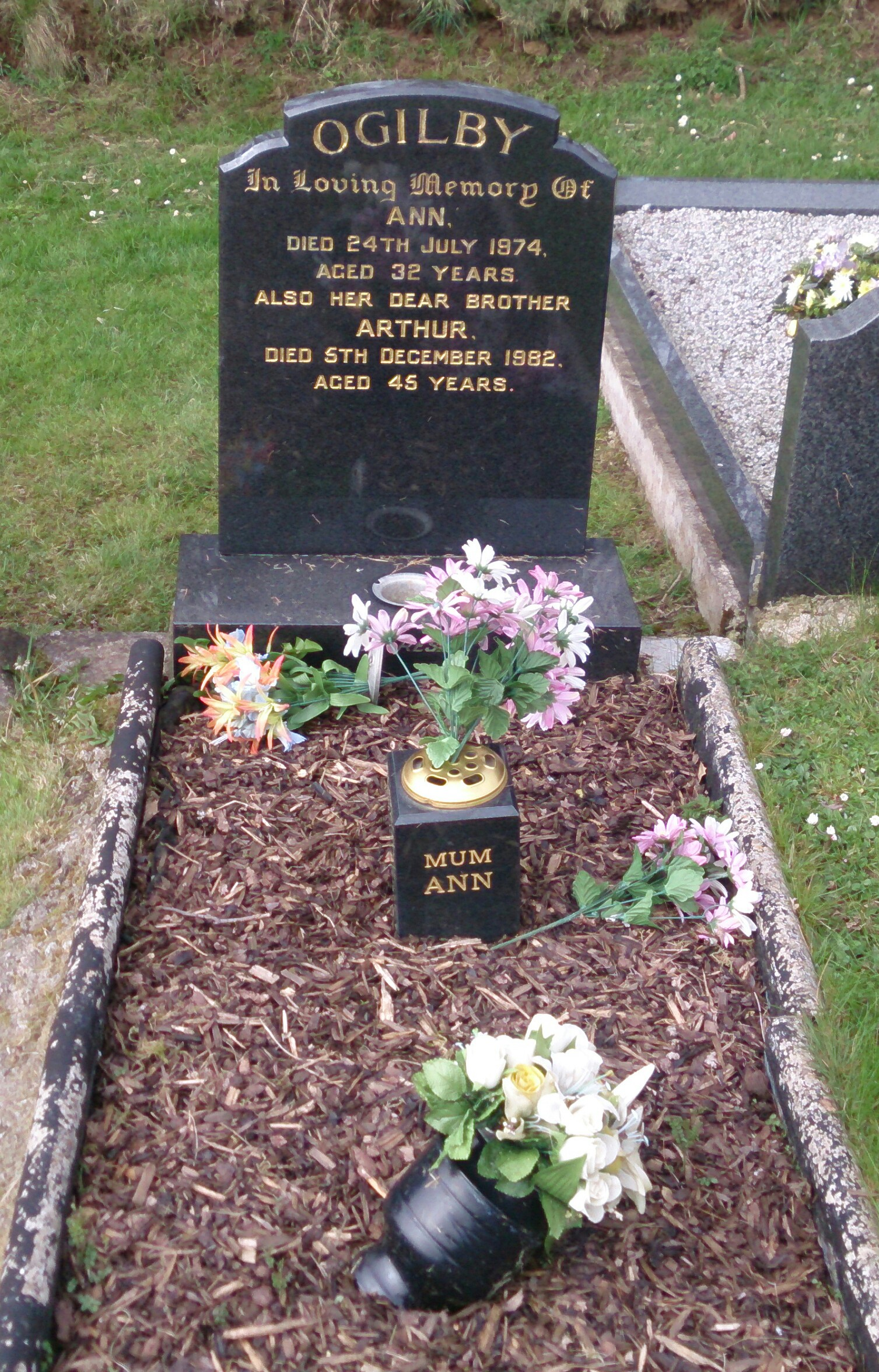
Ann Ogilby's grave at Umgall Cemetery

Ogilby, aged 31 or 32 at the time of her death, was buried in Umgall Cemetery, Templepatrick, County Antrim. Her children Sharlene and Derek were put into care. The Ogilby family received only £149 compensation from the State to cover her funeral expenses. It was later revealed that Ogilby had planned to relocate to Edinburgh, Scotland as soon as her infant son, Derek, was released from hospital (on account of his premature birth).

=== Reactions ===
Ogilby's murder caused widespread revulsion and shock throughout Northern Ireland, even though it had taken place during the most turbulent period of the Troubles when bombings and sectarian killings had become commonplace. Protestants were especially appalled that Ogilby, herself a Protestant, had become a victim of loyalist violence and angrily denounced the UDA. Journalist Ciarán Barnes described it as being one of the most brutal murders of the Troubles; adding that its sheer savagery and the fact that it was carried out by women against another woman within earshot of her child left a lasting impression upon the public psyche. The UDA leadership had not sanctioned the killing; and there was general condemnation from the UDA prisoners inside the Maze Prison. According to Ian S. Wood, the UDA's commander Andy Tyrie had not sufficient control over the many units that comprised the UDA to have been able to prevent the punishment beating from being carried out. A spokesman for the UDA released a statement condemning the killing and the women's unit that carried it out which was first published in the Irish Times on 8 February 1975:

We have completely disowned them [Sandy Row women's UDA]. We think the whole affair was foul and sickening. Ogilby was cleared by the UDA of an allegation about her private life long before she was killed. The killing was an act of jealousy by a group of women.

Following the Ogilby attack, the Sandy Row women's UDA unit was permanently disbanded by the UDA leadership. None of the other UDA women's units had consented to or been aware of the fatal punishment beating until it was reported in the news. Additionally, the Sandy Row women's unit notwithstanding, UDA "romper rooms" were more commonly used by male members of the organisation than by their female counterparts. Journalists Henry McDonald and Jim Cusack described Ogilby's death as typical of the "brutish ... culture" that dominated the UDA and other paramilitary groups in Northern Ireland. In reference to this attack and other cases of "rompering", the authors argue that "rape and the beating and humiliation of women in working-class Belfast was as routine as gunfire but was subsumed in the maelstrom of violence engulfing the North".

=== Convictions ===
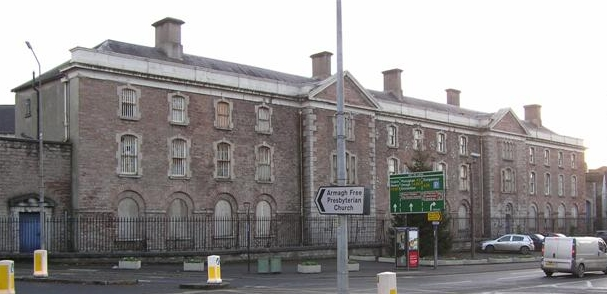
Former Armagh Women's Prison. Ann Ogilby's killers were imprisoned here after being convicted of her murder. Albert Graham was sent to the Maze Prison.

Within weeks of the killing, the RUC had arrested ten women and one man in connection with the murder; this group contained Douglas' entire "Heavy Squad". Most of the women were unemployed and at least three had male relatives imprisoned for paramilitary offences. On 6 February 1975 at the Belfast City Commission, teenagers Henrietta Cowan and Christine Smith pleaded guilty to murder. They were now aged 18 and 17 respectively. Characterised as having been "without feeling or remorse", they were convicted of carrying out the murder and sentenced to be detained at Armagh Women's Prison for life at the pleasure of the Secretary of State for Northern Ireland. Smith was not the only member of her family to be involved in loyalist paramilitary activity. Her elder brother, prominent South Belfast UDA member Francis "Hatchet" Smith (28), was shot dead in Rodney Parade, off Donegall Road, by the IRA in January 1973 after he, as part of a UDA unit, gunned down Peter Watterson, a 15-year-old Catholic boy, in a drive-by sectarian shooting at the Falls Road/Donegall Road junction. A roofer by trade who was married with one child he was (despite his wife having been Catholic), the local UDA commander in the Village area where he lived.

Described to the court as the leader of the Sandy Row women's UDA unit, Lily Douglas, who had ordered the fatal punishment beating, pleaded guilty to manslaughter. The charge of murder was withdrawn on the grounds that she had not actually intended for her "Heavy Squad" to kill Ogilby and she was subsequently sentenced to ten years' imprisonment in Armagh Prison. She received two further sentences (which were to run concurrently with her 10 years) of three years each, for intimidation and detaining Ogilby against her will. The exact motive for the murder was not established in court. During police interrogation, Douglas maintained that Ogilby's killing was the result of a personal vendetta, stating "It was not a UDA operation, they had nothing to do with it. It was just a move between a lot of women, a personal thing". In his book The Protestants of Ulster which was published in 1976, Geoffrey Bell stated that the women murdered her as punishment for her affair with William Young. Henry McDonald and Jim Cusack suggested that jealousy and bloodlust were the motives for the murder. The others received lesser sentences: Albert Graham and Josephine Brown, after pleading guilty, were sentenced to three years imprisonment on charges of being accessories after the fact and causing grievous bodily harm to Ann Ogilby; the Crown withdrew the murder charge against the pair after recognising their attempt to prevent Cowan and Smith from continuing with the fatal beating. The unit's second-in-command, Kathleen Whitla was given two years for intimidation; Maud Tait (21), Anne Gracey (28), Elizabeth Douglas, Jr (19), and Marie Lendrum (23), were all sentenced to 18 months imprisonment for intimidation, and an unnamed 16-year-old was given an 18-months suspended sentence for intimidation. The convictions resulted in the largest single ingress of loyalist women into a Northern Ireland prison.

Denouncing the UDA, the trial judge, Mr. Justice McGonigle stated, "I do not know what constitutes a 'paramilitary' organisation. What appears before me today under the name of the UDA is gun law, a vicious, brutalising organisation of persons who take the law into their own hands and who, by kangaroo courts and the infliction of physical brutality, terrorise a neighbourhood through intimidation, and rule an area of this city". During the trial, it emerged that plans to kill Ogilby had been formulated by the UDA unit several months before her kangaroo court "trial". Lily Douglas was lambasted by Justice McGonigle, "You ordered and directed the punishment of this girl. You chose and chose well those who were to carry out your directions. When you heard what had happened you organised the cover-up and disposal of the body. Your concern was that these happenings should not come to light. You were the commander of these women; your responsibility was great. You are no stranger to crime. You have a record of smuggling, forgery, assault and actual bodily harm and aiding and abetting the keeping of a brothel. Though the last of these was in 1961 it is an indication of your character." The Northern Irish press dubbed Elizabeth "Lily" Douglas "the Sandy Row executioner".

== Aftermath ==
Sharlene Ogilby later married and has three children of her own. After her mother's murder, she was taken to live in Sion Mills by an aunt. For a while she kept in touch with her brother Gary but has since lost contact; she has no knowledge of what happened to her other brothers Stephen and Derek. Lily Douglas died shortly after being released from Armagh Prison on compassionate grounds in 1979; Kathleen Whitla is also deceased. Henrietta Cowan and Christine Smith were both released from Armagh in December 1983 after serving nine years. They returned to the Sandy Row area. Loyalist sources claimed Smith "deeply regretted" the part she played in Ogilby's murder. Graham, following his release from prison, also returned to south Belfast. To the present day he has steadfastly refused to discuss the murder. The rest of the women involved in Ogilby's murder are to date living in Sandy Row or the Village. William Young died in 2007.

The disused bakery in Hunter Street has since been demolished.

Belfast poet Linda Anderson wrote a poem, Gang-Bang Ulster Style, based on the Ogilby killing. It was published in the August 1989, no. 204 edition of Spare Rib. Ann Ogilby's murder also featured in a Gavin Ewart poem entitled The Gentle Sex (1974). The murder was investigated by the Historical Enquiries Team (HET), which was established by the PSNI to inquire into the most controversial killings perpetrated during the Troubles.

== Bibliography ==
- Kiely, David M. (2005). Deadlier Than the Male: Ireland's Female Killers. Dublin: Gill & McMillan. ISBN 0717138941.
- McDonald, Henry; Cusack, Jim (2003). UDA: Inside the Heart of Loyalist Terror. Ireland: Penguin Ireland. ISBN 1844880206.
- Sales, Rosemary (1997). Women divided: gender, religion and politics in Northern Ireland. New York: Routledge. ISBN 1134775083.
- Simpson, Alan (1999). Murder Madness: True Crimes of The Troubles. Dublin: Gill & McMillan. ISBN 978-0-7171-2903-4.
- Wood, Ian S. (2006). Crimes of loyalty: a history of the UDA. Edinburgh: Edinburgh University Press. ISBN 0-7486-2426-0.
