= Michael Cusack =

Michael Cusack may refer to:

- Michael Cusack (Gaelic Athletic Association), Irish teacher and founder of the Gaelic Athletic Association.
- Michael Cusack (animator), Australian animator, writer, director and producer
- Michael Cusack (rugby union) (born 1984), rugby union footballer.
- Michael Cusack (cyclist) (born 1955), Irish author and former racing cyclist
- Sir Michael Cusac-Smith, 3rd Baronet (1793–1859) of the Cusack-Smith baronets
