= Hester Dunn =

Northern Irish political writer (born 1940)

Hester Rogers (born 1940) is a Northern Irish former loyalist activist and writer who was a member of the Ulster Defence Association's (UDA) political wing during the period of religious-political conflict known as the Troubles. She headed the UDA's women's department and ran the public relations and administration section at the organisation's headquarters in Gawn Street, off the Newtownards Road. An outspoken critic of strip searching female prisoners, she was a founder and activist for "Justice For Lifers", an organisation which advocated prison reform in Northern Ireland.

For over 10 years, Rogers contributed to the UDA's magazine Ulster and helped construct the Common Sense: Northern Ireland - An Agreed Process document which was a treatise on power-sharing between loyalists and nationalists, largely composed by South Belfast brigadier John McMichael and UDA commander Andy Tyrie. She left the UDA following the death of McMichael in December 1987 and the resignation of Tyrie four months later. McMichael was killed when a booby-trap bomb planted by the Provisional IRA exploded under his car. Tyrie resigned as commander after finding a similar device beneath his car.

== Early life ==
Rogers was born into a Protestant family in Northern Ireland and brought up in staunchly loyalist east Belfast. She describes herself as "an Ulster woman". Rogers worked for a time as a belly dancer. After becoming a mother, she moved into the loyalist Suffolk housing estate located in an interface area in west Belfast. Although she had no previous interest in politics, Rogers joined the Ulster Defence Association (UDA) - the largest loyalist paramilitary organisation - because of the prominent role it played within the loyalist community. Roger's early involvement with the UDA caused a number of difficulties for her as she became a target for local republican youths and her daughter was sent to Coventry at a local community centre when she attended Irish dance classes, a pastime usually associated with Catholics. Rogers also faced charges for public order offences and, although these were eventually dismissed, she was remanded on bail for eleven months as a result.

== UDA membership ==
Following this Rogers was invited by UDA commander Andy Tyrie to work for the organisation and she became part of its political wing. She ran the public relations and administration section at the UDA headquarters on Gawn Street, off the Newtownards Road along with Sammy Duddy. A heavy smoker who often dressed in black leather clothing, Rogers cut a distinctive figure at the UDA offices and often spoke to journalists on behalf of the organisation from there. She was noted for her wisecracking personality and for the banter and good-natured teasing she indulged in with Duddy and Tyrie. Sally Belfrage was one of the journalists who had met Rogers. She confirmed the influence Rogers enjoyed at UDA headquarters with the following observation: "Hester was obviously more than a mere receptionist - she appeared almost to choreograph the place, to know everybody's business". Rogers also headed the UDA's women's department. Founded by Wendy "Bucket" Millar, the UDA had several women's units, the most notable being the Shankill Road and Sandy Row groups. The latter achieved notoriety in 1974 when the unit, commanded by Elizabeth "Lily" Douglas, killed Protestant single mother Ann Ogilby in a savage "Romper Room" punishment beating. The attack, which shocked the Protestant community, had not been sanctioned by the UDA leadership. The latter strongly condemned it along with the Sandy Row women's unit.

Highly critical of the prison system in Northern Ireland, Rogers was a founder and activist for "Justice For Lifers", an organisation which advocated prison reform.

For over 10 years, she was a contributor to the UDA's magazine Ulster and was encouraged by the UDA leadership to write about women's issues. An outspoken critic of the strip searching of female prisoners in Armagh Women's Prison, she wrote an article about it in Ulster's July/August 1985 edition entitled "Strip Searches". She denounced the practise, stating:

Strip searches in the 200 year old Armagh Women's Prison are essential to security, say the authorities, but at what cost to the women prisoners? The cost as I see it is intimidation, degradation and the humiliation of women.

Two months earlier she wrote an article "A woman's place in the Loyalist community" for the 27 May 1985 edition of Northern Ireland's Fortnight Magazine. She supplied much of the political thinking which went into the Common Sense: Northern Ireland - An Agreed Process document which was a treatise on proposed power-sharing between loyalists and nationalists. It was largely a composition by South Belfast brigadier John McMichael and Andy Tyrie.

== Departure and later life ==
She left the UDA following the death of McMichael on 22 December 1987 and resignation four months later of Tyrie. The Provisional IRA planted a booby-trap bomb underneath McMichael's car outside his home in Lisburn. He was fatally injured when the device exploded. Tyrie tendered his resignation as commander when he found a similar bomb beneath his vehicle; in his case, rivals within the UDA were believed to have been behind the attempt on his life rather than republican paramilitaries. Rogers was close to Tyrie and was loyal to his leadership and so left the movement after his leadership came to an end.

Since quitting the UDA, Rogers took a University of Ulster women's studies course in the Belfast Institute of Further and Higher Education.
