= Mary Ellen Cusack =

Plant and insect collector (1833–1900)

- Born: Mary Ellen Tanner; July 11, 1833; Swan River Colony
- Died: December 26, 1900 (aged 67); Westcliffe, Colorado
- Known for: botany insect collecting
- Spouse: Thomas Bernard Cusack

Mary Ellen Cusack (née Tanner, 1833–1900) was an Australian-British botanist, who later in her life lived in Wet Mountain Valley, Colorado, United States.

== Biography ==
=== Early and married life ===
Cusack was born Mary Ellen Tanner on 11 July 1833 at Swan River Colony, Australia. Her parents were William Tanner (1801–1845), a Swan Valley Pioneer, and his wife Hester (née Viveash). Mary Ellen had three siblings: Oriel Viveash Tanner (1832–1911) who later became a Lieutenant-General in the British Army, Henry Charles Baskerville Tanner (1835–1898) later a surveyor and notable photographer and a sister named Eliza Hester Hannah Tanner (c. 1839–1859).

The Tanners and their children travelled back to the U.K. from Australia in about 1843, and after the loss of their parents, Mary Ellen, Eliza and Charles Tanner lived at the home of their Uncle and Aunt, Oriel and Eliza Viveash.

In 1854 at Overton Mary Ellen Tanner married Thomas Bernard Cusack (1831–1864), who was from Ireland, youngest son of the surgeon James William Cusack (1788–1861). The Cusacks had five children together, then Thomas Bernard Cusack died in 1864 at the age of only 32. Mary Ellen Cusack did not remarry.

=== Cusack in the United States ===
Cusack's son Reginald qualified as a Medical Doctor and emigrated to the United States seeking a better climate for his asthma in 1882, where he settled in Westcliffe [also written as West Cliff], Colorado, along with another brother Francis. Mary Ellen Cusack was herself present in Colorado by 1887 to visit her sons and a specimen of Rumex venosus she collected in Wet Mountain Valley in 1888 is in the collection of the Field Museum.

Cusack assembled a 'large collection' of plants from Colorado which later became part of the Herbarium at Kew. Cusack is also known to have collected insects, with her home the Cusack Ranch being described by entomologist Theodore Cockerell (1866–1948) as "a wonderful locality for collecting". Cockerell had met Cusack towards the end of her life, and many years later he gave an account of their friendship:

In the Wet Mountain Valley, Colorado, I found Mrs. M. E. Cusack, an elderly English lady who had always longed to study botany, but had been prevented by the circumstances of an exceptionally difficult life. She now began to form a herbarium, and I assisted her to the best of my ability, using Coulter's Manual of Rocky Mountain Botany, a very serviceable compilation mainl based on the writings of Asa Gray. Really critical work, such as that done in later years by Aven Nelson of Wyoming and P. A. Rydberg of New York, was out of the question, but we did acquire a fair knowledge of the local flora. The Cusack herbarium was eventually incorporated in that at Kew.

Cockerell referred to Cusack regularly in his correspondence and she has been described as 'his intellectual and "spiritual" friend' while he lived in Westcliffe.

Mary Ellen Cusack died at Westcliffe on 26 December 1900. She was buried in Colorado, and also has a memorial in Australia. The Chapel of the Holy Rosary in Cascade, Colorado, was built by Cusack's children in memory of their parents.
