= James William Cusack =

Irish surgeon, President of the RCSI

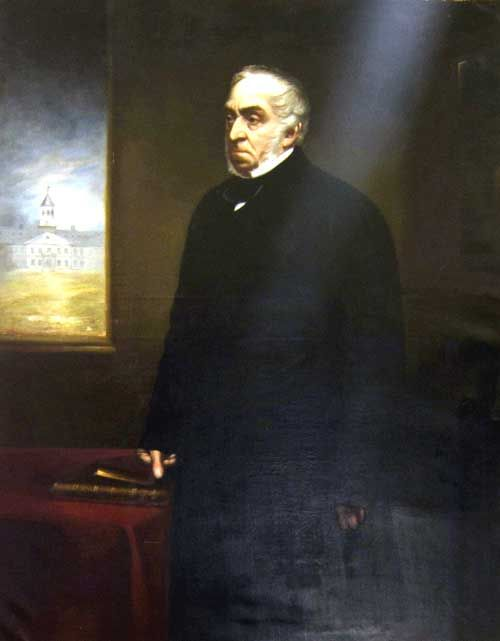
- Born: 26 May 1788
- Died: 25 September 1861 (aged 73)
- Medical career
- Profession: Surgeon

James William Cusack (26 May 1788 – 25 September 1861) was the president of the Royal College of Surgeons in Ireland (RCSI) in 1827, 1847, and 1858.

== Early life and education ==
James William Cusack was born at Laragh, Maynooth, County Kildare, on 26 May 1788. His parents were Athanasius (1749–1813), country gentleman, and Mary Ann Cusack (née Rotheram). He had 3 brothers, and one sister. He began an apprenticeship with Ralph Smith O’bré at Dr Steevens' Hospital, Dublin in 1806. Educated at Trinity College Dublin (TCD), Cusack graduated in arts in 1809 having won the Berkeley gold medal, medicine in 1812 and he was later awarded MD in 1850 and M.Ch. in 1859.

== Career ==
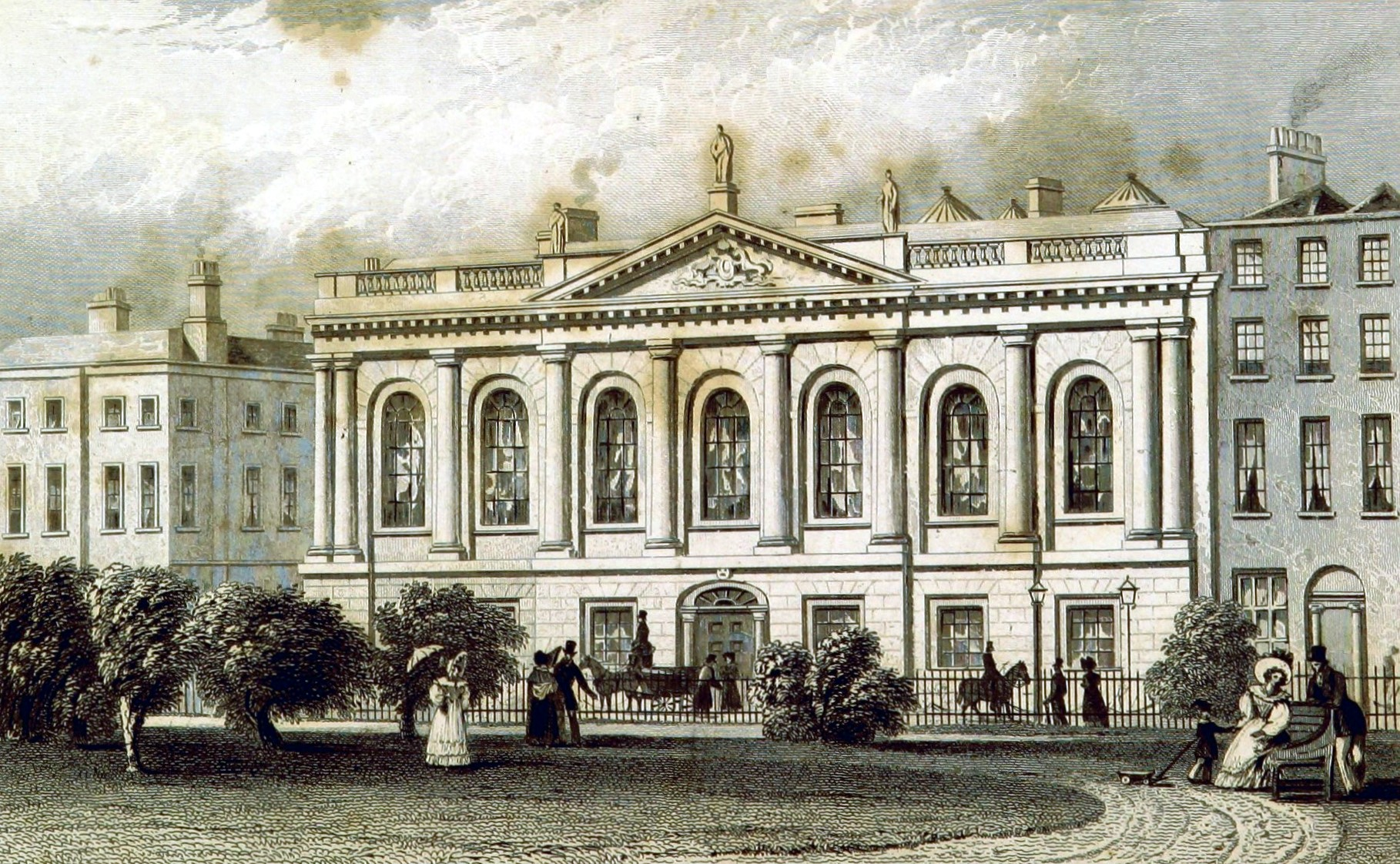
"The College of Surgeons, Dublin", (1837) Dublin delineated in twenty-six views, etc.

He was appointed resident surgeon in 1813 until 1834, assistant third surgeon 1834 to 1856, governor in 1838, and consulting surgeon in 1856 10 1861 at Dr Steevens' Hospital, Dublin. Having been the resident surgeon, he was then appointed chief administrator of the hospital, supervising the construction of the new theatre. He "became famous for his speedy first-aid treatment of a patient who was bleeding to death from a severed artery due to a gunshot wound."

Cusack was a founder, along with Robert Graves and Arthur Jacob, of the Medico-Chirurgical School, Park Street (later Lincoln Place) in 1824, serving as its professor of anatomy, physiology, and surgery from 1824 until it closed in 1849. The school was bought by William Wilde and became St Mark's Ophthalmic Hospital. When TCD began a 4 year diploma in surgery, Cusack was appointed the chair, making him the first catholic to hold a professorship under the whole control of TCD.

As a surgeon, Cusack had a significant reputation, a large practice and an unusually large number of apprentices. He was elected Member of RCSI in 1814, member of the Royal Irish Academy in 1829 and was a member of the Royal Dublin Society. He worked in close partnership with Abraham Colles at Steven's, and later apprenticed his half-brother, Samuel Colles. He also maintained a private practice on Kildare Street. During the Dublin cholera epidemic in 1832, he wrote articles with William Stokes for the Dublin Journal of Medical Science, highlighting the work conditions and low pay of dispensary doctors, many of whom also died from cholera.

== Family and death ==
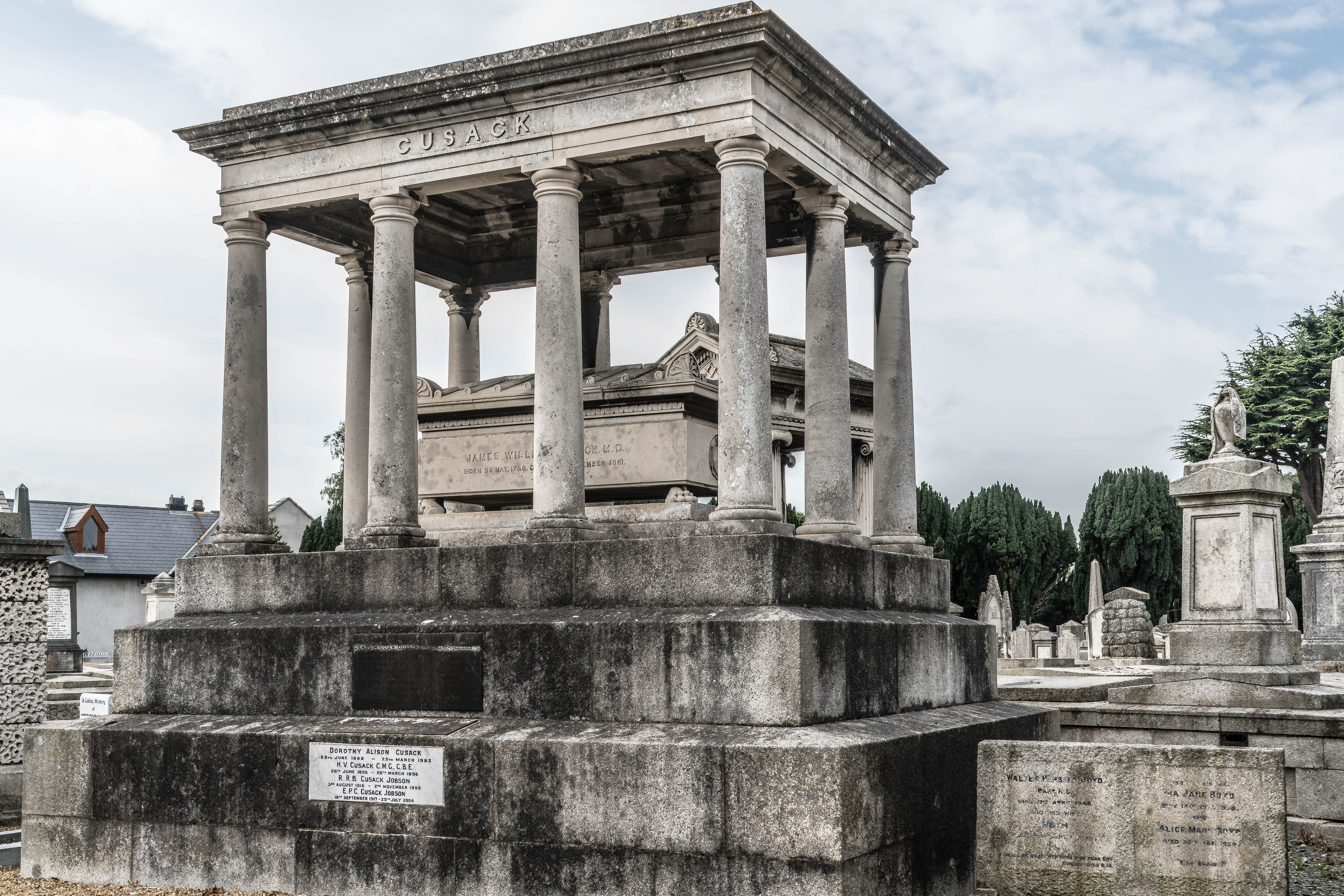
Cusack Vault in Mount Jerome Cemetery

Cusack married Elizabeth Frances Bernard (died 1837) in 1818. She was the eldest daughter and co-heiress of Joseph Bernard of Greenhills, County Offaly. They had 4 sons and 2 daughters:

- Henry Thomas Cusack (1820-1865) barrister
- Sir Ralph Smith Cusack (1821-1910), barrister
- James William Cusack (1824-1868) MD
- Elizabeth Cusack, married S. G. Wilmot, surgeon and president of RCSI

Cusack married again in 1838, to Frances Rothwell (née Radcliffe). He has residences at Abbeville House, Kinsealy, County Dublin, and Cussington, County Meath. He died at his home, 7 Merrion Square North on 25 September 1861, and was buried in St Thomas's churchyard, Dublin. There are two portraits of Cusack and busts by J. R. Kirk and John Lawler that are held in the RCSI.

== See also ==
- List of presidents of the Royal College of Surgeons in Ireland
