= Ralph Cusack (painter) =

Irish artist, horticulturist and writer (1912–1965)

- Born: Ralph Desmond Athanasius Cusack; 28 October 1912; Portmarnock, County Dublin, Ireland
- Died: 20 July 1965 (aged 52); Grasse, Alpes-Maritimes, France
- Education: Pembroke College, BA, 1934
- Occupations: Painter; stage designer; horticulturist; writer
- Movement: The White Stag Group
- Spouse(s): Kira Heiseler (divorced) Nancy Sinclair Cusack
- Children: 5
- Relatives: Sir Ralph Smith Cusack (great-grandfather); Mainie Jellett (cousin)

Ralph Desmond Athanasius Cusack (28 October 1912 – 20 July 1965) was an Irish painter, stage designer, horticulturist and writer active in Ireland and France.

== Early life and education ==
Cusack was born on 28 October 1912 at Drumnigh House in Portmarnock to James Robert Roland Cusack, a banker and later stockbroker, and Eileen Cusack (née Watson). Cusack was the great-grandson of Sir Ralph Smith Cusack and was the younger cousin of the painter Mainie Jellett.

Educated at Arnold House and Charterhouse School, Cusack grew up in a wealthy Anglo-Irish Unionist family. From 1931 to 1934, Cusack studied economics at Pembroke College, Cambridge.

== Career ==
In the mid 1930s Cusack moved to Menton, Alpes-Maritimes with his wife Kira Heiseler to help improve his Tuberculosis. Largely self-taught, Cusack began painting and developed a Cubist style. In May 1939, Cusack and Heiseler returned to Ireland.

In 1940, Cusack was elected a member of Society of Dublin Painters and joined The White Stag Group the following year. During 1942 to 1943, Cusack worked as a set designer with Anne Yeats. In May 1943, Cusack help found the Irish Exhibition of Living Art. In the late 1940s and early 1950s Cusack lived at Uplands House, Annamoe where he operated a horticultural business with his wife Nancy Sinclair Cusack.

By 1950, Cusack had ceased to paint. Cusack returned to France in 1954, and settled in Grasse in order to grow flowers for perfume. In 1958, Cusack published his only novel Cadenza, an Excursion in Ireland and London. The novel was subsequently published in the United States the following year.

== Personal life ==
In the 1930s, Cusack married Kira Heiseler before later divorcing in the mid 1940s. Cusack and Heiseler had two children.

Cusack later married Nancy Sinclair Cusack (née Sinclair), with whom he had 3 children.

On 20 July 1965 died in Grasse, aged 52.

== Legacy ==
Anthony Cronin, who boarded for a time with the Cusack family, based the character of Sir George Dermot on Cusack for his 1964 novel The Life of Riley.

== Bibliography ==
- Cusack, Ralph (1958). Cadenza, an Excursion. London, UK: Hamish Hamilton.
- Cusack, Ralph (2026). A Hyphenated Childhood. Dallas, Texas: Dalkey Archive Press.
