= Sandy Row =

Neighborhood in Belfast

- Interactive map of Sandy Row
- Former name: Carr's Row
- Maintained by: Belfast City Council
- Location: Shaftesbury, Belfast
- Postal code: BT12 5E
- Coordinates: 54.592°N 5.937°W
- North end: Durham Street
- South end: Lisburn Road

Sandy Row is an inner city area of south Belfast, Northern Ireland, which is predominantly Protestant working-class. In 2018, the population was estimated to be around 4,000. It is a staunchly loyalist area and heartland of the paramilitary Ulster Defence Association (UDA) and Orange Order.

== Location ==
Sandy Row is in south Belfast, beginning at the edge of the city centre, close to the Europa Hotel. The road runs south from the site of the former Boyne Bridge, now Boyne Bridge Place, then crosses Donegall Road and ends at the bottom of Lisburn Road. At the north end of the road was Murray's tobacco factory, opened in 1810, while at the other is a large Orange hall.

== History ==
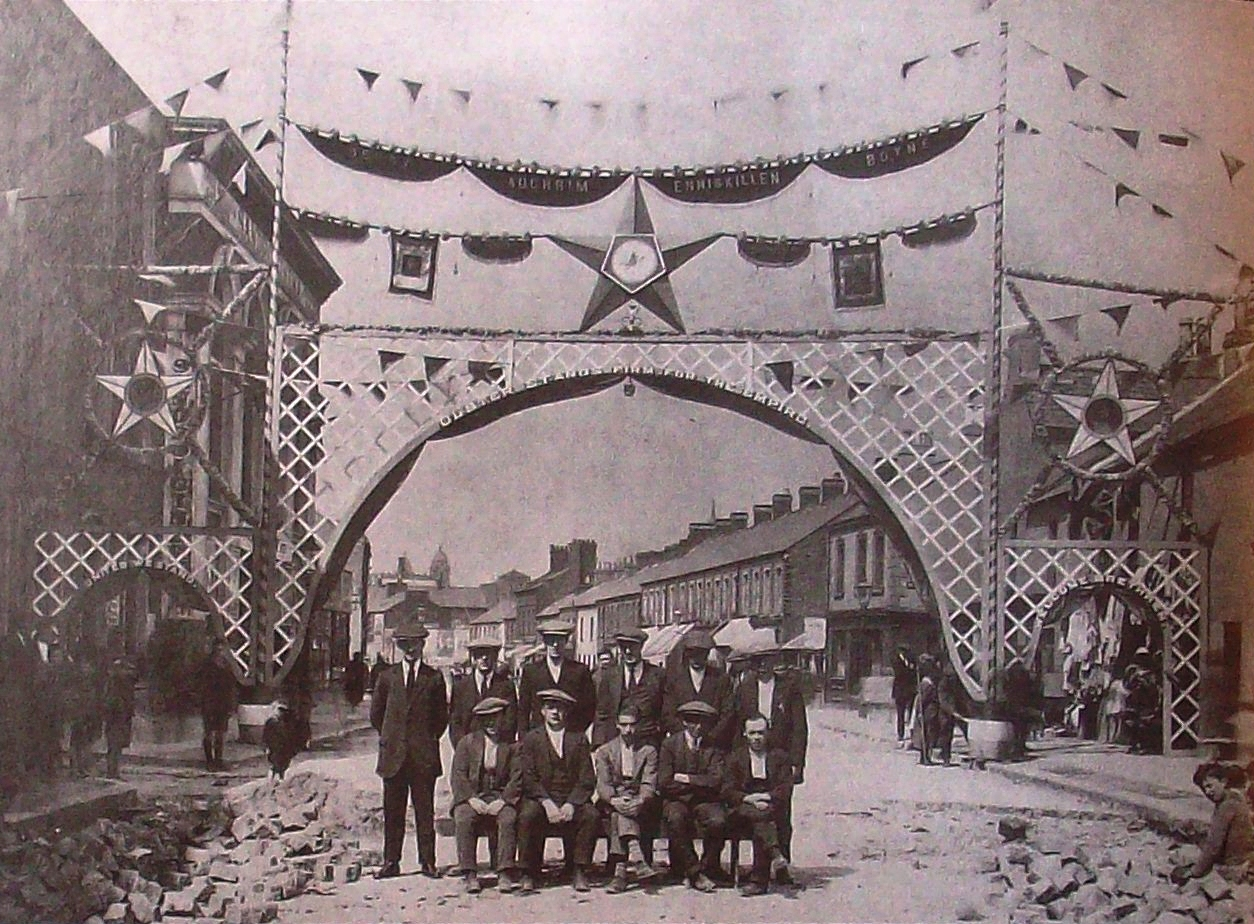
The first Orange Arch erected in Sandy Row, c. 1921. Its builder, Frank Reynolds is seen standing, fifth from the left

Formerly known as Carr's Row. For more than a thousand years, a road built along the Lagan River sandbanks was the principal thoroughfare leading southwards from Carrickfergus. "Carraig Fhearghais" – the rock of Fergus (5th century). During the late 1700s, 'Carr's Row' was originally a small village area on the outskirts of the town of Belfast.

In 1885, Sandy Row Royal Black District Chapter of the Royal Black Institution was formed. They are under the City of Belfast Grand Black Chapter, and participate in the Black Saturday demonstrations and Royal Thirteenth parade.

In April 1918, Sandy Row Women's Loyal Orange Lodge No. 17 was formed. The first Grand Mistress was Margaret Drennan, founder of Women's Loyal Orange Lodge No. 1. In April 2018, the Women's Lodge celebrated their centenary. In 2020, an exhibition was held at the Museum of Orange Heritage celebrating Sister Margaret Drennan.

To the north is the Boyne Bridge, which was built in 1935 to cross over the railway tracks leading to the nearby Great Victoria Street station. It was these tidal waters that deposited sandbanks alongside the road and provide the sandy road surface that led to the village being renamed in the early 1800s from the original name of Carr's Row, to Sandy Row, shown therefore as such on the 2nd edition OS Map (1846/62). With much development of the area, the redirection of the Blackstaff river and the construction of the Lagan Weir (1994), the sand lines of the row are long lost to history.

Its growth in population was in large part due to the expansion of the linen industry in Rowland Street.

In the 19th century Sandy Row became a bustling shopping district, and by the turn of the 20th-century, there were a total of 127 shops and merchants based in the road. It continued to draw shoppers from all over Belfast until the outbreak of the Troubles in the late 1960s. The rows of 19th-century terraced houses in the streets and backstreets branching off Sandy Row have been demolished and replaced with modern housing. Six of the houses which formerly lined Rowland Street have been rebuilt in the Ulster Folk Museum.

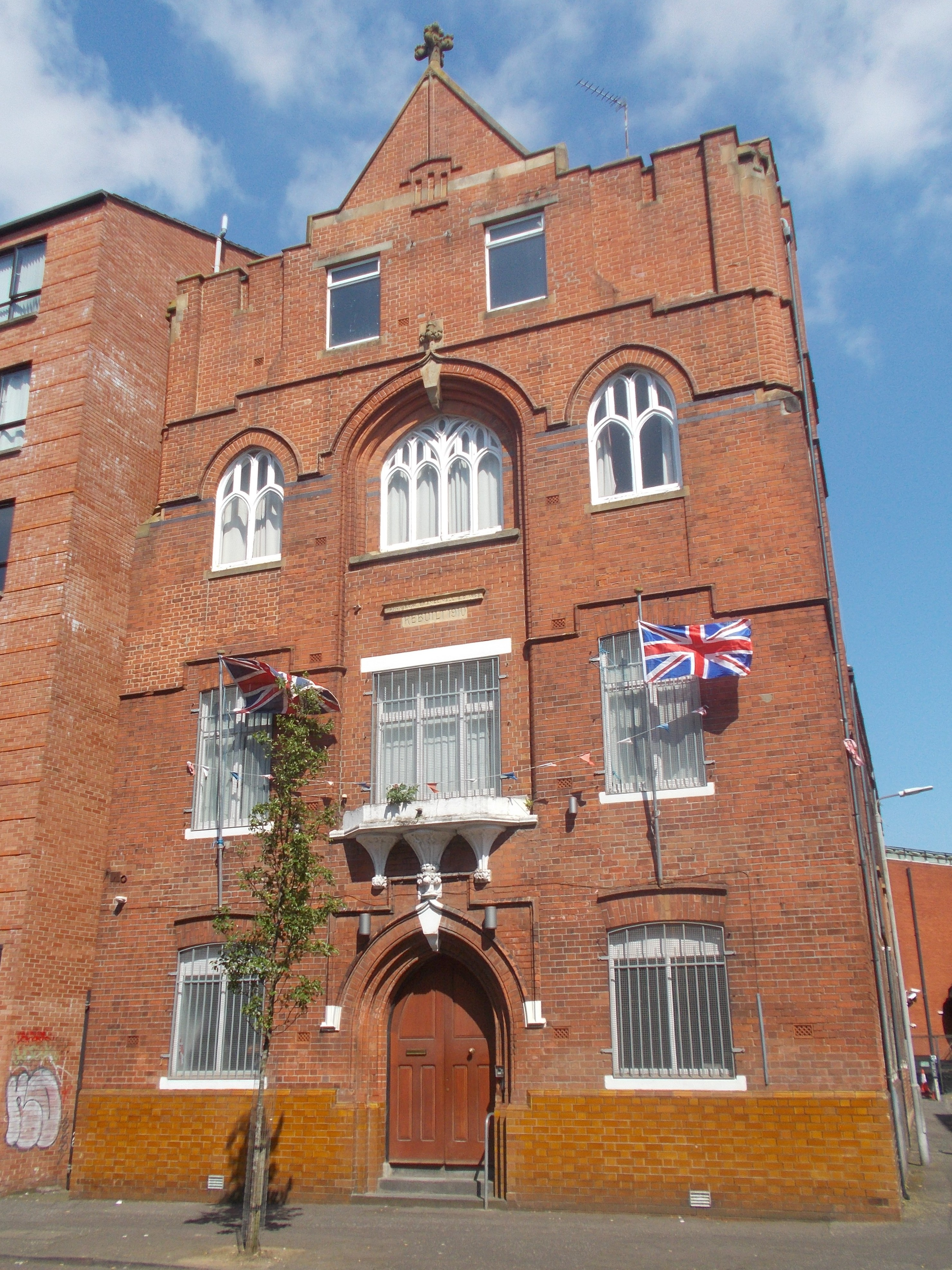
Sandy Row Orange Hall

It is a traditionally Protestant, close-knit loyalist community, noted for its elaborate Orange Order parades on the Twelfth, with over 40 Arches erected in its streets and a marching band of teenaged girls known as the "Sandy Row Girl's Band". In addition to the arches spanning the road, buildings and homes are decorated with flags, bunting and banners. The first Orange Arch was erected by Frank Reynolds in about 1921. In 1690, on his way south to fight at the Battle of the Boyne, King William III of England and his troops travelled along Sandy Row. Tradition holds that part of his army camped on the ground where the Orange Hall now stands. The Hall was opened in June 1910 by Lady Henderson, wife of former Lord Mayor of Belfast, James Henderson. By 1908, there were 34 Orange Lodges in the district. In the 19th and 20th-centuries, there was much sectarian fighting and rioting between Sandy Row Protestants and Catholics from Pound Loney, in the Lower Falls Road.

In the spring 1941 Belfast Blitz during the calamitous 15/16 April raid, the Luftwaffe dropped a parachute landmine at the top of Blythe Street, killing and fatally injuring over ten people including children. Terraced houses on both sides of the street were badly damaged, many with their facades blasted off. The Duke and Duchess of Gloucester paid a visit to the devastated street.

The Sandy Row redevelopment association which was founded in 1970, was one of the first loyalist community groups to open an advice centre. In 1996, the Sandy Row Community Forum was established. It acts as an umbrella organisation for all the community groups in the area.

=== The Troubles ===
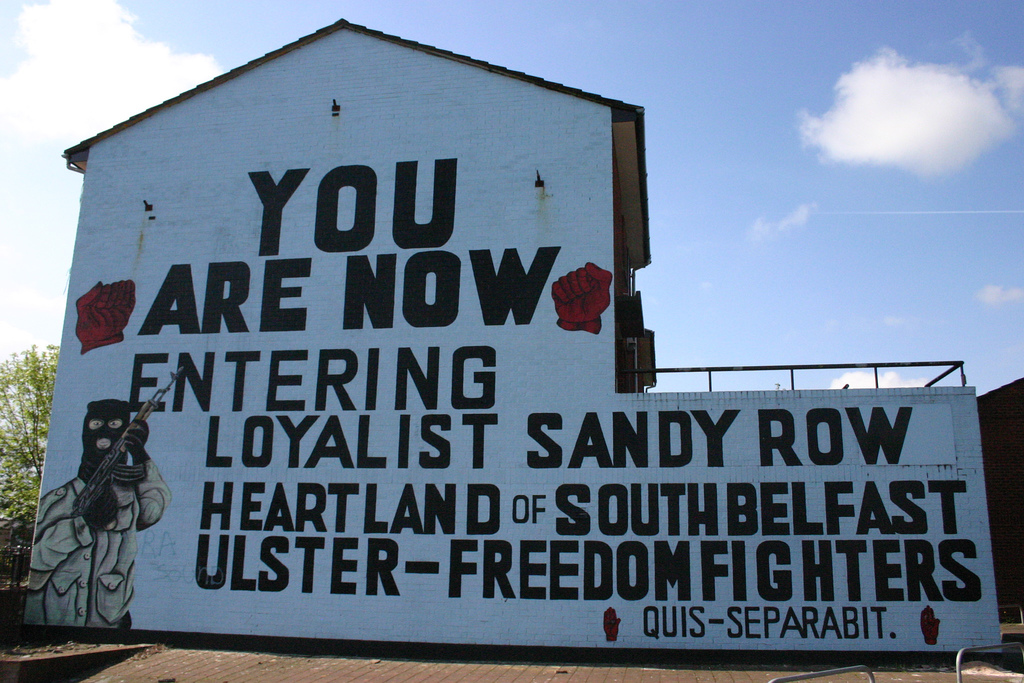
Paramilitary mural formerly displayed at the entrance to Sandy Row (removed 2012)

During The Troubles, the area had a strong Ulster Defence Association (UDA) presence. Sandy Row is part of the UDA South Belfast Brigade, commanded for many years by the late John McMichael and currently by Jackie McDonald. Its first known commander was Sammy Murphy who also led the Sandy Row UDA. He engaged in talks with the British Army during the Ulster Workers Council Strike in May 1974 to defuse a potentially violent confrontation between the Army and UDA over street barricades that had been erected in Sandy Row.

In December 1972, senior UDA member Ernie Elliott was shot dead outside a Sandy Row club by a fellow UDA man after a drunken brawl. On 7 February 1973, Brian Douglas, a Protestant fireman from Sailortown was shot to death by the UDA whilst fighting a fire caused by street disturbances in Bradbury Place. Sandy Row UDA members also launched a series of attacks on nearby Durham Street, a mainly Catholic area between Sandy Row and Falls Road, in the early 1970s with four Catholics killed in the area, including 16-year-old Bernard McErlain, in late March–April 1973. Two Protestant civilian men were killed on 30 March 1974 in a no-warning bomb attack carried out by an unknown republican paramilitary group against the Crescent Bar. On 24 July 1974, Ann Ogilby, a 32-year-old Protestant single mother of four, was savagely beaten to death with bricks and sticks inside the disused Warwick's bakery in Hunter Street by two teenagers from the Sandy Row women's UDA unit, commanded by Elizabeth "Lily" Douglas. The bakery had been converted to a UDA club. Ogilby's six-year-old daughter was outside the door and overheard her mother's screams inside whilst loud disco music played. Ogilby had been "sentenced to death" at a kangaroo court presided over by eight UDA women after it was discovered she was having an affair with a senior UDA man, who was married to one of the unit's members. She had also made defamatory remarks about her lover's wife. On 30 January 1976, the Provisional IRA exploded a car bomb outside the Klondyke Bar on the corner of McAdam Street. John Smiley, a middle-aged Protestant civilian was killed outright in the blast. Many people inside the pub suffered serious injuries including a barmaid who lost an eye, Vina Galaway. Less than two years before the attack, the Klondyke Bar was the subject of a photographic essay by Bill Kirk in a series of photographs taken in Sandy Row. The Klondyke had been built in 1872.

In the same year of the Klondyke bombing, an 18-year-old Catholic girl had her throat slit behind a Sandy Row pub by loyalist paramilitaries after she had been discovered drinking inside with Protestant friends.

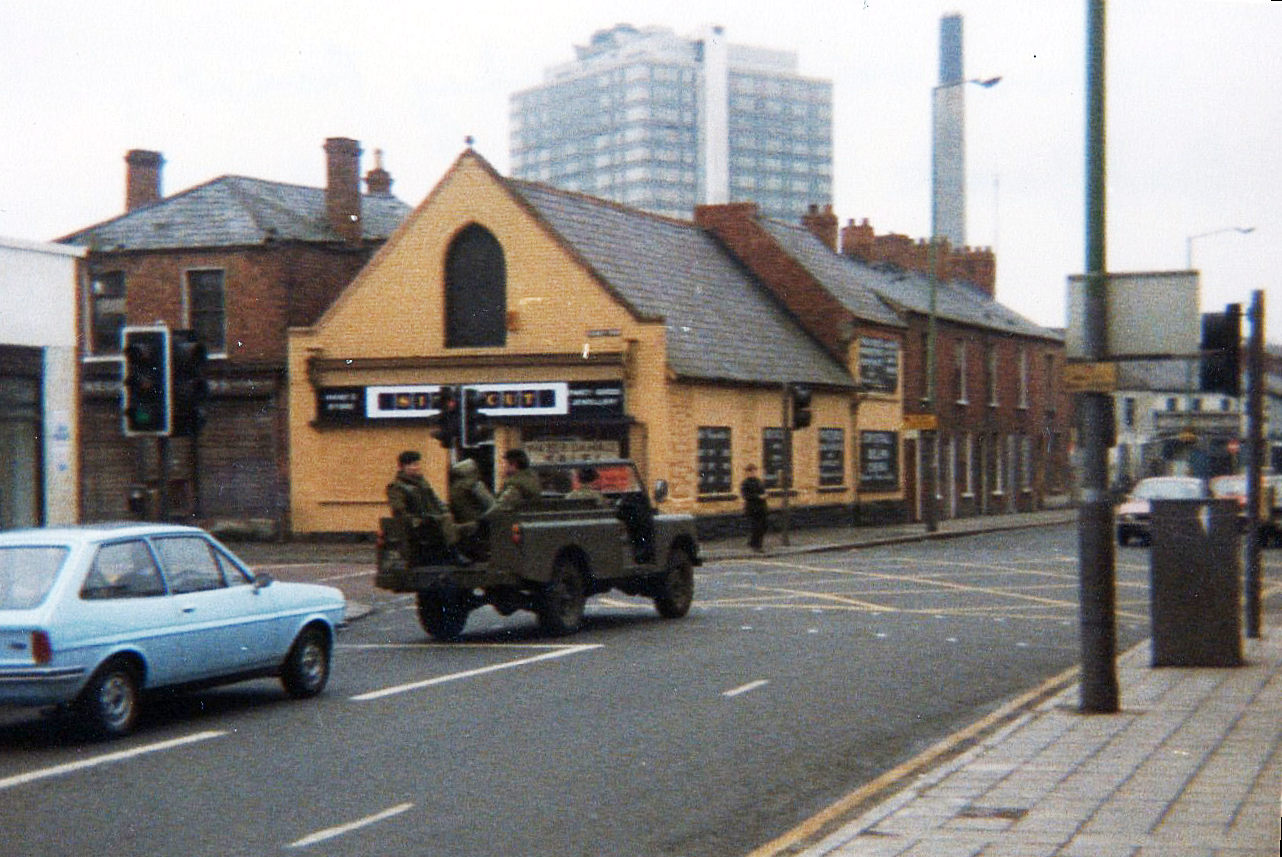
An army patrol crosses the junction with Donegall Road, 1981. All of the buildings, except the City Hospital tower and chimney in the background, are now demolished.

Thomas Vance, one of the 18 British soldiers killed in the Warrenpoint ambush, was a native of Sandy Row.

The large Ulster Freedom Fighters mural was one of many loyalist murals found in Sandy Row; it could be seen from the northern end of the street. It was announced in June 2012 that the mural would be painted over with another showing William of Orange. The announcement was made by Jackie McDonald following a year of talks with residents and business leaders, some of whom claimed that the presence of the mural was dissuading other businesses from settling in office blocks nearby. It was removed on 25 June and replaced with the mural depicting William of Orange.

In 2012, Sandy Row Mitchelburne Branch Club of the Apprentice Boys of Derry was established.

Sandy Row contains a loyalist souvenir shop, the "One Stop Ulster Shop".

== Demographics ==
The Sandy Row Neighbourhood Renewal Area (NRA) was designated by the Department for Social Development in 2004, with boundaries extending along the Westlink, Donegall Road and Great Victoria Street. On Census day (29 April 2001) there were a total of 2,153 people living in the Sandy Row NRA. Of these:

- 20% were aged under 16 years and 21% were aged 60 and over;
- 44% of the population were male and 56% were female;
- 10% were from a Catholic community background;
- 86% were from a "Protestant and Other Christian (including Christian related)" community background;
- 14% of people aged 16–74 were unemployed.

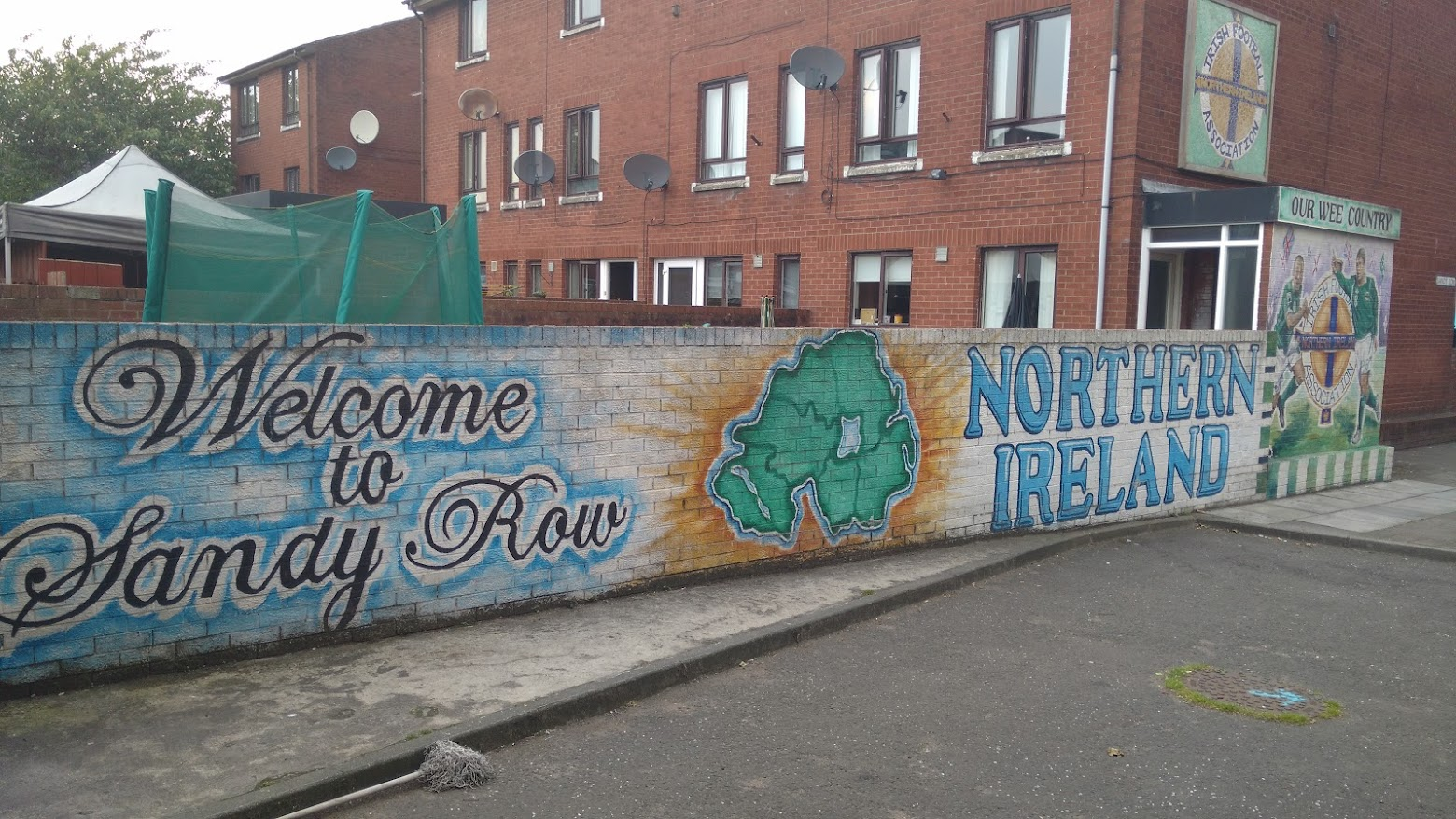
Entrance to Sandy Row

For more details see: NI Neighbourhood Information Service.

== Sport ==
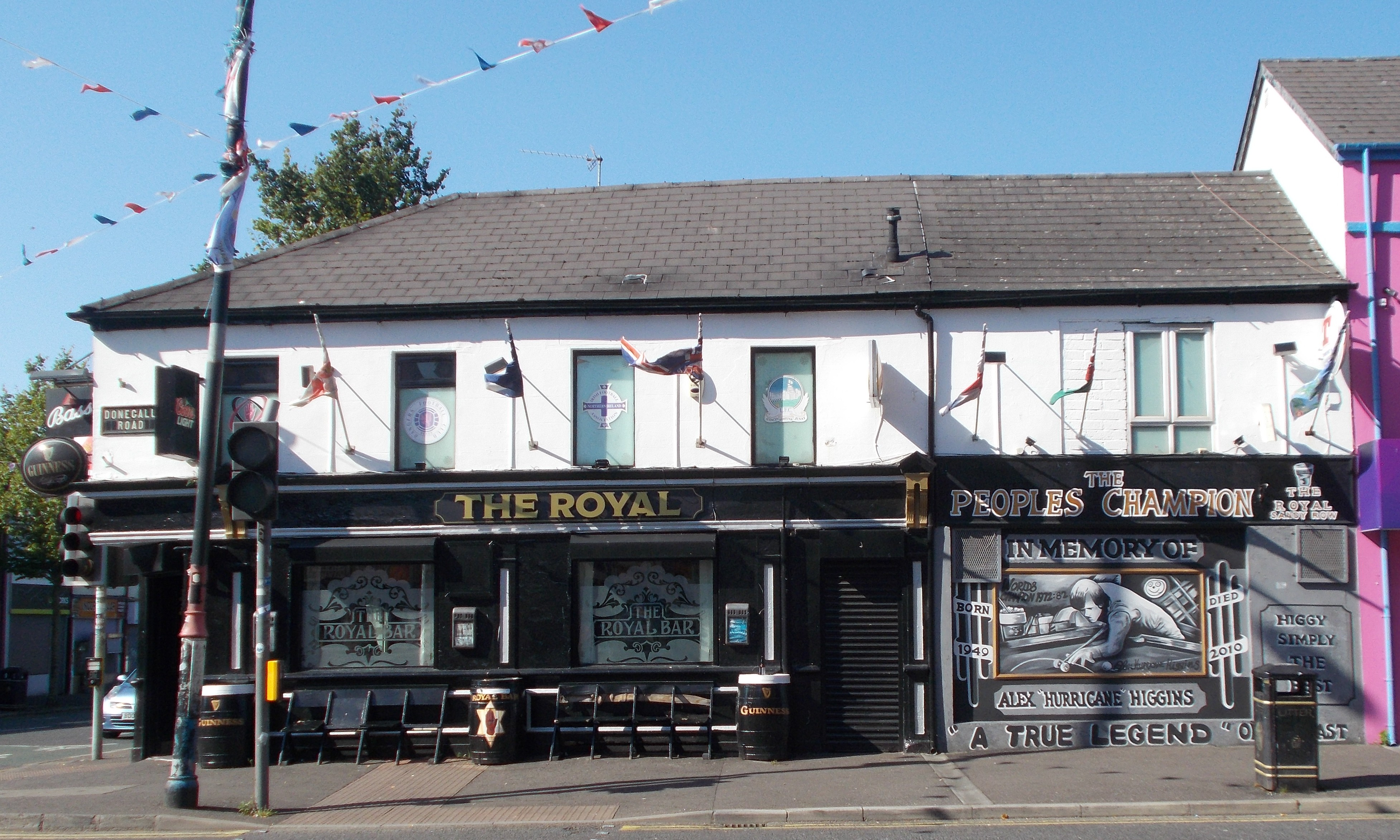
The Royal Bar, Sandy Row

The Linfield F.C. was founded in Sandy Row in March 1886 by workers from the Ulster Spinning Company's Linfield Mill. Originally named the Linfield Athletic Club, its playing ground, "the Meadow", was situated behind the mill. Linfield's first captain was Sam "Thaw" Torrans.

Sandy Row F.C. was founded in 2012 and is a part of the Northern Amateur Football League. They play their home games at Blanchflower Playing Fields.

Celebrated snooker champion Alex "Hurricane" Higgins was a native of Sandy Row, having been born in Abingdon Drive, off the Donegall Road. He first started playing at the age of 11 in the Jampot club.

== In popular culture ==
In the 1980s, Kate Bush ordered a custom lambeg drum from William Hewitt's Drum Sounds shop on Sandy Row. The drum features in the opening of her 1985 single "Running Up That Hill".

In the song "Madame George" on his album Astral Weeks, Van Morrison sings:

Then you know you gotta go
On that train from Dublin up to Sandy Row

— Van Morrison, "Madame George" (1968)
