= Ralph Smith Cusack =

Chairman of Irish railway company (1821–1910)

Sir Ralph Smith Cusack
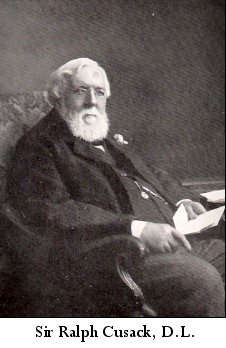
- Born: November 16, 1821
- Died: March 3, 1910 (aged 88)
- Occupation: Chairman
- Organization: Midland Great Western Railway
- Relatives: Ralph Cusack (great-grandson)

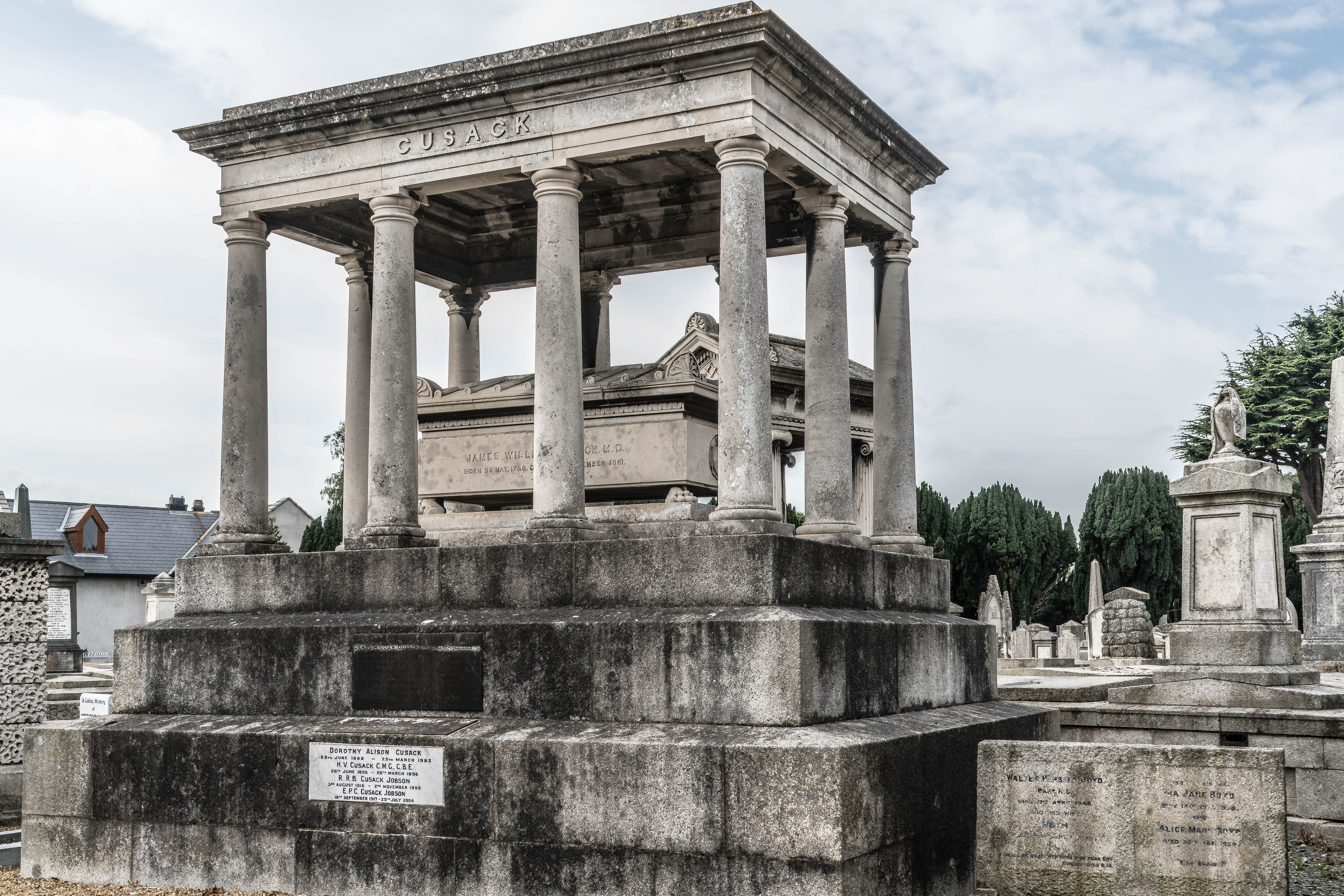
Cusack Vault in Mount Jerome Cemetery

Sir Ralph Smith Cusack was chairman of the Midland Great Western Railway (MGWR) of Ireland for forty years from 1865 to 1905.

== Life ==
Cusack was born on 16 November 1821, the son of James William Cusack, a Dublin surgeon, and Elizabeth Bernard. He held the sinecure office of Clerk of the Crown and Hanaper 1858-80.

He was educated at Trinity College, Dublin, graduating BA in 1845 and MA in 1849.v

Cusack was appointed to the board of MGWR in 1858, the company being in some turmoil at this time. Cusack accepted the chairmanship of the MGWR in 1865 following the reluctant two-day incumbency of William Maunsell, the company at that time incurring losses.

He married Elizabeth Barker, daughter of Richard Barker and had seven children. Cusack's youngest son, Henry Edward Cusack, had a fairly rapid rise to Locomotive Superintendent of the MGWR with Clements and McMahon suggesting the familial connection was likely to have been a factor. Cusack was the great-grandfather of Ralph Cusack.

Cusack finally retired as Chairman in 1904 after about 40 years aged 84, leaving the Company in a relatively good financial position though receipts were declining. He died on 3 March 1910.

=== Character ===
Shepherd describes Cusack's style as "although autocratic, he was fair-minded and generally liked by all ranks". Tatlow describes him as a "man of striking appearance", fluent, and with a good memory.
