= Jim Cusack =

Australian rules footballer (1930–2019)

Personal information
- Full name: James Ross Cusack
- Born: 2 November 1930
- Died: 29 November 2019 (aged 89)
- Original team: Warragul
- Height: 188 cm (6 ft 2 in)
- Weight: 80 kg (176 lb)

Playing career^{1}
Years	Club	Games (Goals)
1953	Fitzroy	2 (0)
- ^{1} Playing statistics correct to the end of 1953.

Jim Cusack (2 November 1930 – 29 November 2019) was an Australian rules footballer who played with Fitzroy in the Victorian Football League (VFL).
