= Michael Cusack (cyclist) =

Irish cyclist and author

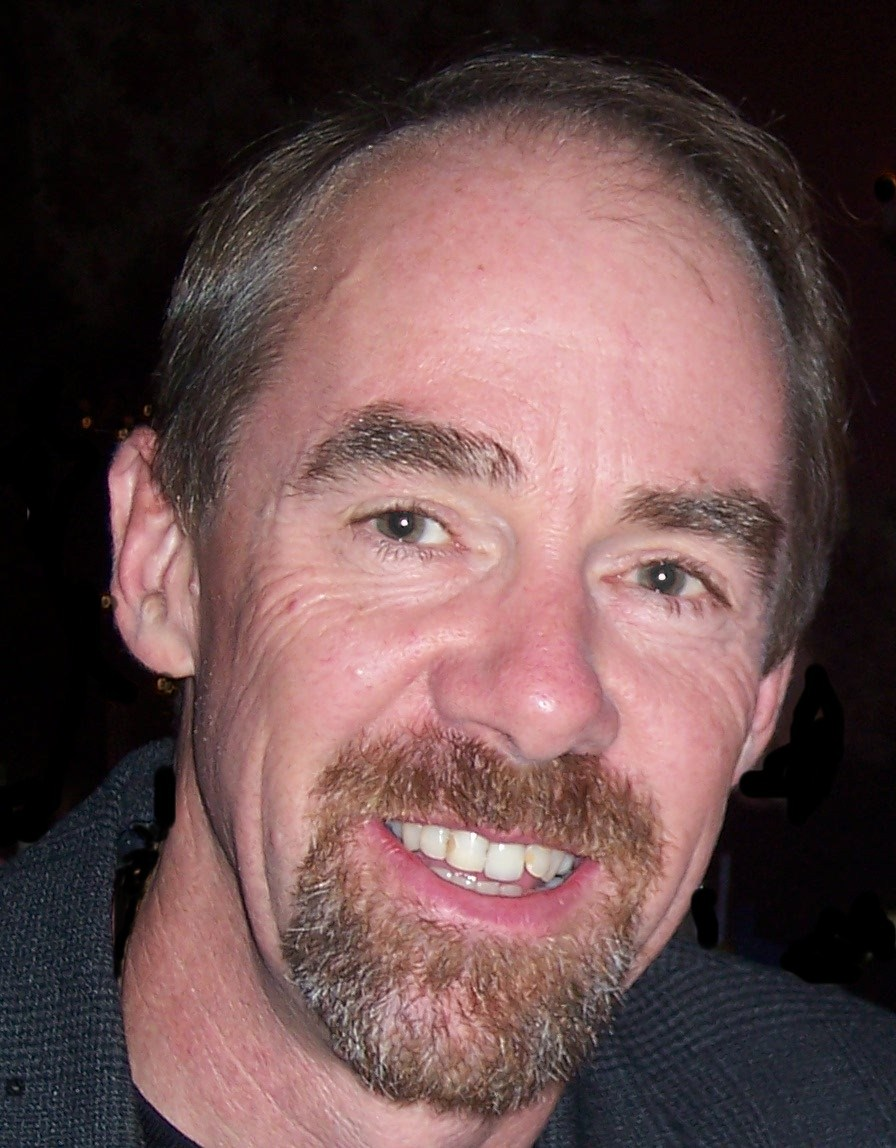
- Cusack in 2006

Personal information
- Nickname: Mick
- Born: 22 September 1955 (age 71) London, England
- Height: 179 cm (5 ft 10 in)
- Weight: 72 kg (159 lb)

Cycling career
- Sport: Cycling
- Discipline: Road racing
- Role: Consultant and author

Amateur team
- 1973–2025: Dublin Wheelers, Tailteann, Westport Covey Wheelers

Michael (Mick) William Cusack (born 22 September 1955) is an Irish international racing cyclist, author and speaker. He competed as a member of the Irish national cycle racing team from 1974 to 1978 and also at the Gran Fondo World Championships in 2022, 2023, 2024 and 2026. In 2025 he won the Irish Masters National Championship (M70) and in 2026 finished 5th in the Gran Fondo World Championships (Male 70–74) in Niseko, Japan.

== Background ==
Born in London, England, Cusack acquired Irish citizenship from his father, John Cusack, who was born and raised in Westport, County Mayo, Ireland. The family moved to Dublin, Ireland in 1964 and he was subsequently educated at Drimnagh CBS (beside Drimnagh Castle) and Templeogue College.

== Cycling career ==
Cusack began his cycling career in 1973 with the Dublin Wheelers Cycling Club. In 1974, he represented Ireland at the Isle of Man Cycling Week. Later that year, he joined the Tailteann racing team managed by John Lackey and was named to the Irish Olympic Squad for the 1976 Summer Olympics, along with Sean Kelly, Peter Morton, Alan McCormack, John Shortt, and Tony Lally. He rode his first amateur Tour of Ireland in the same year, finishing 39th in the eight-day race won by McQuaid. In 1976, he won his first senior road race, the Skerries Gran Prix near Dublin. Also in 1976, he was invited to race in the United States and Canada by the Raleigh-sponsored Century Road Club of America on a squad that included John Howard (cyclist) and John Allis. Cusack finished third in the Criterium de Montreal, Canada before returning to Ireland.

In 1978 Cusack won the Longford Two-Day race, following which he was named to the Irish team for the inaugural Tour of Europe, where he finished 36th after five days of racing from Reims through the Vosges Mountains to the finish in Strasbourg. On his return from Europe, he won several domestic races and represented Ireland along with Stephen Roche in the Tour of Ireland, where he finished third in the final stage outside Dublin. Cusack was then named to the initial Irish Olympic Squad for the 1980 Summer Olympics, along with Roche, Bernard McCormack, John Shortt and Alan McCormack, but did not compete there. He later retired from international events to focus on a copywriting career.

On April 24, 2022, he returned to racing by finishing fifth in the 65+ age category at a 125-kilometres Gran Fondo World Championship qualifying event near Morbisch Am See, Austria "UCI Gran Fondo World Series Qualified Riders Neusiedlersee Radmarathon". This result qualified him to represent Ireland at the 2022 Gran Fondo World Championships held in Trento, Italy on September 18, 2022, an event at which he finished in 28th place in the 65–69 age category after 88 kilometres of racing and over 2,300 metres of climbing, including the ascent of Monte Bodoni "2022 Gran Fondo World Championship Rankings". Cusack was featured in an article entitled 'A Decades Long Journey from Irish Olympic Squad to World Champs Participation'. In 2023, he won his age category in the UCI Gran Fondo Isle of Man and finished 2nd in the 2023 Cycling Ireland Masters Road Race National Championships and 45th in the 2023 UCI World Cycling Championships, held in Perth, Scotland.

In 2024, he qualified for the UCI World Championships by finishing 3rd in the 65-69 age category in Medio Fondo, Ireland. After crashing while training five days prior to the World Championships, Cusack finished in 68th position in Aalborg, Denmark. In November 2024, he repeated his 2023 win in the Male Over-60 category at the Westport Sea2Summit adventure race.

On April 12, 2025, Cusack qualified for his fourth consecutive UCI World Championships by finishing third in category at the Croatia Gran Fondo event. The race was won by the reigning world champion, Hans Taucher of Austria.

On August 23, 2025, Cusack won the Irish National Masters Championships in Emyvale, Monaghan in the M70 category. Six weeks later, he finished 4th in the M60 Irish National Hill Climb Championships and on November 8, 2025, he won the O70 category in the Sea2Summit adventure race. He was later awarded Male Rider of the Year by Connacht Cycling. Cusack was interviewed by Anthony Walsh as part of The Roadman Podcast series. On August 30, 2026, Cusack finished fifth in the UCI Gran Fondo World Championships Male 70–74 in Niseko, Japan. Two weeks later, on September 13, 2026, he finished second in the Irish National Masters Championship M70 in Waterford.

=== Major results ===
- 3rd Douglas Gran Prix, Douglas, Isle of Man (1974)
- 1st Skerries Gran Prix, Dublin, Ireland (1975)
- 1st Dublin-Longford Two-Day (1978)
- 4th Irish National Senior Road Race Championships (1978)
- 9th Tour of the Cotswolds International Star Trophy Race (1978)
- 1st Carrick-on-Suir Gran Prix (1978)
- 1st Tour of Clondalkin (1978)
- 1st Mullingar Road Race (1978)
- 3rd Tour of Ireland, Stage 8 Dublin, Ireland (1978)
- 1st Male Over-50 Sea2Summit Adventure Race, Westport, Ireland (2017)
- 5th Gran Fondo World Championship Qualifier 65+ Age Category Morbisch Am See, Austria (2022)
- 1st UCI Isle of Man Gran Fondo World Championship Qualifier 65+ Age Category, UK (2023)
- 2nd Cycling Ireland Masters Road Race National Championships (2023)
- 3rd UCI Gran Fondo World Championship Qualifier 65+ Age Category, Ireland (2024)
- 1st Male Over-60 Sea2Summit Adventure Race, Westport, Ireland (2024)
- 3rd UCI Gran Fondo World Championship Qualifier M70+ Age Category, Croatia (2025)
- 1st Irish National Masters Championship, M70+ Age Category, Monaghan (2025)
- 1st Male Over-70 Sea2Summit Adventure Race, Westport, Ireland (2025)
- 5th UCI Gran Fondo World Championships Male 70–74, Niseko, Japan (2026)
- 2nd Irish National Masters Championship, M70+ Age Category, Waterford (2026)

== Professional career ==
As a copywriter, Cusack won "Best Newcomer to Irish Advertising" at the Irish Advertising Awards Festival (IAAF) in 1980. After living in Vienna, Austria, he spent two years working in Khamis Mushayt, Saudi Arabia before travelling throughout India, Nepal, China, Mongolia and Russia. He emigrated to the United States in 1985 and studied creative writing at New England College, New Hampshire. In 1991 he acquired a Master of Arts degree in Corporate and Organizational Communications from Fairleigh Dickinson University and in 1992 he was appointed as a consultant for the AT&T Artificial Intelligence group and Bell Laboratories. The same year, he was a delegate to the Conference on Artificial Intelligence in Sydney. He was the keynote speaker at Contact Centre World 2001 in Singapore.

== Publications ==
The American Society for Quality published his first book, "Online Customer Care", in 1998, and he subsequently penned "Behind the Yellow Jersey – Racing in the Shadows of Kelly and Roche" (Hardcover 2022), which describes his final season at international level. His business books include "Conducting a Contact Center Assessment" (2013) and "Customer Service 2020 – Assessing Your Contact Center" (2018). He also selected poetry for "We Wished for the Cloths of Heaven" (2021).

He published "Croagh Patrick and the Islands of Clew Bay – A Guide to the Edge of Europe", which he presented publicly in July 2017 in a lecture entitled Beautiful Clew Bay.
