= Ulster =

Traditional province in the north of Ireland

Coordinates: 54.4°N 7.0°W

Ulster Ulaidh (Irish) Ulstèr (Ulster-Scots)
- Flag Coat of arms

- Sovereign states: United Kingdom (GBR); Republic of Ireland (IRL)
- Counties (9): List: GBR – Northern Ireland (NI): Antrim; Armagh; Down; Fermanagh; Londonderry; Tyrone; IRL: Cavan; Donegal; Monaghan

Government
  - MPs (GBR) and TDs (IRL): List: 7 Sinn Féin MPs; 5 DUP MPs; 2 SDLP MPs; 1 Alliance MP; 1 UUP MP; 1 TUV MP; 1 Independent MP; 4 Sinn Féin TDs; 4 Fianna Fáil TDs; 1 Fine Gael TD; 1 100% Redress TD
  - MLAs (NI only): List: 27 Sinn Féin MLAs; 25 DUP MLAs; 8 SDLP MLAs; 9 UUP MLAs; 17 Alliance MLAs; 1 PBP MLA; 1 TUV MLA; 4 Independent MLAs
  - MEPs^{[b]} (IRL only): List: 1 Sinn Féin MEP; 2 Fine Gael MEPs; 1 Independent MEP
  - Councillors: List: GBR – in Northern Ireland; 144 Sinn Féin; 122 DUP; 67 Alliance; 54 UUP; 39 SDLP; 9 TUV; 5 Green; 2 People Before Profit; 1 PUP; 19 Independent; in Republic of Ireland; 24 Fianna Fáil; 17 Sinn Féin; 17 Fine Gael; 1 Labour; 1 Aontú; 13 Independent

Area
  - Total: 22,067 km^{2} (8,520 sq mi)
  - Rank: 2nd

Population (2022 estimate^{[a]})
  - Total: 2,217,176
  - Rank: 2nd
  - Density: 100.47/km^{2} (260.23/sq mi)
- Time zone: UTC±0 (GMT/WET)
  - Summer (DST): UTC+1 (BST/IST)
- Postcodes: Northern Ireland: BT; Donegal: Eircodes beginning with F Cavan and Monaghan: Eircodes beginning with A or H7
- Telephone area codes: Northern Ireland: 028 (from Great Britain); 048 (from Republic of Ireland) +44-28 (from rest of world); Donegal: +353-74; Cavan and Monaghan: +353-4x
- ISO 3166 code: IE-U (Republic of Ireland); GB-NIR (Northern Ireland)
- Patron saints: Finnian of Moville and Columba a. The Northern Ireland Statistics and Research Agency census of 2021 results (1,903,100) combined with the preliminary results of 2022 census of Ireland for Ulster (part of; 314,076). b. The counties of Cavan, Monaghan and Donegal are part of the Midlands–North-West constituency (5 MEPs); these three counties contain 19.5% of the population of the constituency. Following Brexit, as the United Kingdom left the EU, there are no MEPs from Northern Ireland.

Ulster (/ˈʌlstər/; Irish: Ulaidh [ˈʊlˠiː, ˈʊlˠə] or Cúige Uladh [ˌkuːɟə ˈʊlˠə, - ˈʊlˠuː]; Ulster Scots: Ulstèr or Ulster) is one of the four historical provinces of Ireland, located in the northern part of the island. It is made up of nine counties, with six of these comprising Northern Ireland (a part of the United Kingdom), while the remaining three are in the Republic of Ireland.

It is the second-largest (after Munster) and second-most populous (after Leinster) of Ireland's four traditional provinces, with Belfast being its biggest city. Unlike the other provinces, Ulster has a high percentage of Protestants, making up almost half of its population. English is the main language and Ulster English the main dialect. A minority also speak Irish, and there are Gaeltachtaí (Irish-speaking regions) in County Donegal which is home to a quarter of the total Gaeltacht population of the Republic of Ireland. There are also large Irish-speaking networks in southern County Londonderry and in the Gaeltacht Quarter, Belfast. Ulster-Scots is also spoken extensively in the counties Antrim, Down, Londonderry, Tyrone and Donegal. Lough Neagh, in the east, is the largest lake in the British Isles, while Lough Erne in the west is one of its largest lake networks. The main mountain ranges are the Mournes, Sperrins, Blue Stack (Croaghgorms) and Derryveagh Mountains.

Historically, Ulster lay at the heart of the Gaelic world made up of Ireland, Scotland and the Isle of Man. According to tradition, in ancient Ireland it was one of the fifths (Irish: cúige) ruled by a rí ruirech, or 'king of over-kings'. It is named after the overkingdom of Ulaid, in the east of the province, which was in turn named after the Ulaid folk. The other overkingdoms in Ulster were Airgíalla and Ailech. After the Norman invasion of Ireland in the twelfth century, eastern Ulster was conquered by the Anglo-Normans and became the Earldom of Ulster. By the late fourteenth century the Earldom had collapsed and the O'Neill dynasty under Niall Noígíallach had come to dominate most of Ulster, claiming the title King of Ulster. Ulster became the most thoroughly Gaelic and independent of Ireland's provinces. Its rulers resisted English encroachment but were defeated in the Nine Years' War (1594–1603). King James I then colonised Ulster with Lowland Scottish and Northern English Protestant settlers from Great Britain, in the Plantation of Ulster. This led to the founding of many of Ulster's towns. The inflow of Protestant settlers and migrants also led to bouts of sectarian violence with Catholics, notably during the 1641 rebellion and the Armagh disturbances.

Along with the rest of Ireland, Ulster became part of the United Kingdom in 1801. In the early twentieth century, moves towards Irish self-rule were opposed by many Ulster Protestants, sparking the Home Rule Crisis. In the last all Ireland election (1918 Irish general election) counties Donegal and Monaghan returned large Sinn Féin (nationalist) majorities. Sinn Féin candidates ran unopposed in Cavan. Fermanagh and Tyrone had Sinn Féin/Nationalist Party (Irish Parliamentary Party) majorities. The other four Counties of Ulster had Unionist Party majorities. The home rule crisis and the subsequent Irish War of Independence led to the partition of Ireland under the Government of Ireland Act 1920. Six Ulster counties became Northern Ireland, a self-governing territory within the United Kingdom, while the rest of Ireland became the Irish Free State, now the Republic of Ireland.

The term Ulster has no official function for local government purposes in either state. However, for the purposes of ISO 3166-2:IE, Ulster is used to refer to the three counties of Cavan, Donegal and Monaghan only, which are given country sub-division code "IE-U". The name is also used by various organisations such as cultural and sporting bodies.

== Terminology ==
Ulster's name ultimately derives from the Ulaidh, a group of tribes that once dwelt in this part of Ireland. The Norsemen knew the province as Ulaztir, the tír or land (a word borrowed from Irish) of the Ulaidh; this was then taken into English as Ullister or Ulvester, and later contracted to Ulster. Another, less probable explanation is that the suffix -ster represents the Old Norse element staðr ("place"), found in names like Lybster and Scrabster in Scotland.

Ulster is still known as Cúige Uladh in Irish, meaning the province (literally "fifth") of the Ulaidh. Ulaidh has historically been anglicised as Ulagh or Ullagh and Latinised as Ulidia or Ultonia. The latter two have yielded the terms Ulidian and Ultonian. The Irish word for someone or something from Ulster is Ultach, and this can be found in the surnames MacNulty, MacAnulty, and Nulty, which all derive from Mac an Ultaigh, meaning "son of the Ulsterman".

Northern Ireland is often referred to as Ulster, despite including only six of Ulster's nine counties. This usage is most common among people in Northern Ireland who are unionist, although it is also used by the media throughout the United Kingdom. Some Irish nationalists object to the use of Ulster in this context.

== Geography and political sub-divisions ==
Ulster (coloured), showing Northern Ireland in pink and the Republic of Ireland part in green

Ulster has a population of just over two million people and an area of 22,067 square kilometres (8,520 sq mi). About 62% of the area of Ulster is in the UK while the remaining 38% is in the Republic of Ireland. Ulster's biggest city, Belfast, has an urban population of over half a million inhabitants, making it the second-largest city on the island of Ireland and the 10th largest urban area in the UK. Six of Ulster's nine counties, Antrim, Armagh, Down, Fermanagh, Londonderry and Tyrone, including the former parliamentary boroughs of Belfast and Londonderry, form Northern Ireland which remained part of the United Kingdom after the partition of Ireland in 1921. Three Ulster counties – Cavan, Donegal and Monaghan – form part of the Republic of Ireland. About half of Ulster's population lives in counties Antrim and Down. Across the nine counties, according to the aggregate UK 2011 Census for Northern Ireland, and the IRL 2011 Census for counties Cavan, Donegal and Monaghan, there is a Roman Catholic majority over Protestant of 50.8% to 42.7%.

While the traditional counties continue to demarcate areas of local government in the Republic of Ireland, this is no longer the case in Northern Ireland. Since 1974, the traditional counties have a ceremonial role only. Local government in Northern Ireland is now demarcated by 11 districts.

=== County-based sub-divisions ===
County	Population	Area
County Antrim	618,108	3,088 km^{2} (1,192 sq mi)
County Armagh	174,792	1,327 km^{2} (512 sq mi)
County Cavan	81,704	1,932 km^{2} (746 sq mi)
County Donegal	167,084	4,861 km^{2} (1,877 sq mi)
County Down	531,665	2,489 km^{2} (961 sq mi)
County Fermanagh	61,170	1,691 km^{2} (653 sq mi)
County Londonderry	247,132	2,118 km^{2} (818 sq mi)
County Monaghan	65,288	1,295 km^{2} (500 sq mi)
County Tyrone	177,986	3,266 km^{2} (1,261 sq mi)
Total	2,217,176	22,067 km^{2} (8,520 sq mi)

Counties shaded in grey are in the Republic of Ireland. Counties shaded in pink are in Northern Ireland.

=== Council-based sub-divisions ===
District	Council
County Cavan	Cavan County Council
County Donegal	Donegal County Council
County Monaghan	Monaghan County Council
Fermanagh and Omagh	Fermanagh and Omagh District Council
Derry and Strabane	Derry and Strabane District Council
Mid-Ulster	Mid-Ulster District Council
Causeway Coast and Glens	Causeway Coast and Glens District Council
Mid and East Antrim	Mid and East Antrim District Council
Antrim and Newtownabbey	Antrim and Newtownabbey Borough Council
Ards and North Down	Ards and North Down Borough Council
Armagh, Banbridge and Craigavon	Armagh, Banbridge and Craigavon District Council
Lisburn and Castlereagh	Lisburn and Castlereagh City Council
Newry, Mourne and Down	Newry, Mourne and Down District Council
Belfast	Belfast City Council

=== Largest settlements ===
Settlements in Ulster with at least 14,000 inhabitants, listed in order of population:

1. Belfast (480,000)
2. Derry (105,000)
3. Lisburn (75,000)
4. Craigavon (65,000)
5. Bangor (58,400)
6. Ballymena (28,700)
7. Newtownards (27,800)
8. Newry (27,400)
9. Carrickfergus (27,200)
10. Coleraine (25,000)
11. Antrim (20,000)
12. Omagh (19,800)
13. Letterkenny (19,600)
14. Larne (18,200)
15. Banbridge (14,700)
16. Armagh (14,500)

== Economy ==
The GDP of the province of Ulster is around €50 billion. Salary levels are the lowest on the island of Ireland.

Area	Population	Country	Largest settlement	GDP €	GDP per person €
Greater Belfast	720,000	NI	Belfast	€20.9 bn	€33,550
Border Region (includes two non-Ulster counties)	430,000 (roughly half in Ulster)	IRL	Letterkenny	€10.7 bn	€21,100
East of Northern Ireland	430,000	NI	Ballymena	€9.5 bn	€20,300
North of Northern Ireland	280,000	NI	Derry	€5.5 bn	€18,400
West and South of Northern Ireland	400,000	NI	Newry	€8.4 bn	€19,300

== Physical geography ==
The biggest lake in the British Isles, Lough Neagh, lies in eastern Ulster. The province's highest point, Slieve Donard (848 metres (2,782 ft)), stands in County Down. The most northerly point in Ireland, Malin Head, is in County Donegal, as are the sixth-highest (601 metres (1,972 ft)) sea cliffs in Europe, at Slieve League, and the province's largest island, Arranmore. The most easterly point in Ireland is also in Ulster, in County Down, and the most westerly point in the UK is in County Fermanagh. The longest river in the British Isles, the Shannon, rises at the Shannon Pot in County Cavan with underground tributaries from County Fermanagh. Volcanic activity in eastern Ulster led to the formation of the Antrim Plateau and the Giant's Causeway, one of Ireland's three UNESCO World Heritage Sites. Ulster also has a significant drumlin belt. The geographical centre of Ulster lies between the villages of Pomeroy and Carrickmore in County Tyrone. In terms of area, County Donegal is the largest county in all of Ulster.

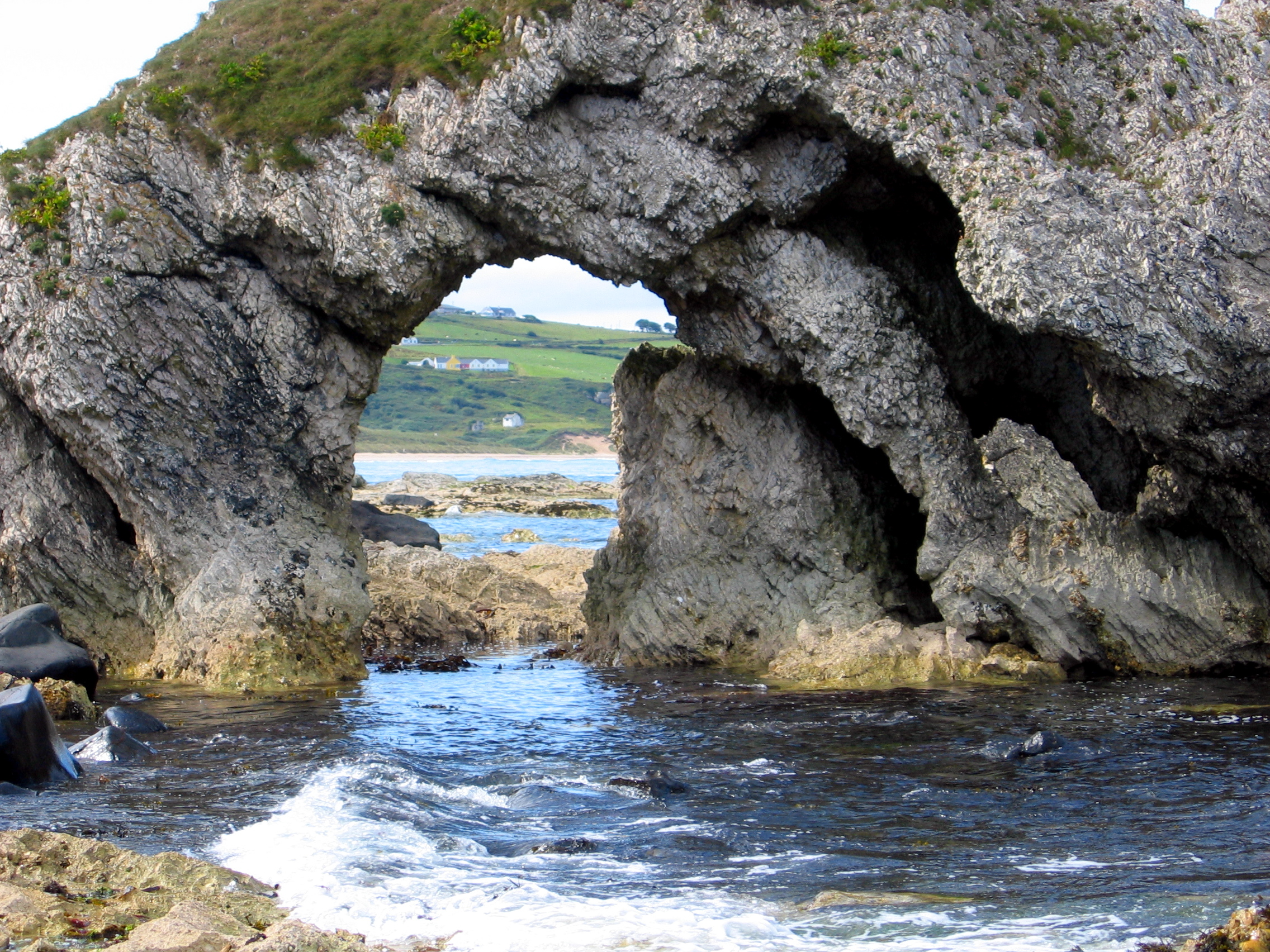
At White Park Bay

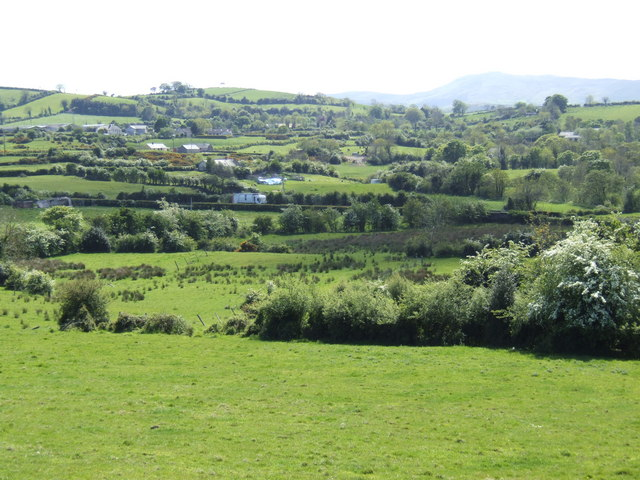
Countryside west of Ballynahinch

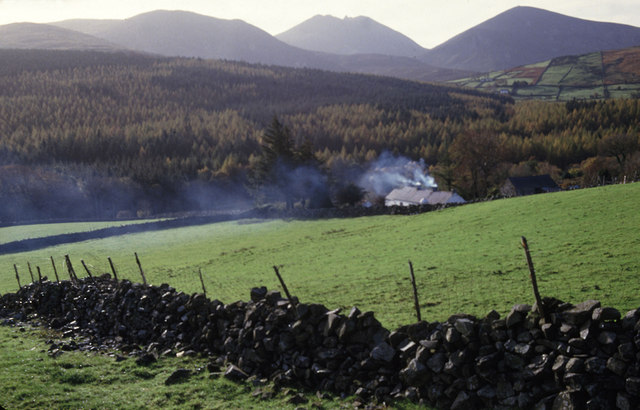
Mourne country cottage

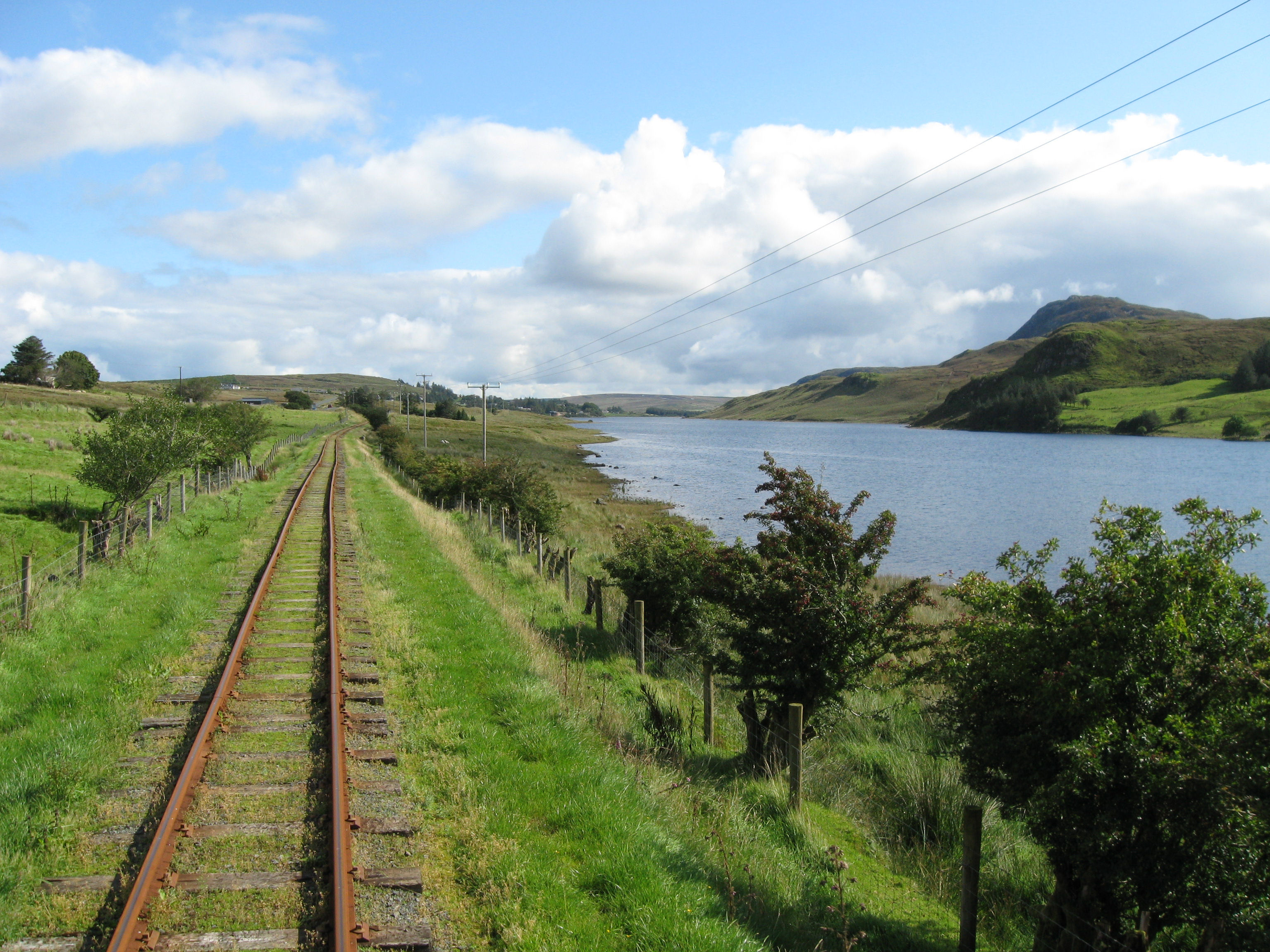
The track of the County Donegal Railways Joint Committee (CDRJC) restored next to Lough Finn, near Fintown station.

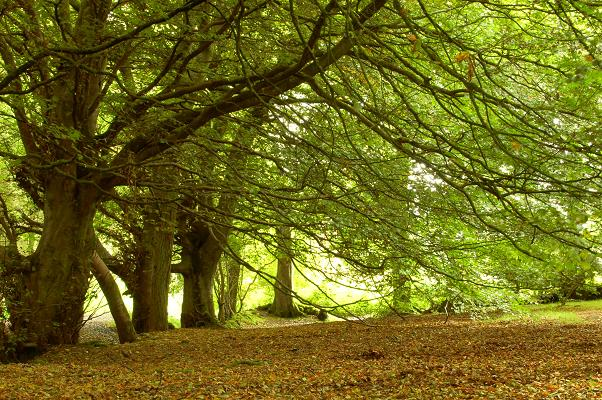
The approach of autumn, Tardree forest

== Transport ==
=== Air ===
The province's main airport is Belfast International Airport (popularly called Aldergrove Airport), which is located at Aldergrove, 11.5 miles northwest of Belfast near Antrim. George Best Belfast City Airport (sometimes referred to as "the City Airport" or "the Harbour Airport") is another, smaller airport which is located at Sydenham in Belfast. The City of Derry Airport is located at Eglinton, 13 kilometres (8 mi) east of the city of Derry. There is also Donegal Airport (Irish: Aerfort Dhún na nGall), popularly known as Carrickfinn Airport, which is located in The Rosses.

=== Rail ===
Railway lines are run by NI Railways (NIR). Belfast to Bangor and Belfast to Lisburn are strategically the most important routes on the network with the greatest number of passengers and largest profit margins. The Belfast-Derry railway line connecting Derry~Londonderry railway station, via Coleraine, Ballymoney, Ballymena and Antrim, with Lanyon Place and Belfast Grand Central is a noted scenic route. Belfast is also connected with Carrickfergus and Larne Harbour, Portadown, Newry and onwards, via the Enterprise service jointly operated by NIR and Iarnród Éireann, to Dublin Connolly.

The main railway lines linking to and from Belfast Grand Central and Belfast Lanyon Place are:

- The Derry Line and the Portrush Branch
- The Larne Line
- The Bangor Line
- The Portadown Line

Only five Irish counties, all in Southern and Western Ulster, currently have no mainline railway. The historic Great Northern Railway of Ireland connected them. They are Cavan, Monaghan, Fermanagh, Tyrone and Donegal. A plan to re-link Sligo and Derry through Donegal has been postponed until at least 2030.

== Languages and dialects ==
Most people in Ulster speak English. English is taught in all schools in the province; Irish (Gaeilge) is taught in all schools in the counties that are part of the Republic, and in schools in Northern Ireland, almost exclusively in the Roman Catholic and Irish-medium sectors. In responses to the 2001 census in Northern Ireland 10% of the population had "some knowledge of Irish" and 4.7% could "speak, read, write and understand" Irish. Large parts of County Donegal are Gaeltacht areas where Irish is the first language and some people in west Belfast also speak Irish, especially in the "Gaeltacht Quarter". The dialect of Irish most commonly spoken in Ulster (especially throughout Northern Ireland and County Donegal) is Gaeilge Thír Chonaill or Donegal Irish, also known as Gaeilge Uladh or Ulster Irish. Donegal Irish has many similarities to Scottish Gaelic. Polish is the third most common language. Ulster Scots dialects, sometimes known by the neologism Ullans, are also spoken in Counties Down, Antrim, Londonderry and Donegal.

== History ==
=== Early history ===
Ulster is one of the four Irish provinces. Its name derives from the Irish language Cúige Uladh (pronounced [ˌkuːɟə ˈʊlˠə]), meaning 'fifth of the Ulaidh', named for the ancient inhabitants of the region.

The province's early story extends further back than written records and survives mainly in legends such as the Ulster Cycle. The archaeology of Ulster, formerly called Ulandia, gives examples of "ritual enclosures", such as the Giant's Ring near Belfast, which is an earth bank about 590 feet (180 m) in diameter and 15 feet (4.5 m) high, in the centre of which there is a dolmen.

The Boyne and its tributary the Blackwater were the traditional southern boundary of the province of Ulster and appear as such in the Táin Bó Cúailnge. According to historian Francis John Byrne the Ulaid 'possibly still ruled directly in Louth as far as the Boyne in the early seventh century' when Congal Cáech made a bid for the kingship of Tara. In 637, the Battle of Moira, known archaically as the Battle of Magh Rath, was fought by the Gaelic High King of Ireland Domhnall II against his foster son King Congal Cáech of Ulster, supported by his ally Domhnall the Freckled (Irish: Domhnall Brecc) of Dalriada. The battle was fought near the Woods of Killultagh, just outside the village of Moira in what would become County Down. It was allegedly the largest battle ever fought on the island of Ireland, and resulted in the death of Congal and the retreat of Domhnall Brecc.

In early medieval Ireland, a branch of the Northern Uí Néill, the Cenél nEógain of the province of Ailech, gradually eroded the territory of the province of Ulaidh until it lay east of the River Bann. The Cenél nEógain would make Tír Eóghain (most of which forms modern County Tyrone) their base. Among the High Kings of Ireland were Áed Findliath (died 879), Niall Glúndub (died 919), and Domnall ua Néill (died 980), all of the Cenél nEógain. The province of Ulaidh would survive restricted to the east of modern Ulster until the Norman invasion in the late 12th century. It would only once more become a province of Ireland in the mid-14th century after the collapse of the Norman Earldom of Ulster, when the O'Neills who had come to dominate the Northern Uí Néill stepped into the power vacuum and staked a claim for the first time the title of "king of Ulster" along with the Red Hand of Ulster symbol. This symbol is rooted in ancient Gaelic Culture to symbolise a great warrior. It was then that the provinces of Ailech, Airgialla, and Ulaidh would all merge largely into what would become the modern province of Ulster.

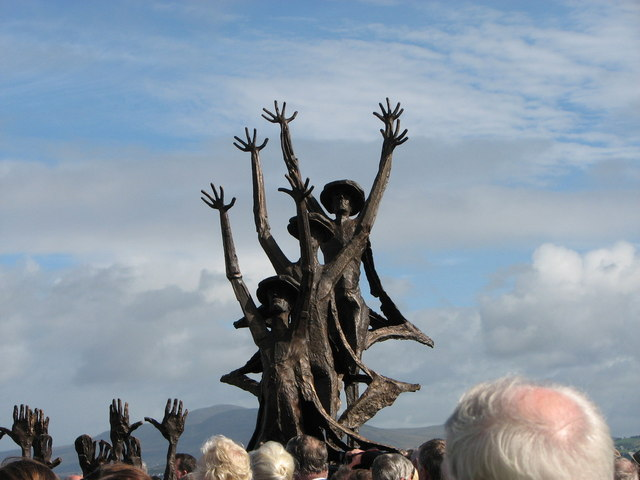
A bronze statue commemorating The Flight of the Earls at Rathmullan in north County Donegal.

Domnall Ua Lochlainn (died 1121) and Muirchertach Mac Lochlainn (died 1166) were of this dynasty. The Meic Lochlainn were in 1241 overthrown by their kin, the clan Ó Néill (see O'Neill dynasty). The Ó Néill's were from then on established as Ulster's most powerful Gaelic family.

The Ó Domhnaill (O'Donnell) dynasty were Ulster's second most powerful clan from the early thirteenth-century through to the beginning of the seventeenth-century. The O'Donnells ruled over Tír Chonaill (most of modern County Donegal) in West Ulster.

After the Norman invasion of Ireland in the twelfth century, the east of the province fell by conquest to Norman barons, first De Courcy (died 1219), then Hugh de Lacy (1176–1243), who founded the Earldom of Ulster based on the modern counties of Antrim and Down.

In the 1600s Ulster was the last redoubt of the traditional Gaelic way of life, and following the defeat of the Irish forces in the Nine Years War (1594–1603) at the battle of Kinsale (1601), Elizabeth I's English forces succeeded in subjugating Ulster and all of Ireland.

The Gaelic leaders of Ulster, the O'Neills and O'Donnells, finding their power under English suzerainty limited, decamped en masse in 1607 (the Flight of the Earls) to Roman Catholic Europe. This allowed the English Crown to plant Ulster with more loyal English and Scottish planters, a process which began in earnest in 1610.

=== Plantations and civil wars ===
The Plantation of Ulster (Irish: Plandáil Uladh) was the organised colonisation (or plantation) of Ulster by people from Great Britain (especially Presbyterians from Scotland). Private plantation by wealthy landowners began in 1606, while the official plantation controlled by King James I of England (who was also King James VI of Scotland) began in 1609. All land owned by Irish chieftains, the Ó Neills and Ó Donnells (along with those of their supporters), who fought against the English Crown in the Nine Years War, were confiscated and used to settle the colonists. The Counties Tyrconnell, Tyrone, Fermanagh, Cavan, Coleraine and Armagh comprised the official Colony. However, most of the counties, including the most heavily colonised Counties Antrim and Down, were privately colonised. These counties, though not officially designated as subject to Plantation, had suffered violent depopulation during the previous wars and proved attractive to Private Colonialists from nearby Britain. The efforts to attract colonists from England and Scotland to the Ulster Plantation were considerably affected by the existence of British colonies in the Americas, which served as a more attractive destination for many potential emigrants.

The official reason for the Plantation is said to have been to pay for the costly Nine Years' War, but this view was not shared by all in the English government of the time, most notably the English Crown-appointed Attorney-General for Ireland in 1609, Sir John Davies:

A barbarous country must be first broken by a war before it will be capable of good government; and when it is fully subdued and conquered, if it be not well planted and governed after the conquest, it will eftsoons return to the former barbarism.

The Plantation of Ulster continued well into the 18th century, interrupted only by the Irish Rebellion of 1641. This Rebellion was initially led by Sir Phelim O'Neill (Irish: Sir Féilim Ó Néill), and was intended to overthrow British rule rapidly, but quickly degenerated into attacks on colonists, in which dispossessed Irish slaughtered thousands of the colonists. In the ensuing wars (1641–1653, fought against the background of civil war in England, Scotland and Ireland), Ulster became a battleground between the Colonialists and the native Irish. In 1646, an Irish army under command by Owen Roe O'Neill (Irish: Eoghan Ruadh Ó Néill) inflicted a defeat on a Scottish Covenanter army at Benburb in County Tyrone, but the native Irish forces failed to follow up their victory and the war lapsed into stalemate. The war in Ulster ended with the defeat of the native army at the Battle of Scarrifholis, near Newmills on the western outskirts of Letterkenny, County Donegal, in 1650, as part of the Cromwellian conquest of Ireland conducted by Oliver Cromwell and the New Model Army, the aim of which was to expel all native Irish to the province of Connaught.

Forty years later, in 1688–1691, the Williamite War was fought, the belligerents of which were the Williamites and Jacobites. The war was partly due to a dispute over who was the rightful claimant to the British Throne, and thus the supreme monarch of the nascent British Empire. However, the war was also a part of the greater War of the Grand Alliance, fought between King Louis XIV of France and his allies, and a European-wide coalition, the Grand Alliance, led by Prince William of Orange and Emperor Leopold I of the Holy Roman Empire, supported by the Vatican and many other states. The Grand Alliance was a cross-denominational alliance designed to stop French eastward colonialist expansion under Louis XIV, with whom King James II was allied.

The majority of Irish people were "Jacobites" and supported James II due to his 1687 Declaration of Indulgence or, as it is also known, The Declaration for the Liberty of Conscience, that granted religious freedom to all denominations in England and Scotland and also due to James II's promise to the Irish Parliament of an eventual right to self-determination. However, James II was deposed in the Glorious Revolution, and the majority of Ulster Colonialists (Williamites) backed William of Orange. Both the Williamite and Jacobite armies were religiously mixed; William of Orange's own elite forces, the Dutch Blue Guards had a papal banner with them during the invasion, many of them being Dutch Roman Catholics.

At the start of the war, Irish Jacobites controlled most of Ireland for James II, with the exception of the Williamite strongholds at Derry and at Enniskillen in Ulster. The Jacobites besieged Derry from December 1688 to July 1689, ending when a Williamite army from Britain relieved the city. The Williamites based in Enniskillen defeated another Jacobite army at the battle of Newtownbutler on 28 July 1689. Thereafter, Ulster remained firmly under Williamite control and William's forces completed their conquest of the rest of Ireland in the next two years. The war provided Protestant loyalists with the iconic victories of the Siege of Derry, the Battle of the Boyne (1 July 1690) and the Battle of Aughrim (12 July 1691), all of which the Orange Order commemorate each year.

The Williamites' victory in this war ensured British rule in Ireland for over 200 years. The Protestant Ascendancy in Ireland excluded most of Ulster's population from having any Civil power on religious grounds. Roman Catholics (descended from the indigenous Irish) and Presbyterians (mainly descended from Scottish colonists) both suffered discrimination under the Penal Laws, which gave full political rights only to Anglican Protestants (mostly descended from English settlers). In the 1690s, Scottish Presbyterians became a majority in Ulster, due to a large influx of them into the Province.

=== Emigration ===
Considerable numbers of Ulster-Scots (who became commonly known as "Scots-Irish" in America) emigrated to the North American colonies throughout the 18th century (160,000 settled in what would become the United States between 1717 and 1770 alone).

Disdaining (or forced out of) the heavily English regions on the Atlantic coast, most groups of Ulster-Scots settlers crossed into the "western mountains", where their descendants populated the Appalachian regions and the Ohio Valley. Here they lived on the frontiers of America, carving their own world out of the wilderness. The Scots-Irish soon became the dominant culture of the Appalachians from Pennsylvania to Georgia. Author (and US Senator) Jim Webb puts forth a thesis in his book Born Fighting to suggest that the character traits he ascribes to the Scots-Irish such as loyalty to kin, mistrust of governmental authority, and a propensity to bear arms, helped shape the American identity.

In the United States Census, 2000, 4.3 million Americans claimed Scots-Irish ancestry. The areas where the most Americans reported themselves in the 2000 Census only as "American" with no further qualification (e.g. Kentucky, north-central Texas, and many other areas in the Southern US) are largely the areas where many Scots-Irish settled, and are in complementary distribution with the areas which most heavily report Scots-Irish ancestry.

According to the Harvard Encyclopedia of American Ethnic Groups, 400,000 people in the US were of Irish birth or ancestry in 1790 when the first US Census counted 3,100,000 white Americans. According to the encyclopaedia, half of these Irish Americans were descended from Ulster, and half from the other three provinces of Ireland.

=== Republicanism, rebellion and communal strife ===
Most of the 18th century saw a calming of sectarian tensions in Ulster. The economy of the province improved, as small producers exported linen and other goods. Belfast developed from a village into a bustling provincial town. However, this did not stop many thousands of Ulster people from emigrating to British North America in this period, where they became known as "Scots Irish" or "Scotch-Irish".

Political tensions resurfaced, albeit in a new form, towards the end of the 18th century. In the 1790s many Roman Catholics and Presbyterians, in opposition to Anglican domination and inspired by the American and French revolutions joined in the United Irishmen movement. This group (founded in Belfast) dedicated itself to founding a non-sectarian and independent Irish republic. The United Irishmen had particular strength in Belfast, Antrim and Down. Paradoxically however, this period also saw much sectarian violence between Roman Catholics and Protestants, principally members of the Church of Ireland (Anglicans, who practised the Established state religion and had rights denied to both Presbyterians and Roman Catholics), notably the "Battle of the Diamond" in 1795, a faction fight between the rival "Defenders" (Roman Catholic) and "Peep O'Day Boys" (Anglican), which led to over 100 deaths and to the founding of the Orange Order. This event, and many others like it, came about with the relaxation of the Penal Laws and Roman Catholics began to be allowed to purchase land and involve themselves in the linen trade (activities which previously had involved many onerous restrictions). Protestants, including some Presbyterians, who in some parts of the province had come to identify with the Roman Catholic community, used violence to intimidate Roman Catholics who tried to enter the linen trade. Estimates suggest that up to 7000 Roman Catholics suffered expulsion from Ulster during this violence. Many of them settled in northern Connacht. These refugees' linguistic influence still survives in the dialects of Irish spoken in County Mayo, which have many similarities to Ulster Irish not found elsewhere in Connacht. Loyalist militias, primarily Anglicans, also used violence against the United Irishmen and against Roman Catholic and Protestant republicans throughout the province.

In 1798 the United Irishmen, led by Henry Joy McCracken, launched a rebellion in Ulster, mostly supported by Presbyterians. But the British authorities swiftly put down the rebellion and employed severe repression after the fighting had ended. In the wake of the failure of this rebellion, and following the gradual abolition of official religious discrimination after the Act of Union in 1800, Presbyterians came to identify more with the State and with their Anglican neighbours, due to their civil rights now being respected by both the state and their Anglican neighbours.

The 1859 Ulster Revival was a major Christian revival that spread throughout Ulster.

=== Industrialisation, Home Rule and partition ===
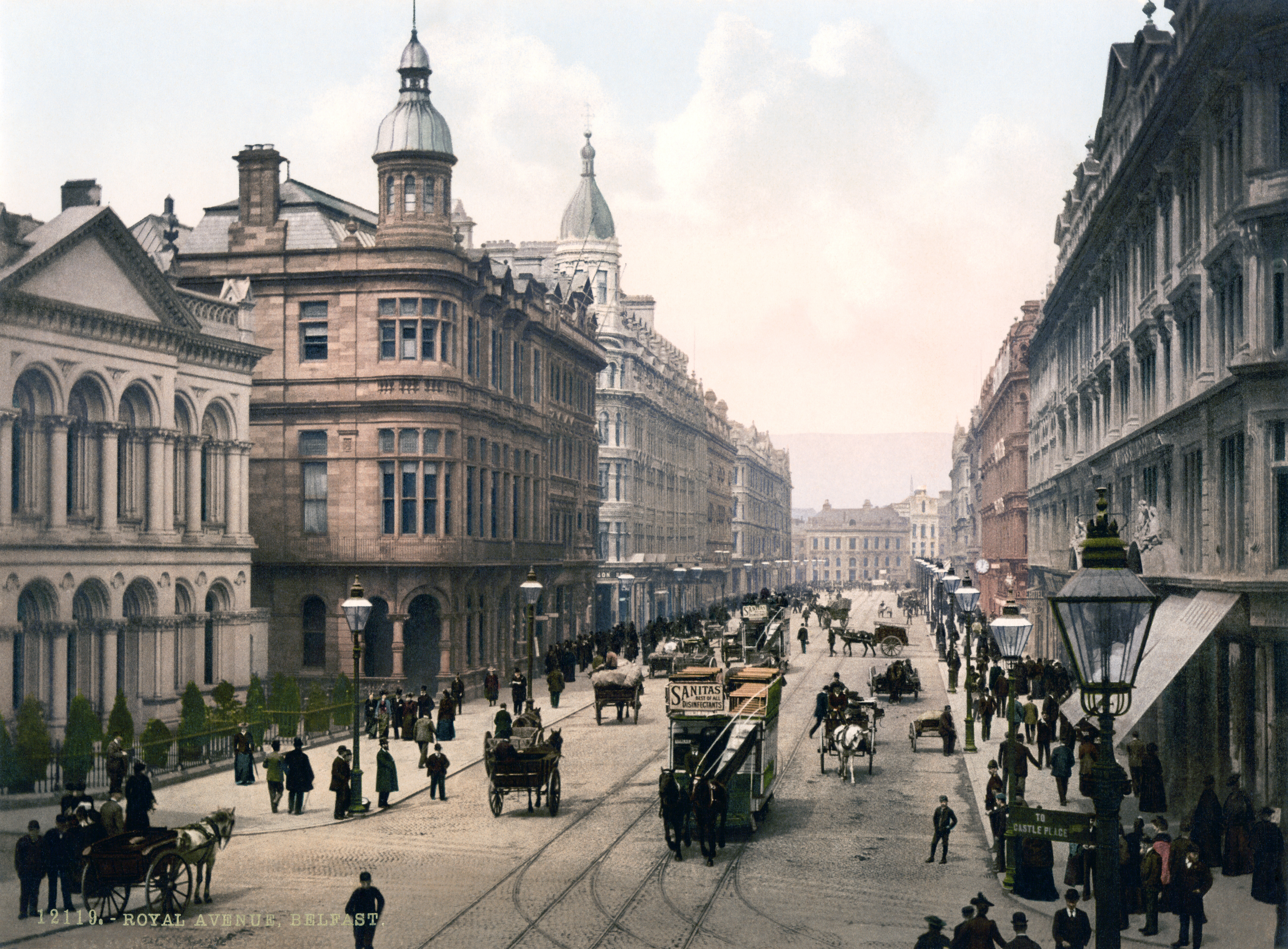
Royal Avenue, Belfast. Photochrom print c. 1890–1900.

In the 19th century, Ulster had the only large-scale industrialisation and became the most prosperous province on the island. In the latter part of the century, Belfast briefly overtook Dublin as the island's largest city. This growth was driven by the emergence of global industrial leaders, most notably the shipyard of Harland & Wolff. Founded in 1861 by Edward James Harland and Gustav Wilhelm Wolff, the yard became the world's most productive shipbuilder, employing over 30,000 people at its peak. This massive industrial complex necessitated a vast energy supply, leading to the rise of the Belfast coal trade. John Kelly Limited, established in 1840 by coal merchant Samuel Kelly as Samuel Kelly Limited, grew to become the largest coal importer in Ireland. The Kelly family operated a fleet of freight and steam locally known as "Kelly’s Coal Boats"—that created a literal bridge between the coalfields of Great Britain and the furnaces of Belfast. Belfast became famous in this period for its huge dockyards and shipbuilding – and notably for the construction of the RMS Titanic. Many of the industrial trades and merchants sat along the lagan, including Donegall Quay, Queen's Quay and the reclaimed land known as Queen's Island.

Sectarian divisions in Ulster became hardened into the political categories of unionist (supporters of the Union with Britain; mostly, but not exclusively, Protestant) and nationalist (advocates of repeal of the 1800 Act of Union, usually, though not exclusively, Roman Catholic). Northern Ireland's current politics originate from these late 19th century disputes over Home Rule that would have devolved some powers of government to Ireland. At least a dozen large scale sectarian disturbances/riots occurred in Belfast during the 19th century. Ulster Protestants usually opposed Home Rule — fearing for their religious rights calling it "Rome Rule" in an autonomous Roman Catholic-dominated Ireland and also not trusting politicians from the agrarian south and west to support the more industrial economy of Ulster. This lack of trust, however, was largely unfounded as during the 19th and early 20th century important industries in the southernmost region of Cork included brewing, distilling, wool and like Belfast, shipbuilding.

The results of the 1918 Irish general election, in which Sinn Féin and the Irish Parliamentary Party won the majority of votes on the island of Ireland, shown in the color green and light green respectively, with the exception being primarily in the East of the province of Ulster.

Thousands of unionists, led by the Dublin-born barrister Sir Edward Carson and James Craig, signed the "Ulster Covenant" of 1912 pledging to resist Home Rule. This movement also set up the Ulster Volunteer Force (UVF). In April 1914, the UVF assisted with the landing of 30,000 German rifles with 3,000,000 rounds at Larne by blockading authorities. (See Larne gunrunning). The Curragh Incident showed it would be difficult to use the British army to enforce home rule from Dublin on Ulster's unionist minority.

In response, Irish republicans created the Irish Volunteers, part of which became the forerunner of the Irish Republican Army (IRA) – to seek to ensure the passing of the Home Rule Bill. Upon the outbreak of World War I in 1914, 200,000 Irishmen, both Southern and Northern, of all religious sects volunteered to serve in the British Army. This had the effect of interrupting the armed stand-off in Ireland. As the war progressed, in Ireland, opposition to the War grew stronger, reaching its peak in 1918 when the British government proposed laws to extend conscription to all able bodied Irishmen during the Conscription Crisis.

In the aftermath of World War I, the political party Sinn Féin ("Ourselves") won the majority of votes in the 1918 Irish general election, this political party pursued a policy of complete independent self-determination for the island of Ireland as outlined in the Sinn Féin campaign Manifesto of 1918, a great deal more than the devolved government/Home Rule advocated by the (I.P.P) Irish Parliamentary Party. Following the Sinn Féin victory in these elections the Irish Declaration of Independence was penned and Irish republicans launched a guerrilla campaign against British rule in what became the Irish War of Independence (January 1919 – July 1921). The fighting in Ulster during the Irish War of Independence generally took the form of street battles between Protestants and Roman Catholics in the city of Belfast. Estimates suggest that about 600 civilians died in this communal violence, the majority of them (58%) Roman Catholics (see The Troubles (1920–1922)). The IRA remained relatively quiescent in Ulster, with the exception of the south Armagh area, where Frank Aiken led it. A lot of IRA activity also took place at this time in County Donegal and the City of Derry, where one of the main Republican leaders was Peadar O'Donnell. Hugh O'Doherty, a Sinn Féin politician, was elected mayor of Derry at this time. In the First Dáil, which was elected in late 1918, Eoin Mac Néill served as the Sinn Féin T.D. for Londonderry City.

=== 1920 to present ===
Partition of Ireland, first mooted in 1912, was introduced with the enactment of the Government of Ireland Act 1920, which gave a form of "Home rule" self-government to two areas, Southern Ireland, with its capital at Dublin, and "Northern Ireland", consisting of six of Ulster's central and eastern counties, both within a continuing United Kingdom of Great Britain and Ireland. Dissatisfaction with this led to the Irish War of Independence, which formally ceased on 11 July 1921. Low-level violence, however, continued in Ulster, causing Michael Collins in the south to order a boycott of Northern products in protest at attacks on the Nationalist community there. The Partition was effectively confirmed by the Anglo-Irish Treaty of 6 December 1921. One of the primary stipulations of the treaty was the transformation of Ireland into a self-governing British dominion called the Irish Free State (which later became the sovereign Republic of Ireland), but with the option of a continuation of the home rule institution of Northern Ireland, still within the United Kingdom, if the Northern Ireland Parliament (already in existence) chose to opt out of the Irish Free State. All parties knew that this was certain to be the choice of the Ulster Unionists who had a majority in the parliament, and immediately on the creation of the Free State they resolved to leave it.

Following the Anglo Irish treaty, the exact border between the new dominion of the Irish Free State and the future Northern Ireland, if it chose to opt out, was to be decided by the Irish Boundary Commission. This did not announce its findings until 1925, when the line was again drawn around six of Ulster's nine counties, with no change from the partition of 1920.

Electorally, voting in the six Northern Ireland counties of Ulster tends to follow religious or sectarian lines; noticeable religious demarcation does not exist in the South Ulster counties of Cavan and Monaghan in the Republic of Ireland. County Donegal is largely a Roman Catholic county, but with a large Protestant minority. Generally, Protestants in Donegal vote for the political party Fine Gael ("Family of the Irish"). However, religious sectarianism in politics has largely disappeared from the rest of the Republic of Ireland. This was illustrated when Erskine H. Childers, a Church of Ireland member and Teachta Dála (TD, a member of the lower house of the National Parliament) who had represented Monaghan, won election as President after having served as a long-term minister under Fianna Fáil Taoisigh Éamon de Valera, Seán Lemass and Jack Lynch.

The Orange Order freely organises in counties Donegal, Cavan and Monaghan, with several Orange parades taking place throughout County Donegal each year. The only major Orange Order march in the Republic of Ireland takes place every July in the village of Rossnowlagh, near Ballyshannon, in the south of County Donegal.

As of 2017, Northern Ireland has seven Roman Catholic members of parliament, all members of Sinn Féin (of a total of 18 from the whole of Northern Ireland) in the British House of Commons at Westminster; and the other three counties have one Protestant T.D. of the ten it has elected to Dáil Éireann, the Lower House of the Oireachtas, the parliament of the Republic of Ireland. At present (August 2007) County Donegal sends six T.D.'s to Dáil Éireann. The county is divided into two constituencies: Donegal North-East and Donegal South-West, each with three T.D.'s. County Cavan and County Monaghan form the one constituency called Cavan-Monaghan, which sends five T.D.'s to the Dáil (one of whom is a Protestant).

The historic Flag of Ulster served as the basis for the Ulster Banner (often referred to as the Flag of Northern Ireland), which was the flag of the Government of Northern Ireland until the proroguing of the Stormont parliament in 1973.

== People ==
- William Sherard (1659–1728) was the first biologist in Ulster.
- Van Morrison (b.1945) musician.
- George Cassidy (1936-2024) jazz musician and music teacher
- Sir Samuel Kelly (1879 - 1937) coal merchant, established John Kelly Limited
- Samuel Kelly (1818–1877) coal merchant
- John Kelly (1840–1904) coal merchant

== Sport ==
The border has divided association football teams since 1921. The Irish Football Association (the I.F.A.) oversees the sport in N.I., while the Football Association of Ireland (the F.A.I.) oversees the sport in the Republic. As a result, separate international teams are fielded and separate championships take place (Irish Football League in Northern Ireland, League of Ireland in the rest of Ulster and Ireland). Anomalously, Derry City F.C. has played in the League of Ireland since 1985 due to crowd trouble at some of their Irish League matches prior to this. The other major Ulster team in the League of Ireland is Finn Harps of Ballybofey, County Donegal. When Derry City F.C. and Finn Harps play against each other, the game is usually referred to as a 'North-West Derby'. There have been cup competitions between I.F.A. and F.A.I. clubs, most recently the Setanta Sports Cup.

In Rugby union, the professional rugby team representing the province and the IRFU Ulster Branch, Ulster Rugby, compete in the United Rugby Championship along with teams from Wales, Scotland, Italy, South Africa and the other Irish Provinces (Leinster, Munster and Connacht). They also compete in Europe's main club rugby tournament, the European Rugby Champions Cup, which they won (as the Heineken Cup) back in 1999. Notable Ulster rugby players include Willy John McBride, Jack Kyle and Mike Gibson. The former is the most capped British and Irish Lion of all time, having completed four tours with the Lions in the sixties and seventies. At international level players from Ulster join with those from the other 3 provinces to form the island-wide Ireland team.

In Gaelic games (which include Gaelic football and hurling), Ulster counties play the Ulster Senior Football Championship and Ulster Senior Hurling Championship. In football, the main competitions in which they compete with the other Irish counties are the All-Ireland Senior Football Championship and National Football League, while the Ulster club champions represent the province in the All-Ireland Senior Club Football Championship. Hurling teams play in the All-Ireland Senior Hurling Championship, National Hurling League and All-Ireland Senior Club Hurling Championship. The whole province fields a team to play the other provinces in the Railway Cup in both football and hurling. Gaelic Football is by far the most popular of the GAA sports in Ulster but hurling is also played, especially in Antrim, Armagh, Londonderry, and Down.

The Ulster Hockey Union organises field hockey in the province and contributes substantially to the all-island hockey team.

Cricket is also played in Ulster, especially in Northern Ireland and East Donegal. Ulster enters two teams into the Interprovincial Series; the North Knights and the North West Warriors, who are the respective representative teams of the Northern Cricket Union (NCU) and the North West Cricket Union (NWCU).

Golf is, however, the most high-profile sport; Ulster has produced several reputable players over the years, from Fred Daly winning The Open Championship in 1947 at the Royal Liverpool Golf Club, Hoylake to most recently Rory McIlroy winning the US Open and Darren Clarke winning The Open Championship in 2011. Ulster also has another Major winner in Graeme McDowell, who also won the US Open in 2010. The Open Championship returned to Ulster, after 68 years, in 2019 at Royal Portrush Golf Club.

In horse racing, specifically National Hunt, Ulster has produced the most dominant jockey of all time, Tony McCoy. He was the first jockey to win the BBC Sports Personality of the Year award in 2010. The Ulster Derby is an annual flat race held at Down Royal Racecourse, Lisburn. It is the most prestioughous flat race in Northern Ireland. Prior to Down Royal, it was held at the Maze Racecourse. The tradition of horse racing in Down Royal dates back to 1685, following the issuance of a Royal Charter by King James II. This decree led to the establishment of the Down Royal Corporation of Horse Breeders, which formally organized the sport in the area.

Ulster-bred horses have succeeded in the sport after a long tradition of producing top-tier national hunt horses, including Cheltenham Gold Cup winners. Gold Cup winners include Bellshill, Native River and Imperial Commander.

In Dodgeball, the Northern Ireland Men’s team is a powerhouse, consistently medaling at the European Championships. They famously won Gold at the 2023 European Championships, defeating Austria in the final. The sport is overseen by Northern Ireland Dodgeball.

The Circuit of Ireland Rally is an annual automobile rally held in Ulster since 1931.

== See also ==
- Culture of Ulster
- Kings of Ulster
- List of Ulster-related topics
- Ulidia (kingdom)
- Ulster nationalism
- Ulster-Scots people
