= 1907 Belfast Dock strike =

- Royal Irish Constabulary Constable William Barrett being chaired by the striking workers through the streets of Belfast after his dismissal, August 1907
- Date: 26 April 1907 – 28 August 1907
- Location: Belfast, Ireland, UK
- Caused by: Poor working conditions; Lack of workers rights; Inability to unionise
- Goals: Improved working conditions; Granting of right to unionise
- Methods: Strikes, rallies, walkouts
- Result: Strikers go back to work; ITGWU formed

Parties
Workers Organizations: NUDL; Supported by: Belfast Labour movement; Independent Orange Order; Belfast Labour Party	Employers & Companies: Belfast Steamship Company; Supported by: Belfast Corporation; Royal Irish Constabulary; British Army; Irish Unionist Alliance

Lead figures
James Larkin; James Sexton	Tom Gallaher; Lord Mayor, Earl of Shaftesbury

The Belfast Dock strike or Belfast lockout took place in Belfast, Ireland from 26 April to 28 August 1907. The strike was called by Liverpool-born trade union leader James Larkin who had successfully organised the dock workers to join the National Union of Dock Labourers (NUDL). The dockers, both Protestant and Catholic, had gone on strike after their demand for union recognition was refused. They were soon joined by carters, shipyard workers, sailors, firemen, boilermakers, coal heavers, transport workers, and women from the city's largest tobacco factory. Most of the dock labourers were employed by powerful tobacco magnate Thomas Gallaher, chairman of the Belfast Steamship Company and owner of Gallaher's Tobacco Factory.

The Royal Irish Constabulary (RIC) later mutinied when ordered to escort the blackleg drivers of traction engines used to replace the striking carters. Order was eventually restored when British Army troops were deployed. Although largely unsuccessful, the dock strike led to the establishment of the Irish Transport and General Workers' Union.

Former Irish Labour Party leader Ruairi Quinn described the Belfast strike as having been a "major event in the early years of the trade union movement".

== Background to the strike ==
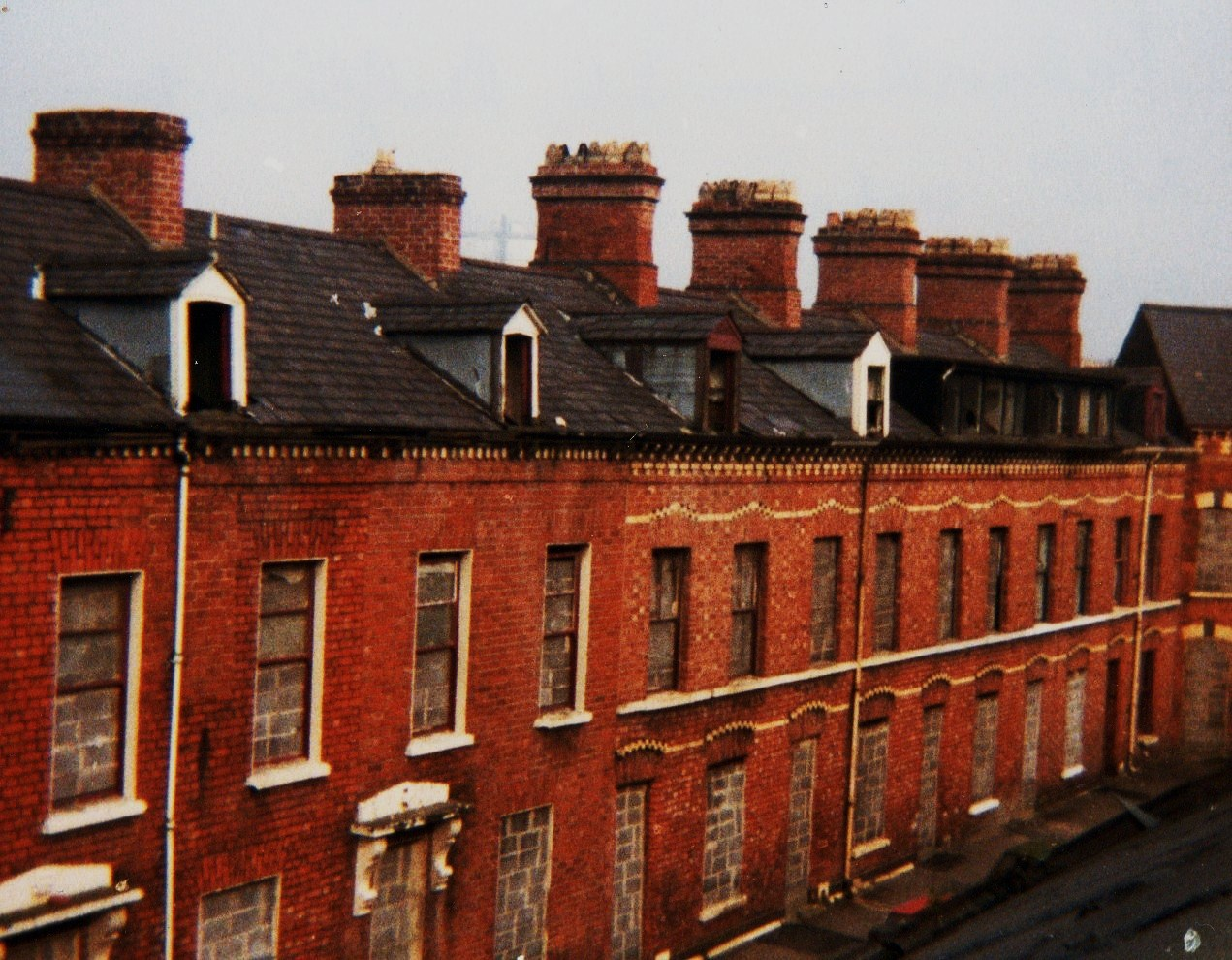
Belfast's working class population typically lived in red brick terraced houses similar to these in Pakenham Street, south Belfast

Belfast in the early 20th-century was a flourishing centre of industry with shipbuilding, engineering and linen-manufacturing the main sources of the city's economic lifeblood. Its skilled workforce of shipyard workers and engineers earned wages and enjoyed working conditions comparable with the rest of the United Kingdom. Additionally, they enjoyed the security of trade union membership. For the unskilled workers, such as dock labourers and carters, it was a completely different story. They worked up to 75 hours a week in conditions which were dangerous and unsanitary, without holidays. The pay was low and employment was erratic and uncertain. Unlike the skilled workers, these labourers had no trade union to look after their interests. The men who worked in the docks lived in Sailortown, a community adjacent to the Docks which had a population of 5,000, excluding the transient sailors who swelled the numbers. This mixed Protestant and Catholic populace was packed into tiny streets of red-bricked terraced houses that were built between the docks and York Street. They were damp, airless, overcrowded and poorly lit. Poverty, hunger and disease was rife. Women and children were compelled to work long, arduous hours in the linen mills and cigarette factories. Most families in Sailortown had men who were merchant seamen; with boys as young as 14 going off to sea. The other men obtained unskilled work on the waterfront as dockers, carters and coal heavers.

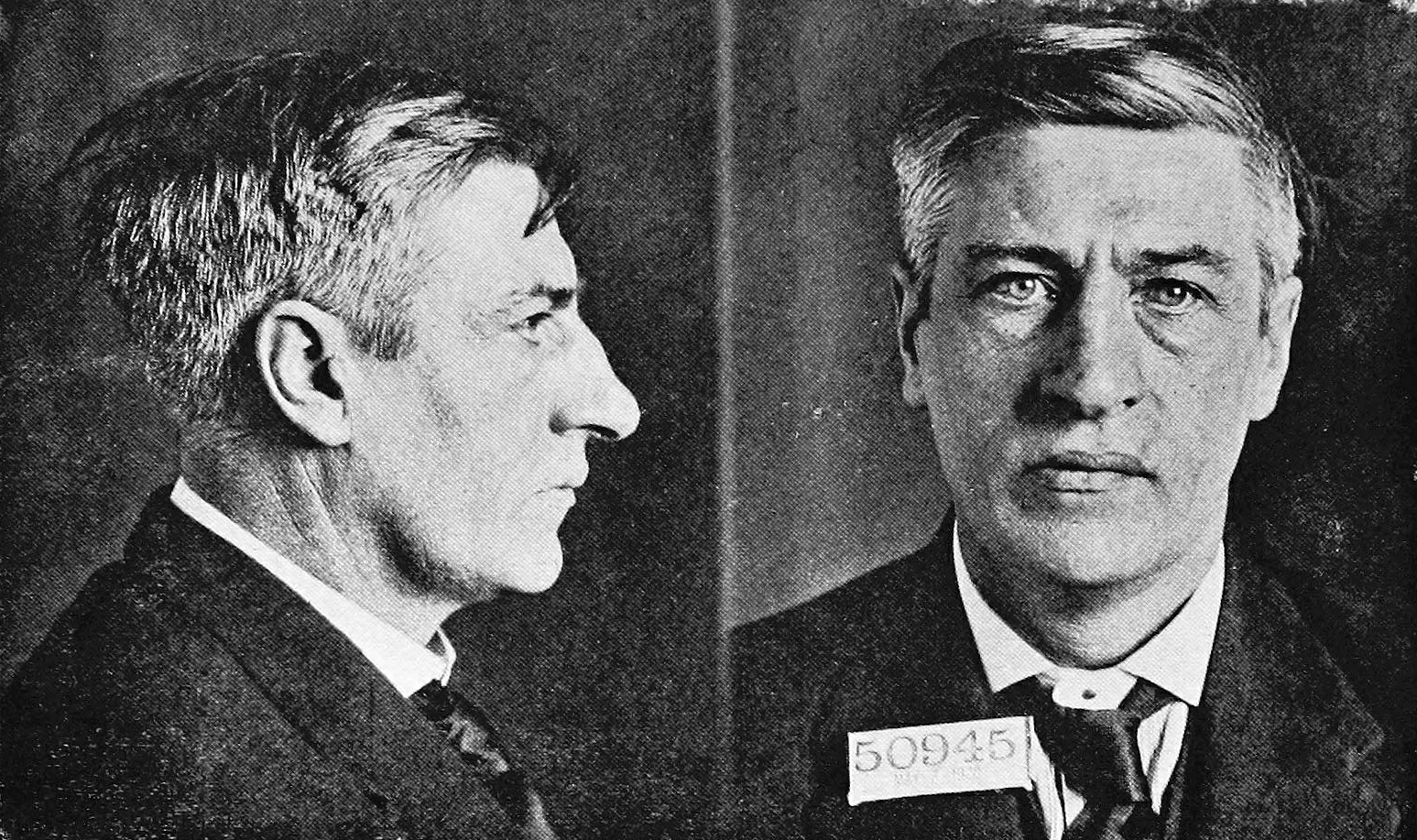
Trade union leader James Larkin organiser of the Dock strike

By this time there were 3,100 dock labourers, 2,000 of whom were casual workers or "spellsmen" hired on a daily basis at low pay. Whilst Protestants and Catholics held the same jobs, the sectarian attitudes which dominated every aspect of life in Belfast ensured that Protestant dockers worked in the cross-channel docks where employment was more regular whilst Catholic dockers were made to work in the more dangerous deep sea docks, where the casualty rate was the highest. They were also the first to be laid off when labour cutbacks were required. Author John Gray in his book, City in Revolt: James Larkin and the Belfast Dock Strike of 1907 described the differences in wages earnings and the standard of living between the skilled and unskilled workers as "a yawning abyss, unequalled anywhere else in the United Kingdom".

It was into this environment and social milieu that trade union leader James Larkin (a Liverpool-born Irish Catholic) arrived in January 1907. He was sent to Belfast by James Sexton, head of the National Union of Dock Labourers (NUDL), with the aim of bringing the dock workers and carters into the union. Addressing crowds of people on the steps of Belfast's Custom House, he vociferously articulated the grievances of the working classes. Due to his charismatic personality and considerable oratorial skill, Larkin succeeded in unionising the unskilled Protestant and Catholic workers.

== The lockout ==
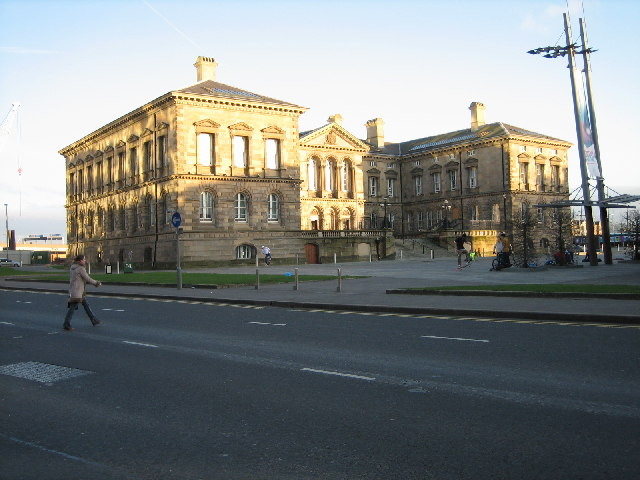
The Custom House where James Larkin gave his speeches on the steps; the steps were known as the "Speaker's Corner"

By April 1907, Larkin had recruited 2,000 workers into the NUDL union; in May the number had reached 4,500. The massive wave of labour strikes which would bring chaos to Belfast throughout the summer commenced on 26 April at Samuel Davidson's Sirocco Engineering Works in East Belfast with a walk-out by non-union workers demanding higher wages. The union members amongst Sirocco's employees were promptly sacked and the rest of the workers were each obliged to sign a document pledging not to join a trade union. The next strike occurred on Queen's Quay by employees of the coal merchant Samuel Kelly. This was after he had dismissed union members from his workforce and Larkin called for the rest of the coal workers to go on strike. On 6 May, dockers working on the SS Optic owned by Belfast Steamship Company also went out on strike after refusing to work alongside non-union members.

Most of the dockers in Belfast were employees of magnate Thomas Gallaher who owned Gallaher's Tobacco Factory and served as chairman of Belfast Steamship Company. Gallaher and Kelly were forewarned about the strike, and had sent to Dublin for 50 blackleg dockers and coal heavers to fill the strikers' places. Feeling that a strike was premature at this point in time, Larkin sent the dockers and coal heavers back to work. Upon their return, however, the men discovered that they were locked out with the imported blacklegs working in their stead. The locked-out NUDL dockers and coal heavers proceeded to force the blacklegs away from the Belfast Steamship Company's sheds and the coal merchant's quay.

Although Kelly gave in and recognised his workers' rights to union membership, when Gallaher sacked seven women for attending a meeting held by Larkin, one thousand female employees of his tobacco factory walked out of their workplace in a display of solidarity on 16 May. They marched to a strike meeting held that afternoon in Corporation Square. The women, however, were compelled to return to work the following day. Although Larkin had called on them to join a trade union, neither the NUDL nor any other trade union could admit such a high number of new members at one time. Additionally, no financial assistance was available to the women, many of whom had families to support. Thomas Gallaher refused to recognise the NUDL and had hundreds of blackleg dockers working on Donegall Quay under the protection of the RIC and troops deployed by Belfast's Lord Mayor Anthony Ashley-Cooper, 9th Earl of Shaftesbury. Larkin denounced Gallaher in speeches as an "obscene scoundrel". Gallaher for his part lamented that "the whole business is, I think, due to the uprising of socialism".

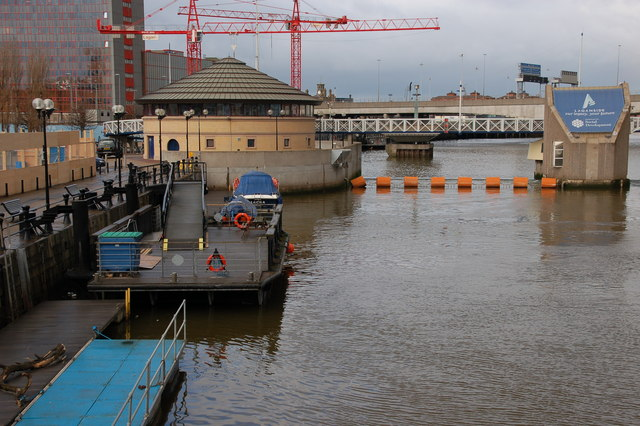
Donegall Quay as it appeared 100 years after the strike

In mid-June 500 coal heavers from other firms went out, demanding higher wages. As the end of June approached, more than 3000 dockers were on strike, including 300 from the cross-channel companies, most of which were owned by powerful British railway magnates. As unrest among Belfast's workers grew, the strike soon spread from the docks and quays to the rest of Belfast with shipyard workers, firemen, sailors, iron moulders, and transport workers joining the dockers. Between 5,000 and 10,000 people turned out to attend the strike meetings that were held daily outside the Custom House. The NUDL demanded an increase in wages along with union recognition and better working conditions, all of which Gallaher and the other shipping bosses adamantly refused to grant. At this stage, however, the dockers' strike was hampered by the strong police and military presence on the quays. On 1 July, Larkin decided to lead the striking dockers in a march to Belfast City Hall to put their case before the council chamber who were in session. According to a newspaper report, the dockers were "marshalled in a long column of fours, and headed by Mr. Larkin they marched in military order through the streets gathering an immense crowd at their heels". The politicians inside City Hall had to perforce admit a delegation of dockers to their meeting, but they would not make any concessions.

The tide suddenly turned in the dockers' favour when carters on the railway company quays refused to transport goods unloaded from the ships by the Dublin blackleg dockers. On 4 July after submitting a general pay claim, Larkin called the thousand remaining carters of Belfast, who were employed by the 60 firms of the Master Carriers Association, out on a sympathy strike. Gallaher and the other employers had no means of getting their merchandise out of the port. The Belfast Newsletter commented on the situation with the following words: "It was remarkable to see the stagnation which existed from the Custom House to the Clarendon Dock. With the exception of an isolated van or lorry driven by the obvious amateur, there was scarcely a sign of life or movement". Soon afterwards engineers and boilermakers were striking; workplaces all over the city stopped production and shut down. The strike escalated into bitter violence when shipyard workers burnt company vans, hurled rocks at the police and attacked blacklegs with "shipyard confetti" which consisted of rivets, nuts and bolts. Blackleg workers had to be billeted aboard a ship in the Belfast Lough for their own safety.

=== Solidarity between Protestants and Catholics ===
Dublin rally in support of the Belfast strikers addressed by James Larkin, Lindsay Crawford and William Walker

The strike was characterised by unrest in working class areas of Belfast and solidarity across the sectarian divide. Given that Protestants made up the majority of Belfast's workforce, most of the strikers and local strike leaders were in fact, Protestants, although Catholics comprised a significant number. Specifically, three-quarters of Belfast's carters and three-fifths of its dockers were Protestants.

That July Belfast experienced the most unusual Twelfth ever witnessed before or since. Instead of the traditional rioting and sectarian clashes which typically accompanied the Orange Order parades, the strike leaders gave public speeches defending the workers' interests against all forms of sectarianism.

On the Shankill Road, a Protestant area of the city and a regular scene of sectarian clashes, on 26 July 100,000 workers marched in support of the strike in a parade that featured flute bands from both Unionist and Nationalist traditions, a very rare occurrence. The parade ended at a mass rally held outside City Hall, where 200,000 demonstrators had gathered.

Although it involved members of both the Protestant and Catholic communities, the Irish Unionist Alliance establishment opposed the strike and subjected Larkin to a sectarian campaign of condemnation, aimed largely at coaxing Protestant workers away from the strike. Larkin did however secure the support of the Independent Orange Order, an offshoot of the mainstream Orange Order which at the time had close ties to the Protestant labour movement. Larkin was joined in public meetings by the Independents' Grand Master, R. Lindsay Crawford. Crawford encouraged workers to stand firm for the sake not only of organised labour, but also of "the unity of all Irishmen".

=== Police mutiny ===
The Royal Irish Constabulary escorting a convoy of traction engines driven by blackleg carters along Royal Avenue in central Belfast

The police mutiny broke out when the RIC were ordered to play a more participative role during their routine escort of traction engines driven by blackleg carters through the city. Blackleg carters had been recruited to drive the traction engines that had been sent to Belfast to deliver the goods which had been unable to leave the port due to the striking carters. The traction engines, equipped with makeshift armour, were almost always blocked en route by flying pickets. The RIC were enlisted to provide an escort for the blackleg carters, who constantly came under attack. In one incident in East Belfast, a crowd of shipyard workers threw a telegraph pole at a blackleg carter and his traction engine. The merchandise he had been transporting ended up in the nearby Connswater River.

The policemen, however, received no extra pay for the hazardous duty which left them vulnerable to attack nor for the regular breaking up of strikers' pickets; both of which threatened to alienate them from their own communities, and in some cases their own families.

On 19 July, RIC Constable William Barrett refused to sit beside the blackleg driver of a traction engine who had been promised personal police protection by his employer. After flatly refusing to obey District Inspector Thomas Keaveney when the latter ordered him to accompany the driver, he was promptly suspended. In response, 300 angry policemen attended a meeting at Musgrave Street Barracks and declared their support for the strike. A brawl instantly broke out inside the barracks when Barrett resisted attempts by RIC officers to arrest him. This led to another 800 policemen (about 70 per cent of the police force) joining the mutiny. They refused to offer any protection to the blacklegs, made no further attempts to disperse the strikers' pickets and Larkin persuaded them to carry out their own strike for higher wages and better pensions. In 1907, policemen's pay in Belfast ranged from £66, 16 shillings to £78 per annum. This was a wage just marginally above that earned by the best-paid dockers and carters. At the request of the Lord Mayor, extra British Army troops and cavalry were immediately deployed to Belfast to restore order, taking command of strategic areas such as the Docks and city centre; on 1 August nine warships sailed into Belfast Lough and martial law was quickly imposed in the city. On 2 August, four days before the police were due to go on strike, the leaders of the mutiny along with 200 dissident policemen were transferred from Belfast. Barrett and six other constables were dismissed from the RIC. The day after Barrett's dismissal, the strikers carried him from one police barracks to another; a mass demonstration followed where he addressed a crowd of 5,000 people, mainly striking workers. The police mutiny, however, was effectively crushed without their threatened strike having taken place.

=== End of the strike ===
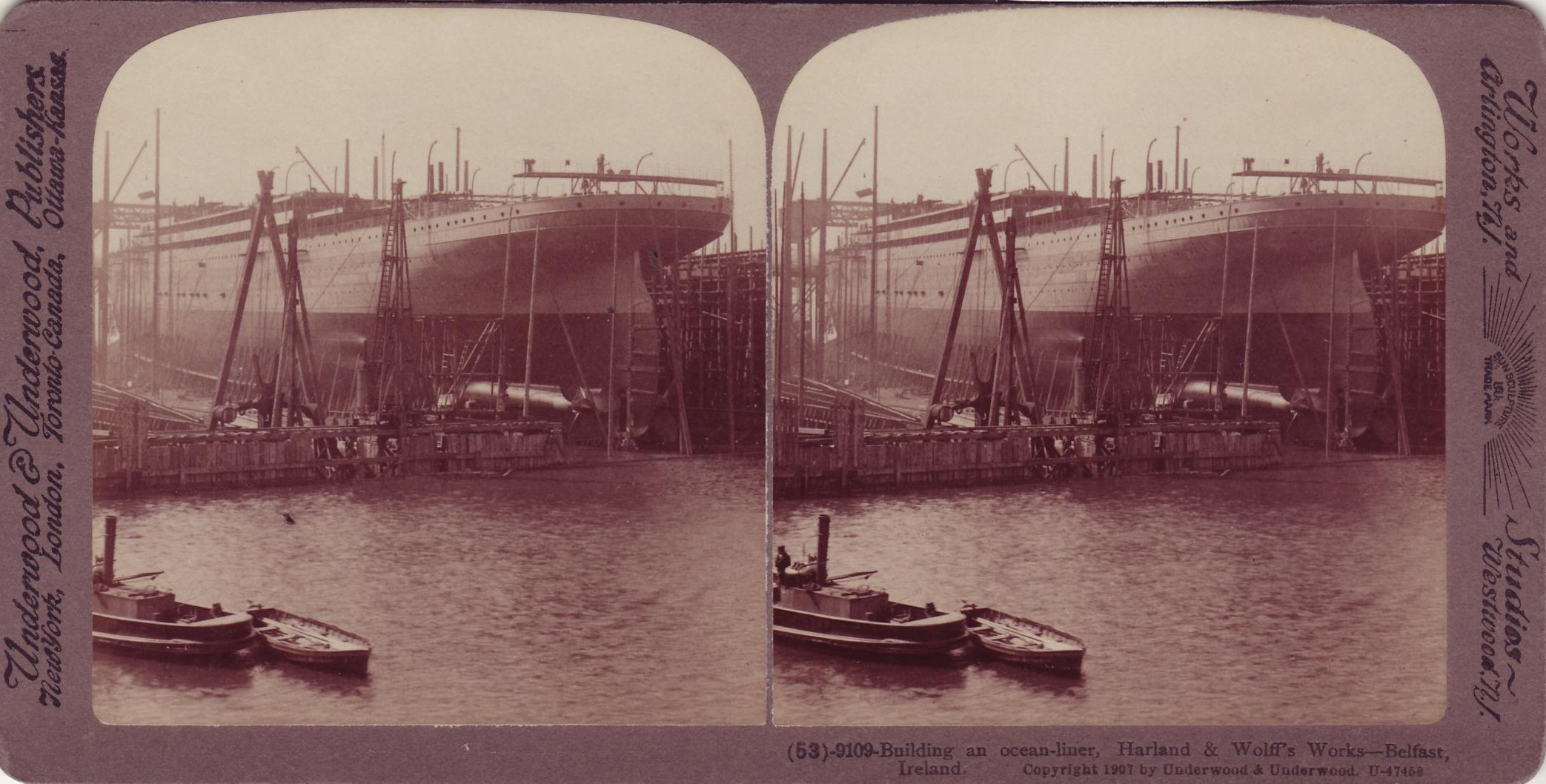
The Harland and Wolff shipyard in 1907. It was described as the "power base of Belfast's industrial might"

The Dock strike was ultimately ended on 28 August not by Larkin but by James Sexton, the overall head of the NUDL in Britain and Ireland. Sexton found the 10 shillings a week strike payments that had to be made to the dockers crippling high and, fearing that the union might be bankrupted, negotiated with the employers before agreeing to terms that amounted to capitulation by the NUDL. These separate negotiations with the other employers left the dock labourers isolated.

In the weeks leading up to the strike's termination, the Unionist press had begun to employ scare-mongering and other divisive methods to alienate the Protestant strikers from their Catholic counterparts by alluding to Irish nationalism and socialism. It also published allegations that although the Protestant strikers had largely borne the brunt of the hardships that ensued during the strike, the Catholic strikers had received larger cash payouts by the Dockers' and Carters' Strike Fund. The Irish Home Rule Movement, which had been put aside during the lockout, once again emerged as a potential threat to Irish Unionists.

In mid-August during the course of a riot in the lower Falls Road, two Catholics were killed by soldiers. This struck a serious blow to working-class unity. Despite the removal of the Army from the Falls Road area the following day, working-class solidarity was damaged beyond repair. Future Ulster Volunteer Force (UVF) gunrunner Frederick Crawford expressed the following sentiments in a letter he wrote to a friend regarding the Falls Road riot: "what a blessing all the rioting took place in the Catholic quarter of the city. This branded the whole thing a nationalist movement". The Belfast Telegraph, as well as Unionist and Nationalist politicians, quickly took the opportunity to exploit the centuries-old sectarian divisions and the two striking groups inevitably drifted back into their former sectarian camps.

== Legacy ==
The defeat of the strike saw a move towards a more Irish-based trade unionism, with the Irish Transport & General Workers Union (ITGWU) established the following year in response to the events of Belfast. This also helped to ensure a significant increase in trade union membership amongst northern Catholics, who before the strike had tended to be less unionised than their Protestant counterparts. Such a move was seen as a problem by leading figures in the Roman Catholic Church, not least the anti-socialist Cardinal Michael Logue who warned his flock that "socialism as it is preached on the Continent, and as it has commenced to be preached in these countries, is simply irreligion and atheism".

For Larkin the strike was seen as something of a triumph despite its unsatisfactory ending and it had served to establish his reputation. He would move south the following year and found that the authorities were frequently loath to confront him, given his tough reputation and the spectre of the police mutiny that had accompanied the Belfast strike. As a result, Larkin enjoyed a high success rate in labour disputes until the Dublin Lock-out of 1913. The Sligo Dock strike of 1913 was one example of these successes.

The industrial action attracted much attention, including that of John Maclean, a Scottish Marxist who came to prominence as a leader of the Red Clydeside group. Maclean was in Belfast from 1 to 3 August along with Victor Grayson and he spoke before large crowds of striking workers. Maclean was impressed by what he saw in Belfast, feeling that the strike would represent the moment in which sectarian divisions were put aside in favour of working class unity in Ireland. Furthermore, his brief time in Belfast reinvigorated his enthusiasm for the trade union movement. From his base in Glasgow Maclean had become disillusioned with trade unionism as the Glasgow dockers' unions were small and made up only of highly skilled workers who adopted the superior attitude of a "labour aristocracy". However the Belfast unions had a mass membership and for Maclean this pointed the way forward for unions as instruments of real social change and as such he took up his pen in support of the Belfast strike. Maclean would later become an enthusiastic supporter of Irish nationalism, and in declaring his support for the First Dáil he suggested that it was the culmination of a new struggle that had begun with the 1907 Dock strike.

Former Irish Labour Party leader Ruairi Quinn described the Belfast Dock strike as having been a "major event in the early years of the trade union movement". In Belfast and Dublin, statues of James Larkin were erected in his honour. To commemorate the 100th anniversary of the event, a stained glass window depicting the dock strike was unveiled at Belfast City Hall by the Lord Mayor, Pat McCarthy.

== In film ==
The Belfast Dock strike featured in the 2012 television series Titanic: Blood and Steel; however, it contained many glaring historical inaccuracies.
