= Sirocco Works =

Northern Irish engineering firm (1881–1999)

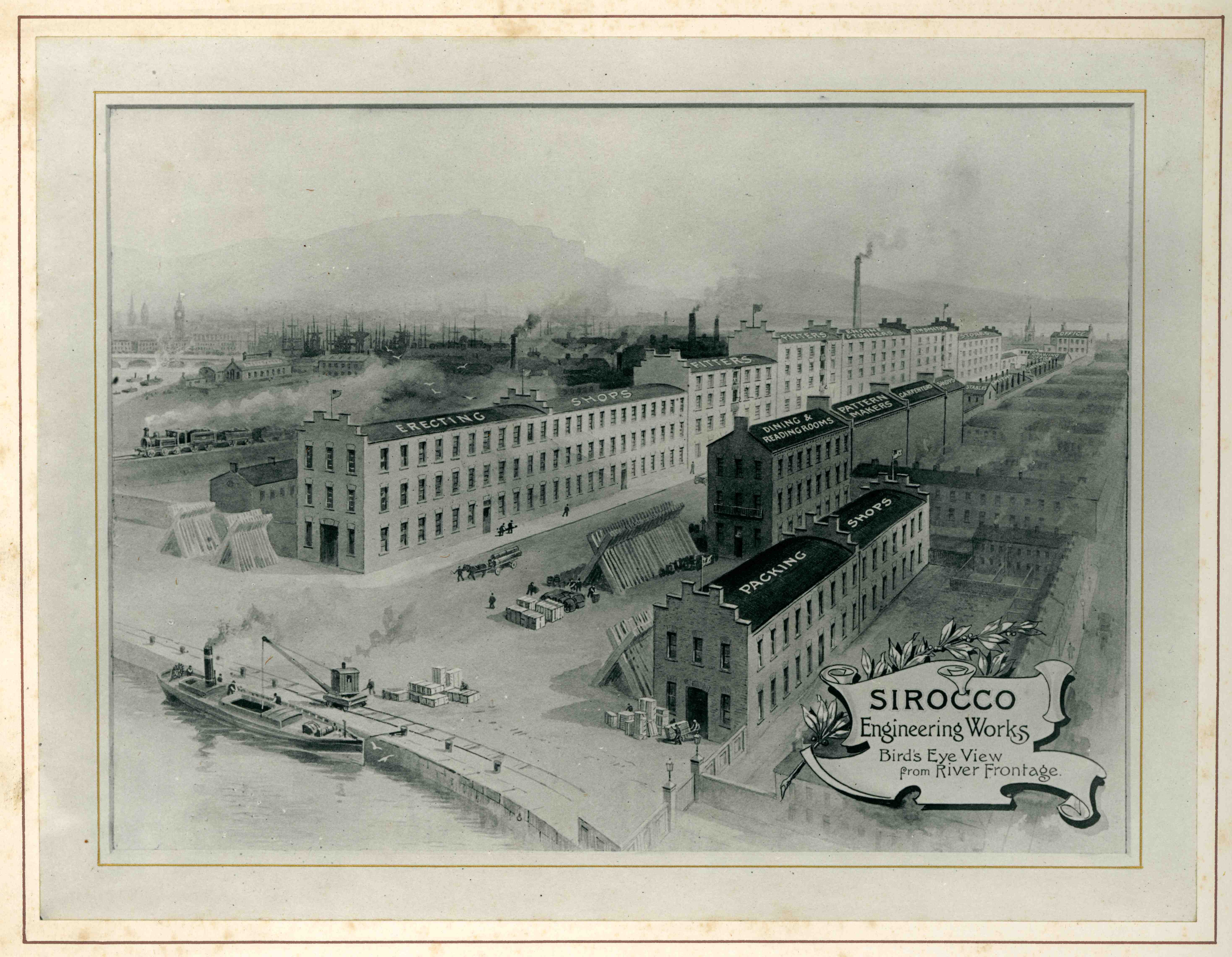
Hand painted illustration of Sirocco Works, aerial view

Sirocco Works, officially Sirocco Engineering Works, was an engineering firm based in Belfast, Northern Ireland. The site is located beside Short Strand, adjacent to Bridge End and River Lagan. It was founded by Samuel Cleland Davidson in 1881 under Davidson and Co, which Sirocco was also known as.

Belfast Sirocco Works initially produced tea processing machinery. They once produced three-quarters of the world's tea processing, and lead worldwide in ventilation equipment. Sirocco Works played a significant part of Belfast's industrial revolution at the turn of the 20th century.

Sirocco Works' engineering products were used in a range of industries, including shipbuilding, manufacturing and mining. Davidson's invention, the centrifugal fan, among other parts, were installed in numerous ships, including the RMS Titanic. Their technology played a crucial role in industrial development across the globe. Sirocco became one of the leading industries for rope production, referred to as Sirocco Ropeworks.

In 1988, Sirocco Works was purchased by James Howden and Co and its name changed to Howden Sirocco as a part of Howden Group up until its closure in 1999.

== History ==
Davidson had inherited his fathers wealth following his death, and after working on a family tea plantation and becoming manager of Cacher Estate in Calcutta, India, he returned to Belfast to establish Sirocco Works in 1881. In the beginning, he would employ only seven workers, but at its height, the factory would have 1,500 workers employed. The name 'Sirocco' is derived from hot wind that blows across the North African desert.

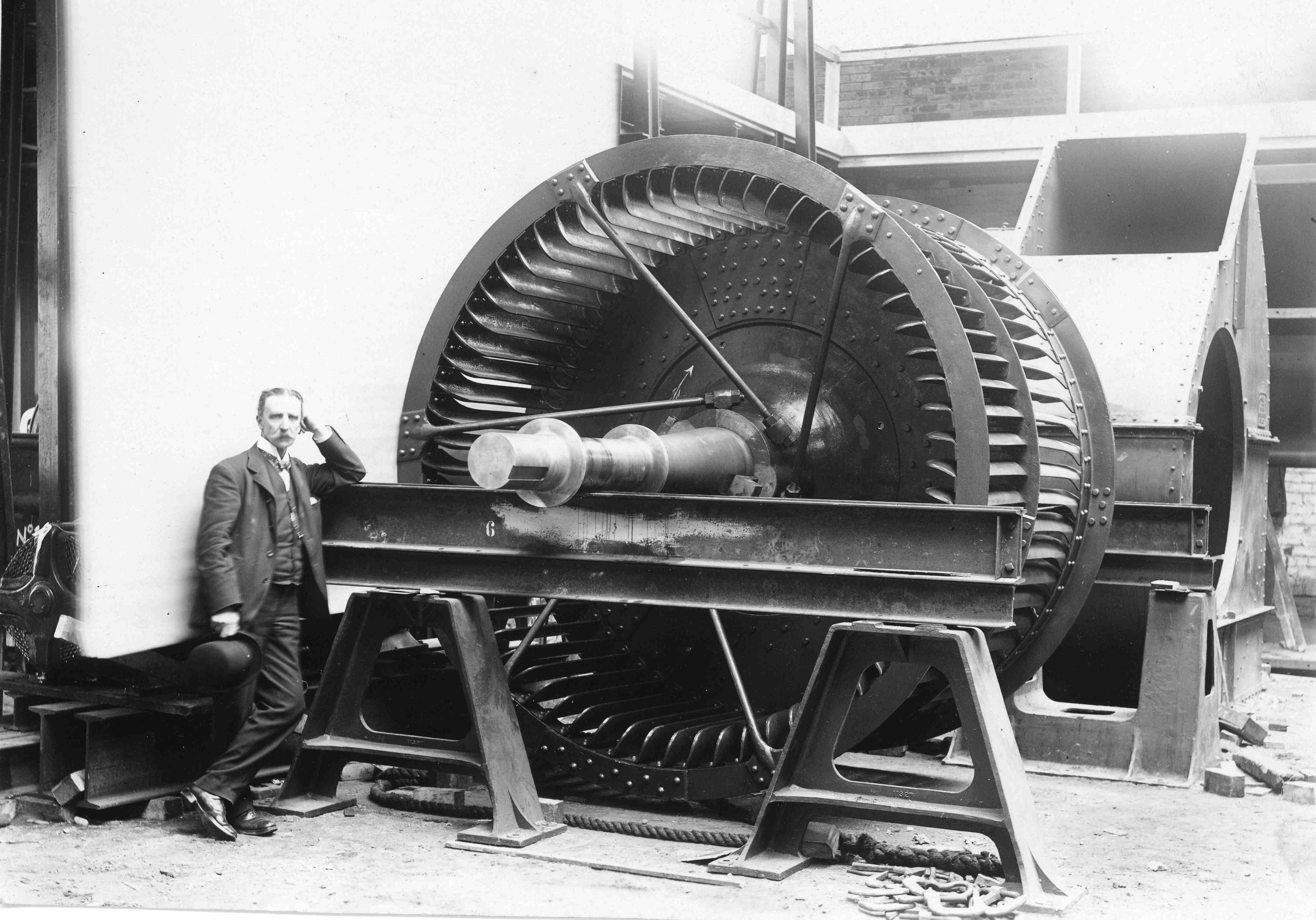
Samuel Davidson with a centrifugal fan in Sirocco Works factory

Sirocco Works developed centrifugal fans initially for tea drying. The hot air would be used as a quick, sufficient method for air flow, where hot air would be forced through many trays of tea leaves. The machinery's processing speed and quality of tea leaves impressed investors, making it a success.

In 1902, the Sirocco Works produced mechanical ventilation, passing the air through wet screens to free venues from dust, soot and microbes. They installed their ventilation in Royal Belfast Academical Institution and Ulster Hall.

In 1904, following its early success, the site expanded to 40 acres. Harland & Wolff Shipyard had made a deal to use Davidson and Co for the use of their Sirocco Fans on the RMS titanic during its construction in 1909 and 1912. The partnership improved between H&W and Sirocco Works involving the fitting of ships up until the 1960s.

In 1922, Sirocco Works built heat exchangers, which helped develop terrace housing in Belfast east.

The 1907 Belfast Dock Strike affected multiple trades in Belfast, from dockers, such as Sir Samuel Kelly's John Kelly Limited, to Sirocco Works employees, including its engineers and welders. It stemmed from James Larkin, who revived the close to dissolving National Union of Dock Labourers. He organized laborer's into the union and called for a strike following the employer's refusal to meet the wage demands of the workers. A failed strike caused by unorganized by Sirocco Works' employees escalated into widespread working class militancy.

In 1909, the Sirocco Works' fan was used in a training test by the Institution of Mechanical Engineers.

In the 1910s and 1920s, Sirocco Works began advertising and installing their Sirocco Fans in England and Wales. It was used in various venues, such as theatres and office blocks, as well as factories. Advertisements referred to how they "ensure an invigorating atmosphere that is free from impurities and smoke", as well as maintaining the right temperature.

In July 1920, Catholic and Protestant tensions were high, following the murder of an RUC police officer in Banbridge by the Irish Republican Army. Notices appeared in Belfast shipyards and other trades calling on the predominately Protestant workforce to drive out 'disloyal' workers. Following further civil unrest, Catholics were expelled from Sirocco Works. The Protestant workers entered the Sirocco works and used brute-force to throw the Catholics out of the premises.

In 1988, Howden Group purchased Davidson and Co's Sirocco Works. It was renamed to Howden Sirocco.

In 1991, Sirocco Works reported a slump in half-year profits. IT was git by contractual issues on a tunneling project in the Great Belt, Denmark, other issues included loss of business on sanctions placed on Iraq, as well as being hit with the economic recession during this period.

Sirocco continued to struggle in the 1990s as industrial production continued to disappear in the UK and Ireland, and move to other countries for inexpensive costs and labor.

=== Closure and new ownership ===
In 1999, Sirocco Works ceased operations, it was sold for redevelopment. Production moved overseas. The property was demolished in 2009.

Sirocco Works was acquired by Howden group and the factory opened on Queen's Island, Queen's Road, Belfast east.

In 2015, Howden closed down, seeing around 100 jobs lost. They moved production to Glasgow, Scotland. This seen the last connection to Sirocco Works in Belfast come to an end after an over 150-year history. Alliance Party deputy leader Naomi Long said “This is concerning news, especially following similar closures in the East Belfast area lately".

== Sirocco site redevelopment ==
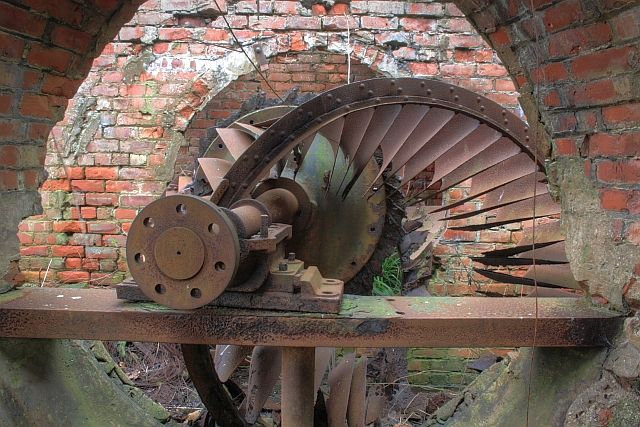
Remains of a Sirocco Fan in the derelict site

In 2000, Ewart Properties had purchased the site from Howden Sirocco for £23m. Ewarts proposed to develop 129,000ft2 of office space, 98no. apartments, a 90,000ft2 retail store and 50,000ft2 of additional retail space.

In 2006, following minimal progress, Ewart Properties sold the Sirocco Works site for £40m to Carvill Group. The new ownership tasked Llewelyn Davies Yeang, for a new proposal to be sent to DoE Planning. In March 2008, the proposal comprised 2,400 apartments (175,600m2), 4 star hotel (5,000m2), supermarket, and additional retail space (15,500m2), commercial space (10,600m2), leisure facilities (430m2), care home (2,000m2), GP surgery and 1,770 basement parking lot. Reworks from various architects had taken place, which none of them were actioned.

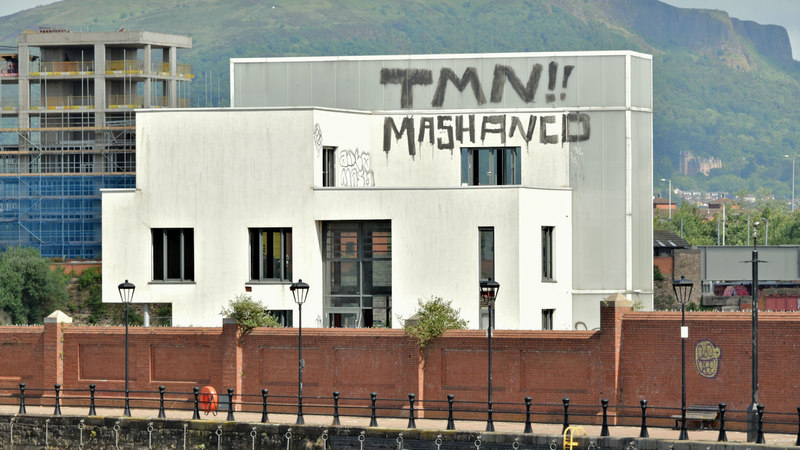
Carvill Group marketing suite, vandalized, one year before it was demolished

In 2009, Carvill Group had developed a three-story marketing suite to contain temporary show apartments for perspective purchasers of the new proposal. The building was never fully finished, and was demolished ten years later in July 2019.

In August 2016, Swinford (Sirocco) Ltd (owned by Gulf Resources Development & Investment, Corbally Group and Graftongate) acquired the Sirocco site. Swinford (Sirocco) Ltd (Osborne and Co.) was set up by St Francis Group as an affiliate company for the project.

The affiliate group Swinford (Sirocco) Ltd is also known as Osborne and Co. A £450 million proposal to regenerate the former Sirocco Works site was created by Osborne and Co. They secured planning permission July 2020 following the greenlight from Belfast City Council in 2019. It is known as The Waterside project.

The proposal includes 800,000 sq ft of office space, a 70,000 sq ft hotel, 60,000 sq ft of retail space and 800 homes. It is named The Waterside Project. As on 2025, no developments on the site have been delivered. The 16-acre site of Sirocco Works remains derelict and has rampant vegetation and neglected foliage.

== Legacy ==
In Sirocco Quays, a memorial walk along the River Lagan, known as Sirocco Walk was marked on paving stones. It spans from Bridge End to Albert Bridge

== Football team ==
Sirocco Engineering Works established a football club, Sirocco Works Football Club, established in 1924. Despite the dissolution of the company, the intermediate football club is still active playing in Northern Amateur Football League in Dixon Park.
