= Bangor New Cemetery =

Coordinates: 54°39′02″N 5°40′39″W

Bangor New Cemetery in a cemetery in Whitehill, Bangor, County Down, Northern Ireland. It is on the Newtownards Road. It is a closed cemetery, apart from burials in existing graves. It is managed under the Ards and North Down Borough Council. Bangor New Cemetery opened in 1899.

== Notable interments ==
The cemetery is the resting place for 40 servicemen who served in WWII and victims of the Blitz.

- Sir Samuel Kelly (1879-1937) - businessperson, coal merchant, philanthropist, established John Kelly Limited
- Elizabeth McCracken (1871-1944) - suffragist, feminist writer
- Nesca Robb (1905-1976) - writer
