= John Kelly (coal merchant) =

Irish businessman, philanthropist and coal merchant (1840 - 1904)

An interpretation of the company's business premises at the Ulster Folk Museum, John Kelly Limited, the formal name of the company named after his son, Sir Samuel Kelly.

John Kelly (1840–1904) was an Irish businessperson, philanthropist, shipowner and coal merchant from Belfast, Ireland. He is known for being the owner of John Kelly Coal Company, located on Queen's Quay, Belfast. His son, Sir Samuel Kelly made John Kelly Coal Company a limited company, as John Kelly Limited, thus sticking with John Kelly as the business name. John Kelly is the son of Samuel Kelly, and took over his coal company following his death in 1877.

== Life and career ==
John Kelly was born in 1840, and was raised in Belfast, by his father, Samuel Kelly, and his mother, Susannah Kelly.

Kelly was 37 years of age when his father died in 1877, and he was destined to expand the coal business and fleet, with many steam coasters. Contacts for shipbuilders would commence, such as W. M. Barkley, built by the Scottish shipbuilding company Ailsa Shipping of Troon. He was noted for his philanthropy.

John Kelly died on 15 September 1904, aged 63. John's son, Sir Samuel Kelly, would take over the business. Sir Samuel would take the company to new heights, and incorporated as a limited company under John Kelly Limited in 1911, keeping his father's name under the company name.
