= Nesca Robb =

Irish writer

- Born: 27 May 1905; Belfast, Ireland
- Died: 18 May 1976 (aged 70); Oxford, England
- Resting place: Bangor, County Down

Nesca Robb (27 May 1905 – 18 May 1976) was an Irish writer.

== Life ==
Nesca Adeline Robb was born in Belfast on 27 May 1905. She was the daughter of the managing director of J. Robb & Co., Charles Robb and his wife Agnes (née Arnold). Robb attended Richmond Lodge, and then to Somerville College, Oxford to study modern languages in 1924. She received a BA in 1927, an MA in 1931 and then a D.Phil. in 1932. She published her research as Neoplatonism of the Italian renaissance in 1935. Robb was a member of the Northern Ireland committee of the National Trust, to which she presented the family home, Lisnabreeny House, Castlereagh, in 1937. She engaged in social and voluntary work for a time, before moving to London in 1938 to take up a position at the London Institute of Italian Studies.

She published her first volume with Blackwell in 1939 as Poems. She was the registrar and advisory officer to the Women's Employment Federation between 1940 and 1944, during which time she wrote a partial account of life An Ulsterwoman in England in 1942. She returned to Northern Ireland in 1944, working for a number of public bodies including PEN and the National Trust, and writing. Robb served as a member of the Committee for the Encouragement of Music and the Arts in 1951. In the same year her edited The arts in Ulster with John Hewitt and Sam Hanna Bell, which argued that any mention of politics should be excluded from collections.

In 1962 and 1966 she produced a large two-volume history of William of Orange. In 1963 Robb became a member of the Maatschappij der Nederlandse Letterkunde. She produced a final volume of poetry in 1970, Ards eclogues, and was elected a Fellow of the Royal Society of Literature. Over her life time she wrote 7 volumes of poetry, history and art criticism. Robb died on 18 May 1976 in Oxford, and is buried at Bangor New Cemetery, County Down.

A documentary about Robb, A Woman Called Nesca, was aired on BBC 2 Northern Ireland in June 2016.
