= Sir Samuel Kelly =

Irish coal merchant and shipowner

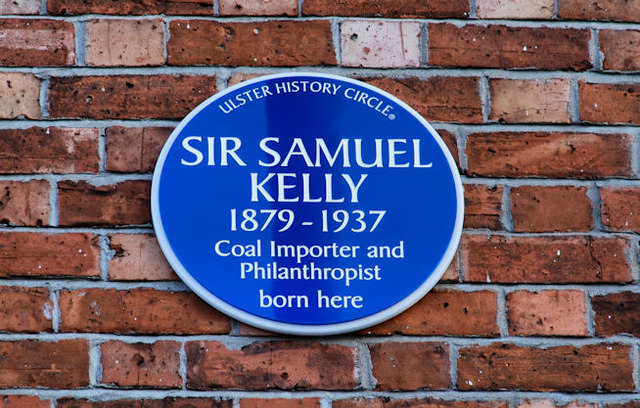
Sir Samuel Kelly commemorative plaque on Castlereagh Street, where he was born

Sir Samuel Kelly (1879–1937) was an Irish coal merchant, philanthropist and businessperson from Belfast, Ireland. He is the son of John Kelly, and grandson of Samuel Kelly. He is known for establishing John Kelly Coal Company as a limited company in 1911 as John Kelly Limited.

== Life and career ==
Samuel Kelly was born in 1879, on 94 Castlereagh Road, Belfast east.

In 1904, he took over John Kelly Coal Company at Queen's Quay, Belfast, after his father, John Kelly, died.

In 1911, Sir Samuel Kelly established the company as a limited company, as John Kelly Limited, with a capital of £50,000. Weeks later, he took over rival Wm. Barkley & Sons Limited. This was the beginning of a process of growth and expansion which resulted in the company being one of the biggest coal companies in the United Kingdom. One steam coaster, the W.M. Barkley, was sold in 1912 to Guinness in Dublin. It was sunk in October 1917 by a German U-boat.

During World War I, several of Kelly's fleet were requisitioned by the British Government. The majority would play a key role in supplying coal to Belfast.

Kelly was deputy lieutenant of County Tyrone, vice-president of the Belfast Chamber of Commerce and an active member of the Belfast Harbour Commissioners. He was chair of the Ulster Fireclay Company, the Tyrone Brickworks and the Coalisland Weaving Company. He took ownership the Cumberland Mine Company and the St Helen’s Colliery.

Kelly was knighted in 1922. He was described as a 'leading merchant, a public benefactor, a consistent and generous supporter of charitable objects'.

In 1929, to access further coal supply, Kelly acquired a coal mine at Workington. He then turned his attention to an Irish coalfield, opening a colliery at Annagher, County Tyrone. At various times he held around fifteen directorships, including of the Ulster Bank and Workington Electric Power Co.

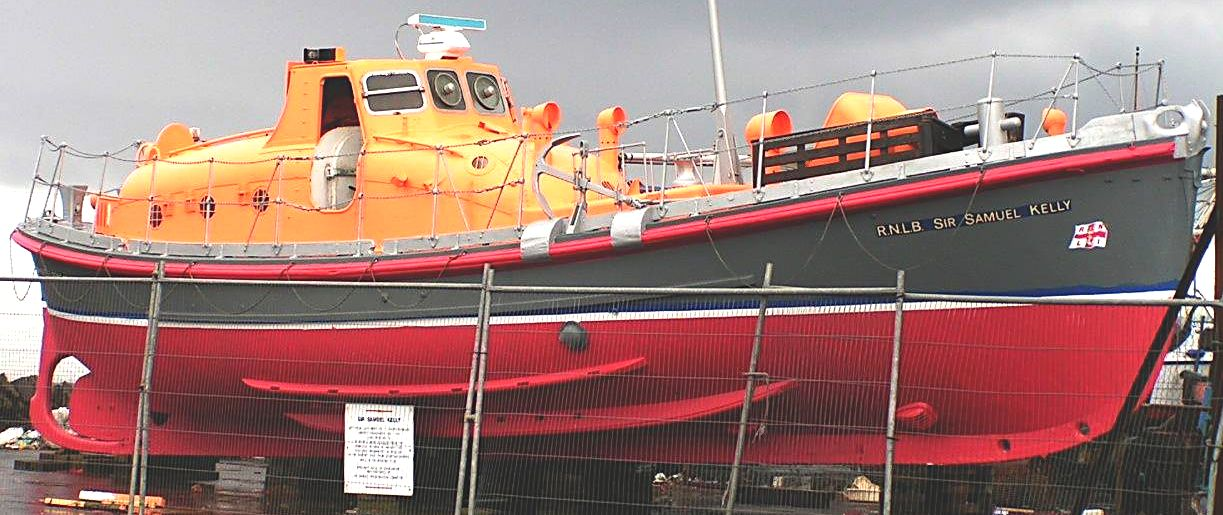
Sir Samuel Kelly lifeboat, 2008

On 9 February 1937, Kelly died from a long-standing heart condition. He is buried at Bangor New Cemetery, Bangor.

His wife, Lady Kelly, donated to many causes. She bequeathed the cost of a new lifeboat for Donaghadee to the Royal National Lifeboat Institution (RNLI) in 1950.

== Legacy ==
Sir Samuel Kelly Memorial Nursing Home in Holywood, County Down was gifted by the Kelly family to The Salvation Army.

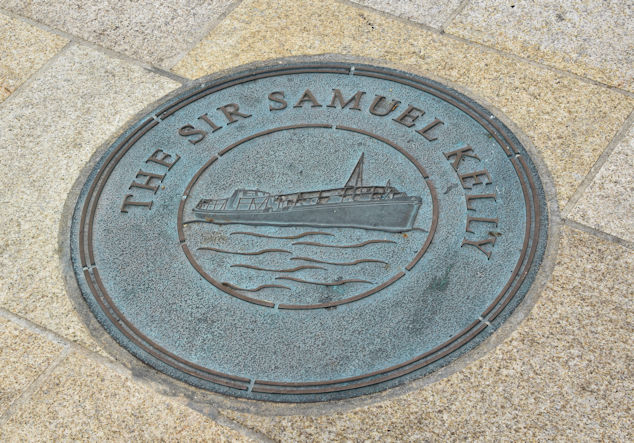
Sir Samuel Kelly ground plaque, Donaghadee, 2016

In 1950, a lifeboat was named after Kelly, and operated for 29 years under the RNLI's fleet. The lifeboat was a part of the Ulster Folk and Transport Museum. It was in a state of disrepair, and after being contacted by former and then-current lifeboat crew from Donaghadee to restore it, which they would agree to. It was brought back to Donaghadee Marina Car Park and is now a tourist attraction. In 2016, the Donaghadee Heritage Preservation Company was formed, and in 2024, funds were used to grow their expedition and continue to restore the interior of the Sir Samuel Kelly lifeboat. The DHPC set up a souvenir shop with Sir Samuel Kelly merchandise.

In April 2009, a commemorative plaque was erected by the Ulster History Circle on the Castlereagh Road on the house where Kelly was born.
