= Tom Gallaher =

British businessman (1840–1928)

- Born: April 1840; Templemoyle in Derry
- Died: 3 May 1928 (aged 88)

Thomas Gallaher (April 1840 – 3 May 1928) was the founder of Gallaher Group, one of the largest cigarette manufacturers in the United Kingdom.

== Career ==
Born at Templemoyle in Derry and apprenticed to the general merchanting firm of Osborne & Allen at the age of 14, Tom Gallaher set up business for himself in 1857 in a single room where he would twist his tobacco and wrap it before delivering it to his customers.

In 1863 he moved to Belfast where he was able to access a larger market for his product. In 1896 he opened a large factory in York Street. He acquired plantations in Kentucky and Virginia to supply the tobacco for his ever expanding business now known as Gallaher Group.

He died in 1928 and is buried in Belfast City Cemetery.

== Family ==
In 1873 he married Robina Mitchell Bell and together they went on to have one son and five daughters.
