= John Kelly Limited =

Irish fuels merchant

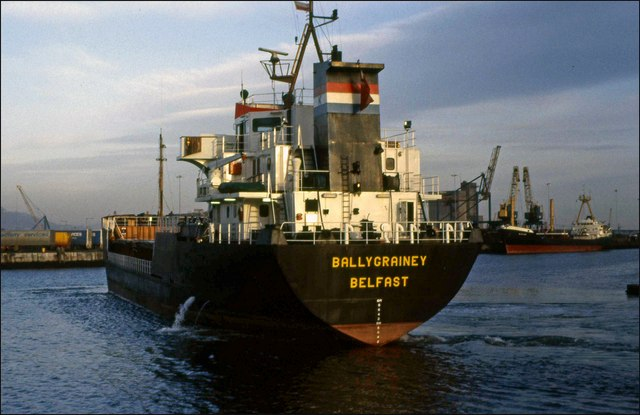
A Kelly's coal boat, 1988

John Kelly Limited, also known as Kelly's Coal Quay, Kelly's Coal, or simply Kelly's, was best known for being coal merchants and shipowner in Belfast, Northern Ireland. Dating back to the 1840s, when Samuel Kelly started a grocers and coal commissions business on Queen's Quay, Belfast. It was previously known as John Kelly Coal Company, when Samuel Kelly's son John Kelly, took over as owner following his father's death. It was established as John Kelly Limited by John Kelly's son, and grandson of Samuel Kelly, Sir Samuel Kelly, keeping the name of his father. It became a staple along the Belfast harbour, and the area, alongside Cawoods Coal, and Hugh Craig & Co. would become known locally as the "coal quay" (from Queen's Quay, where the coal merchants were situated).

The company still exists, but is no longer known as John Kelly Limited, it runs under Kelly Fuels LTD. They entered the domestic solid fuel and fuel oil business.

== History ==
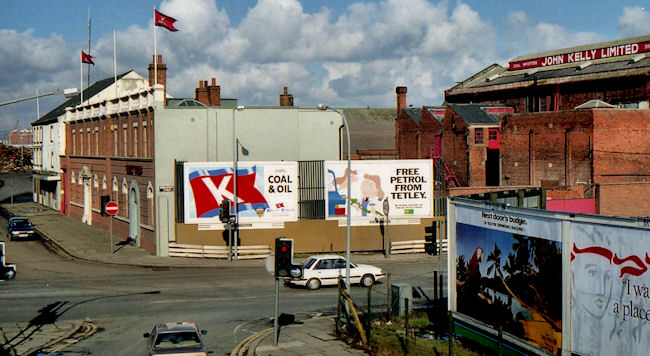
Kelly's coal & oil office and yard, Belfast 1991

Samuel Kelly, was born in 1818, and started up a business on Queen's Quay in the 1840s, as a grocer and coal commissions business. He established the coal merchant business in 1852, as Samuel Kelly Limited. Samuel would die in 1877 aged 57.

John Kelly, aged 37, took over the business and founded it as John Kelly Coal Company. His role was to take the reign and expand the fleet. By the turn of the century, Kelly's had grown to a workforce of around 10,000, and would continue to create ships to import and export coal, as well as having multiple offices and yards in many towns such as Carrickfergus.

In 1904, John Kelly died. His son, Sir Samuel Kelly took over the company

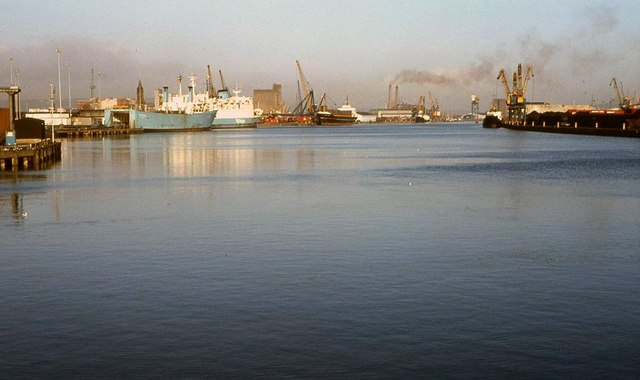
On the eastern side of the River Lagan, a Kelly's boat is discharging coal at Queen's Quay. Kelly's swan-necked cranes and coal yards can also be seen, January 1982

In 1907, the Belfast Dock strike took place from 26 April to 28 August, including Queen's Quay by Sir Samuel Kelly's employee's after men from Kelly's coal quay were sacked for trying to join National Union of Dock Labourers (NUDL). On 9 May, locked-out coalmen from Kelly's Yard attacked strikebreakers unloading coal at the docks. They would overpower the harbour police and forced the scans to retreat, throwing rivets and lumps of coal at them.

Samuel granted union recognition and wage increase from 6d (2.5p) to 5 shillings' (25p) a week. When the workers attempted to return to work, they found that the employers' Shipping Federation had replaced them with workers from Dublin.

In 1911, the firm became "John Kelly Limited" with a capital of £50,000. In 1922, he was knighted. He was described as `A leading merchant, a public benefactor, a consistent and generous supporter of charitable objects’ His many donations included the building of two churches in Holywood. Sir Samuel Kelly died in 1937.

Lady Kelly would continue his philanthropic work. In 1950, she generously bequeathed the funds for a new lifeboat for the Royal National Lifeboat Institution station in Donaghadee, to be named in her husband's memory. The Sir Samuel Kelly Lifeboat has since become a tourist attraction in the town after it was retired, with an exhibit held for its history. It was refurbished by a group of volunteers under the Sir Samuel Kelly Lifeboat Project. A grant was given to their efforts by the National Lottery fund.

In the 1980s, as coal kept being phased out by United Kingdom, it became known as Kelly's Fuels Ltd. It was set up in Northern Ireland to get into the domestic solid fuel and oil business. The first road tanker was acquired in 1983. It became a well-known company for the people in County Down and Belfast, as one of the largest oil distributors in Northern Ireland.

Jazz musician George Cassidy worked for John Kelly Limited up until its closure. He was presented with memorabilia.

The weir and cross-harbour bridges project began in the 1990s, which saw the last of the coal quays situated along Queen's Quay, it was completed in 1994, and cost around £14,000,000.

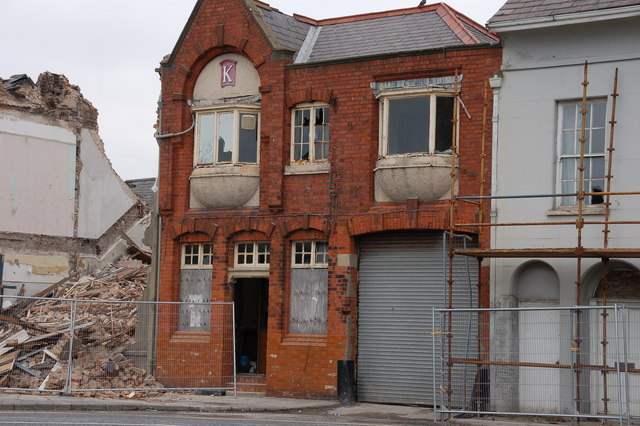
Kelly's coal office, Carrickfergus, prior to restoration, 2013

In 1993, Kelly's Fuels Ltd merged with the Lanes Group ltd. Kelly Fuels took over Bruce Lindsay Coal of Edinburgh in 1997, which gave them a presence in Scotland, primarily in Invergordon.

They now have depots in Derry, Ballymena, Portadown, Belfast and Coleraine.

In 2018, a project funded by the Heritage Lottery Fund and Mid and East Antrim borough Council had started to restore Kelly's coal offices to preserve the historic building. The coal office dates back to 1910, and was taken over by John Kelly Limited in 1920 Robinson's Shoes Outlet opened in the building in February 2020.

== Company name changes ==
- Samuel Kelly Coal Merchant
- John Kelly Coal Company
- John Kelly Limited
- Kelly's Fuels Ltd / Kelly Oils Ltd

== See also ==
- Belfast Harbour
- Belfast Lough
- Queen's Island
- History of Belfast
