= Donegall Quay =

Quay by the River Lagan, Belfast, Northern Ireland

Coordinates: 54°36′09″N 5°55′18″W

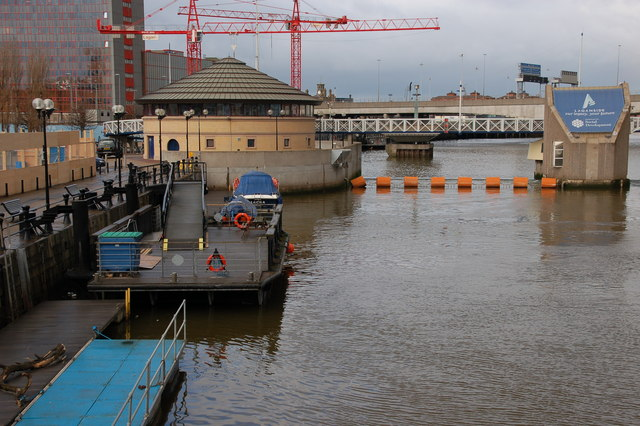
Donegall Quay before redevelopment as urban green space

Donegall Quay is a public park and greenspace located in Belfast on the River Lagan upstream of the Lagan Weir. It was originally developed in the early 1800s on reclaimed land and became integral to shipping in Belfast Harbour. It is opposite of Queen's Quay.

The Big Fish statue is located on the quay, as is the sculpture Sammy the Seal. Obel Tower is also adjacent to the quay.

== Industrial usage ==
Donegall Quay was developed in the early 1800s on reclaimed land, and became an integral area for shopping in the Belfast harbour.

In the 1980's, it was an active quayside where freight, such as scrap, would be transported and deposited. Donegall Quay was also used as a port, as ships would arrive, and depart for Liverpool and Glasgow.

== Redevelopment ==
Donegall Quay became a derelict piece of land, and would become a key part of redeveloping for the weir and cross-harbour road and railway bridges multiple-million pound project. The redevelopment included landscaping of the area, to become more tourist-friendly, and Donegall Quay Car Park was built, as well as the Laganside Bus Centre, which took the place of the old bus stations at Smithfield and Oxford Street. Railway bridges would be built in the 1990's, as well as the Lagan Weir, which bridge meets Queen's Quay from Donegall Quay.
