= Samuel Kelly (coal merchant) =

Irish businessman (1818–1877)

Samuel Kelly (1818–1877) was an Irish businessman, unionist gun-runner, shipowner and coal merchant, from Ballinderry, County Antrim, Ireland. He was the father of John Kelly, founder of John Kelly Coal Company. He is also the grandfather of Sir Samuel Kelly, founder of John Kelly Limited. Samuel started a business on Queen's Quay in 1840 as a "grocer and commission coal merchant". He is a key figure in the beginnings of what would be a thriving industry and a significant contributor to the economy of Ireland.

== Life and career ==
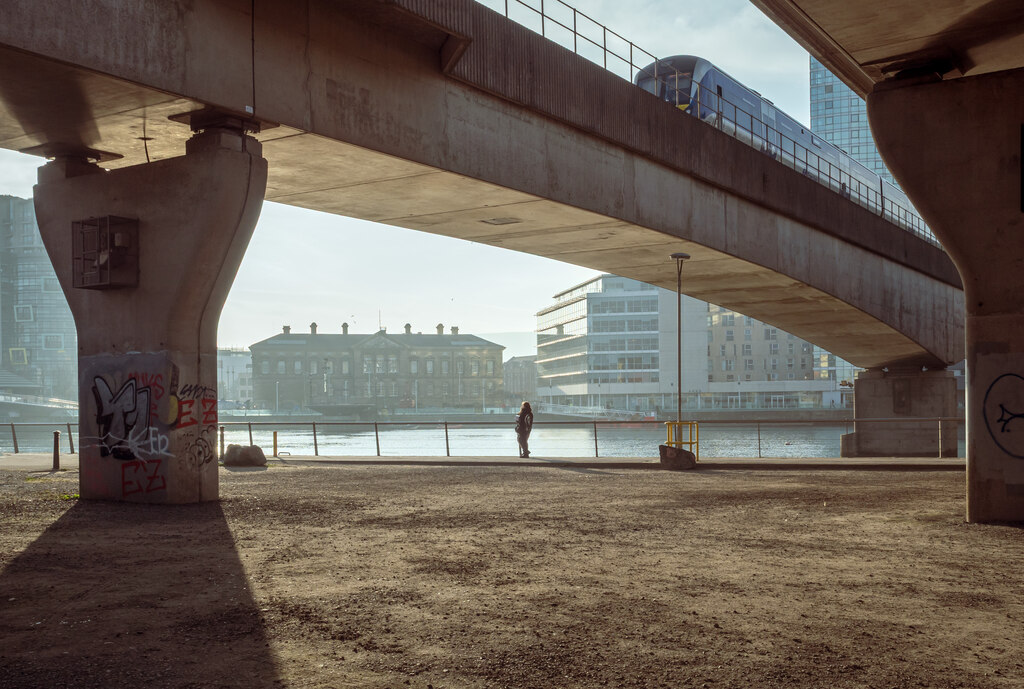
Queen's Quay, formerly the location of Samuel Kelly Coal Merchants

Samuel Kelly was born in 1818, in Ballinderry, Ireland. He was a staunch unionist, and grew up in a Methodist family.

After running his business on Queen's Quay as a grocers and commission coal merchant, Kelly established his coal merchant's business in 1852.

In 1861, Kelly moved into coal importation, operating a fleet of small sailing vessels such as brigantines and schooners. His early fleet included the William (108 grt), Melissa, Agnes C. James, Balmarino, Kelpie, Pleiades, Fellow Craft, and Doria.

He married Isabella Kelly, and they had a son, John Kelly, who would assist him in the business.

Kelly died in 1877, at the age of 57.

John Kelly, aged 37, took over the business, and founded it as John Kelly Coal Company. Following this, Sir Samuel Kelly (1879–1937), son of John Kelly, established the business in 1911 as "John Kelly Limited".
