= Queen's Quay, Belfast =

River structure in Belfast, Northern Ireland

Coordinates: 54.602°N 5.914°W

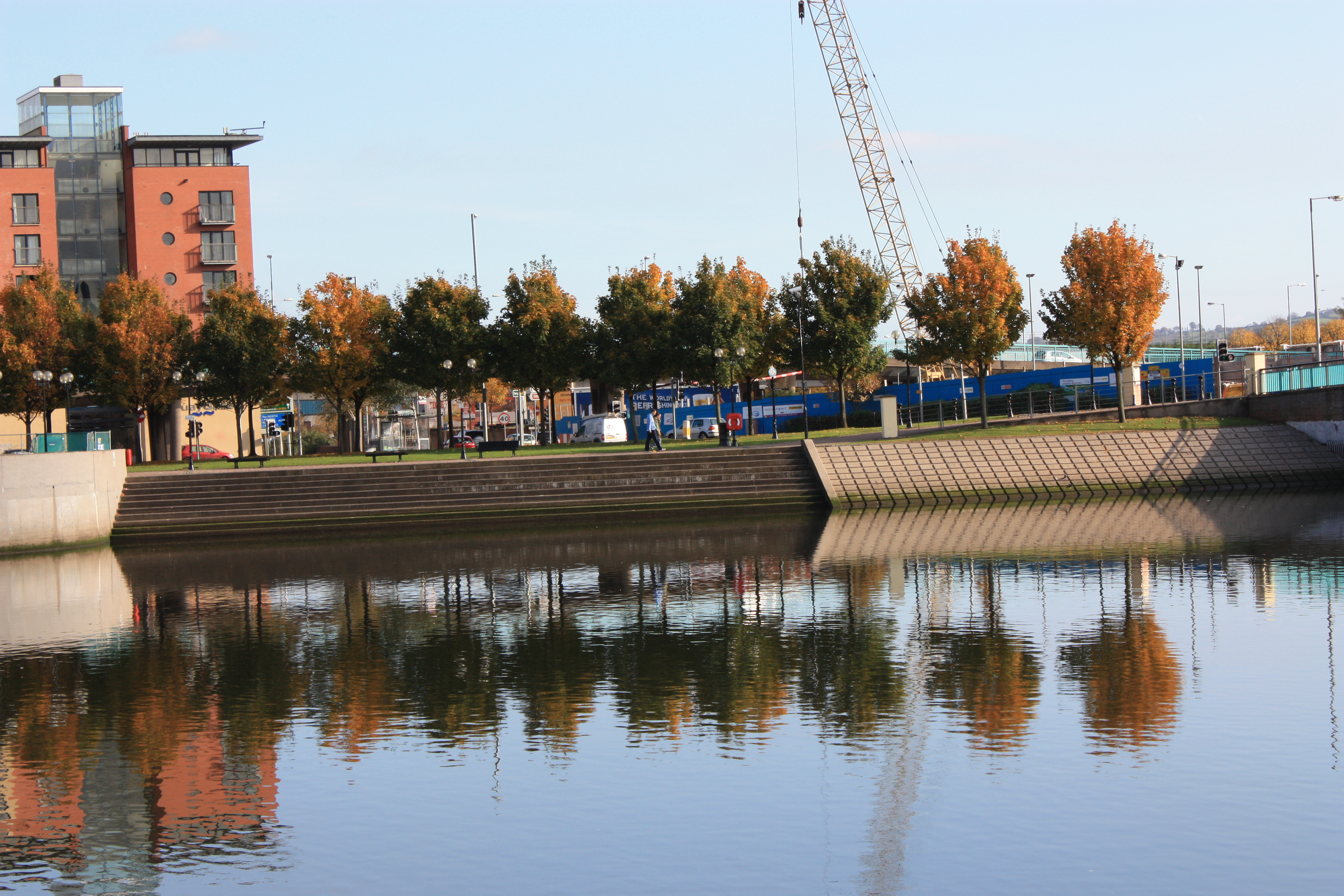
Queen's Quay, October 2009

Queen's Quay is a section of the River Lagan, in the western Titanic Quarter of the city of Belfast, Northern Ireland. The quay became known as the Coal Quay during its industrial period, with industrial businesses running along the quay, including scrap and coal transporting and exporting to and from freight and coal boats. Queen's Quay is named after Queen Victoria following her 1849 royal visit.

As its name suggests, it originally located the southern section of the Belfast docks complex. But, as ships grew, it became a major transportation hub for both the capital and Northern Ireland.

== Belfast & County Down Railway (B&CDR), Queen's Quay station ==
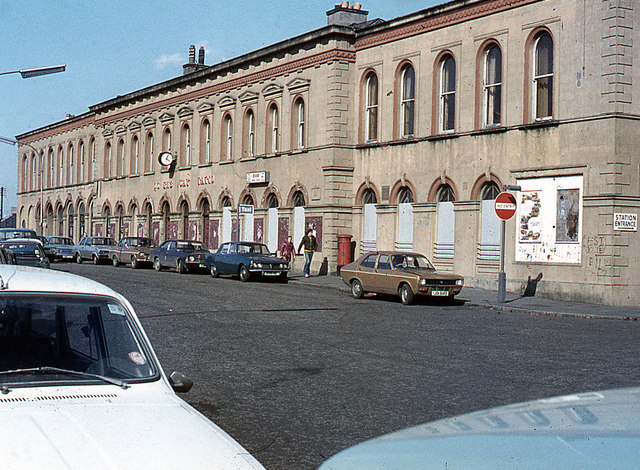
Passenger terminal of Queen's Quay railway station, (rebuilt 1910–14) in July 1974.

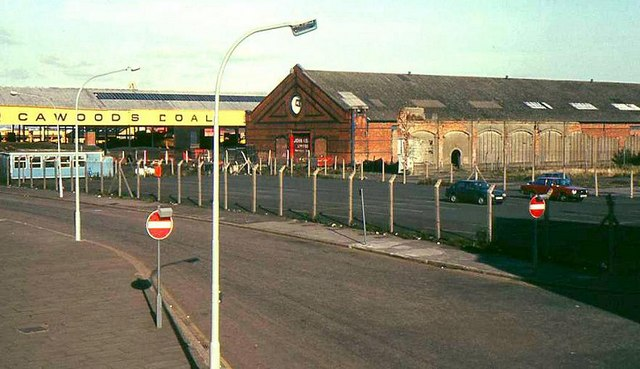
The site of the station in October 1988, before construction began on the cross-harbour M3 and rail bridges.

Originally it was located in the southern section of the Belfast docks complex, but as ships grew it became the Belfast terminus of the Belfast and County Down Railway, linking Belfast south-eastwards via 80 miles of track into County Down. The first train from the station ran on 2 August 1848 to Holywood, with services eventually extending as far as Castlewellan, Downpatrick, Newcastle and the fishing village of Ardglass.

Queen's Quay also housed the B&CDR's locomotive maintenance workshops, and from 1886 the carriage works. The last carriage was built in 1923. All lines except to Bangor closed in 1950 shortly after nationalisation into the Ulster Transport Authority. The station was closed and demolished in 1976, and Bangor services were diverted to the new Belfast Central Station via the reopened Belfast Central line.

Preceding station	Historical railways	Following station
Terminus	Belfast and County Down Railway; Belfast-Downpatrick-Newcastle	Fraser Street Halt
Terminus	Belfast and County Down Railway; Belfast-Holywood-Bangor	Ballymacarrett railway station

== Industrial usage and "coal quay" ==
Queen's Quay was used as an industrial location for over 150 years, from the 1840s up until the 1990s. It featured coal yards, scrapyards, shipyards and engine works. It became locally as "the coal quay" during this period. Prior to redevelopment, the scrapyards extended as far as the Queen Elizabeth Bridge.

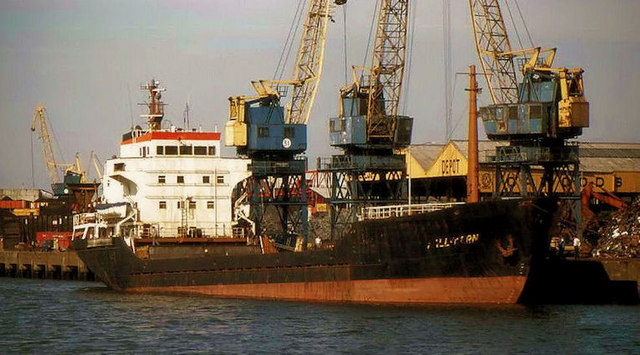
The "Ballykern" at Belfast. The same coaster, in the fleet of the Belfast shipowner and coal importer John Kelly Limited, discharging coal at Queen's Quay.

The coal quay was the centerpiece of Queen's Quay during this period, which featured bars such as the Canberra Bar and the Rising Tide, to serve shipyard workers, dockers and other industrial workers alike from the quay. Prior to redevelopment, the scrapyards extended as far as the Queen Elizabeth Bridge. The Canberra was named after the SS. Canberra, a large glass mural picturing the SS Canberra was located behind the bar. It was also known for its vegetable soup.

Various coal companies occupied the quay, including the most well-known and first, John Kelly Limited. This originated from Samuel Kelly setting up business on Queen's Quay in 1840 as a "grocer and commission coal merchant". Following expansion, the company was then incorporated in 1911, by his son, John Kelly. The economic important of rising coal industries was pivotal in the early 1900s to the success of Northern Ireland. Other coal companies during this period included Cawoods Coal and Hugh Craig & Co.

== Today ==
In part, Queen's Quay now encompasses the A2 as it crosses the River Lagan at both Queen's Bridge and the Queen Elizabeth Bridge, and the M3 via the Cross Harbour link. The former site of the B&CDR station was used for a maintenance shop for the Northern Ireland Railways system until the mid-nineties.

== Redevelopment ==
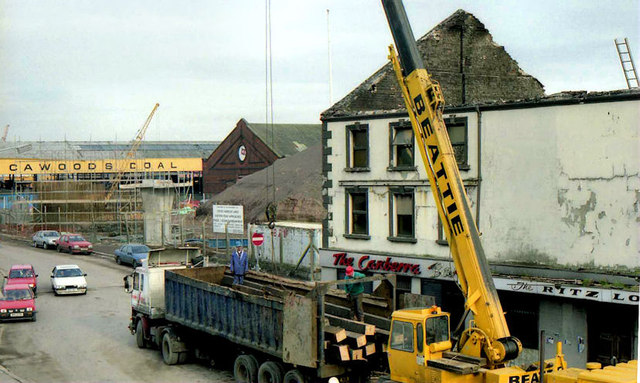
The Canberra Bar at Queen's Quay, during demolition. The background shows Cawoods Coal, October 1992.

Queen's Quay, being a virtually derelict and under developed piece of land in central Belfast, is key to the development of the Titanic Quarter. After a number of development proposals, discussions are still taking place for a mixed-use development of housing, offices and retail, together with a small facility for leisure boats. One of the reasons for change in the quay was down to how the city was perceived by tourists, such as sailing by boat down the River Lagan and coming from the east of the city from Belfast City Airport, the industrial look was seen as unpleasant and unattractive, and in some occasions, dangerous, due to materials and debris from the scrapyards encroaching onto the roads. Industries from the former coal quay have moved location since redevelopment. The bars and shops serving the industrial workers were also demolished.
