= Coal merchant =

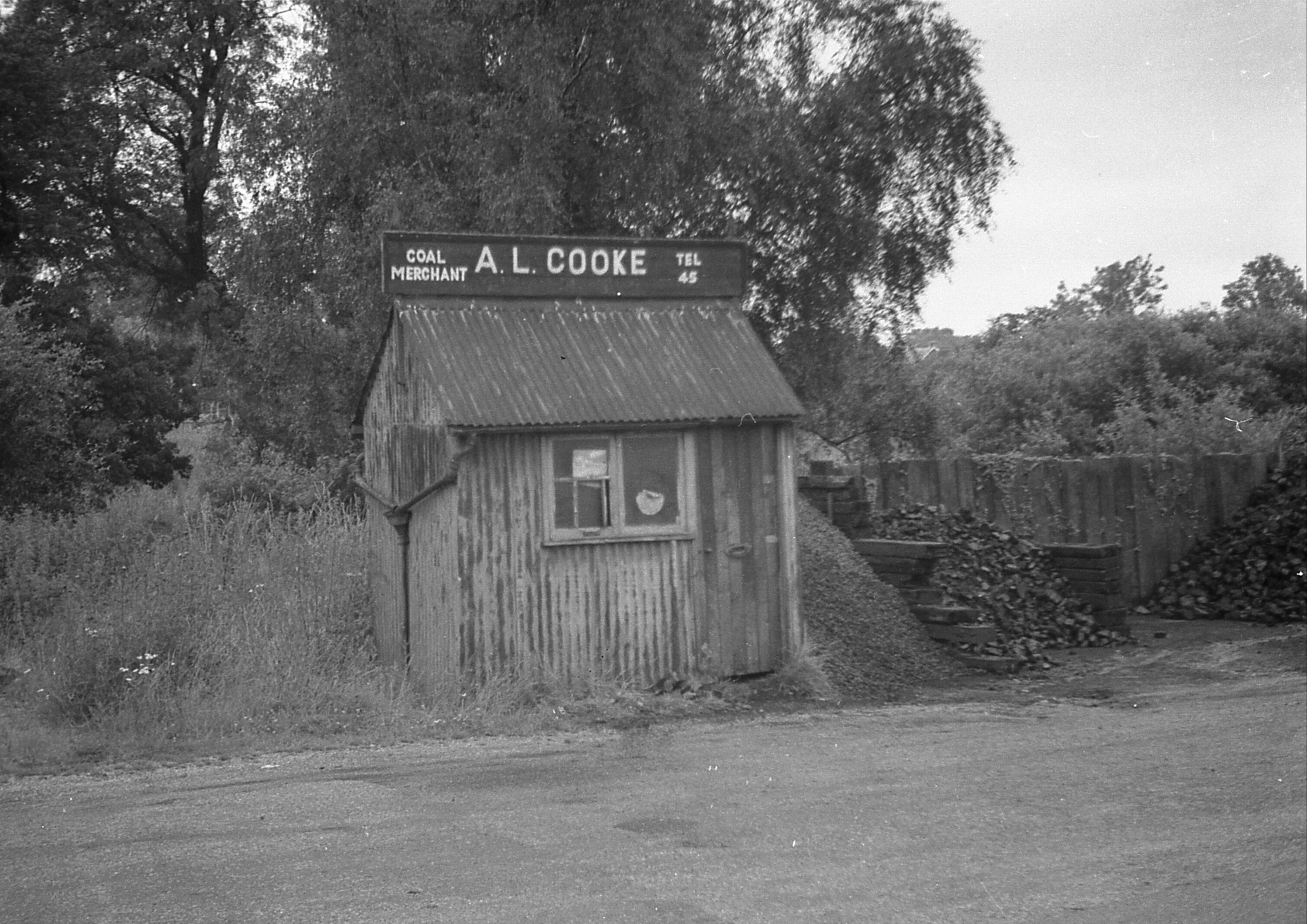
Local coal merchant in a station yard, Hook, Hampshire, England, 1965. Office at centre, coal stores on the right.

A coal merchant is the term used in the UK and other countries for a trader who sells coal and often delivers it to households. Coal merchants were once a major class of local business, but have declined in importance in many parts of the developed world due to the rise of alternative heating methods, including central heating, gas, oil and electric heating. The men who carried the coal to households were called coal men.

The mass of coal homes burned was large; the UK government estimated in 1975 that the average household burning solid fuel used about 4.7 tons per year.

== History ==
According to J. U. Nef, the term "coal merchant" in Britain originally meant "the owner, or part owner, of an east-coast collier [ship]" that would carry coal from mines near Newcastle to other parts of Britain, "but in the eighteenth century the word was applied to all kinds of London coal traders, including small retailers", while the shipper came to be called a coal dealer, although the terms were "seldom applied consistently" in this period. The development of canals in Britain led to wharves being established near towns to unload coal.

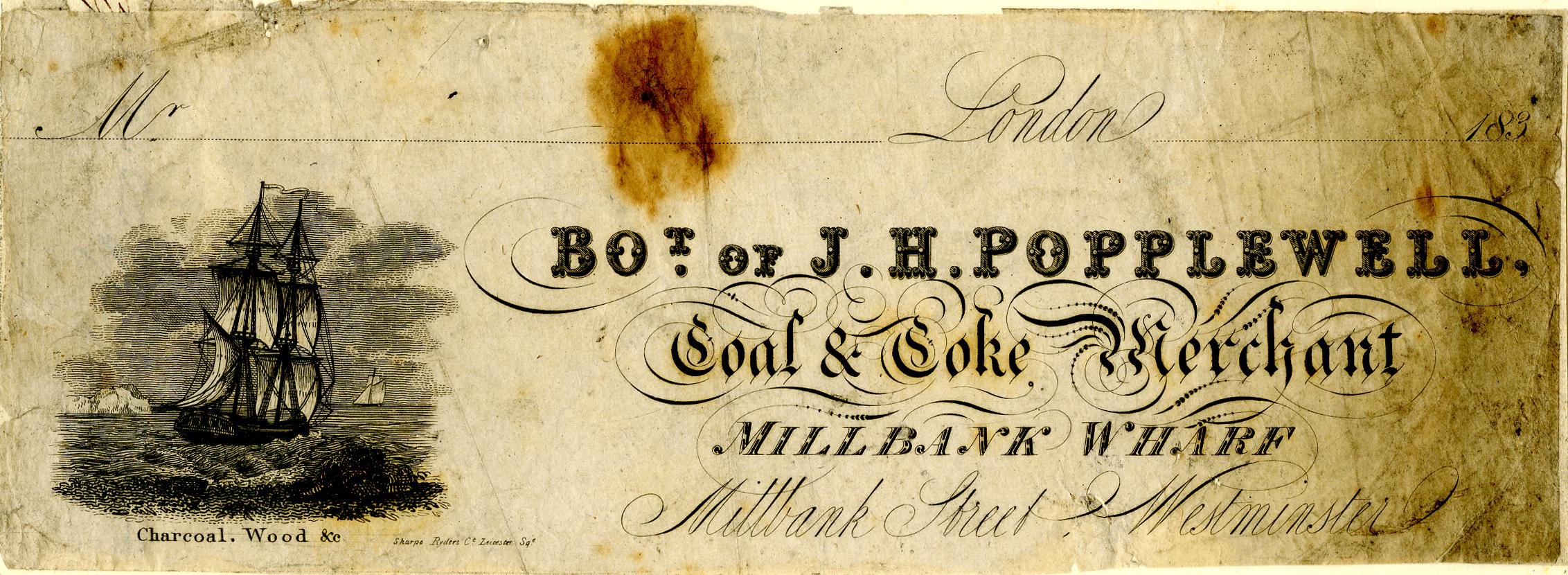
Bill-card of a London coal merchant, c. 1830

From the coming of the railways, coal merchants in the UK were typically based at railway stations in the goods yard, with coal delivered by train. Other possibilities were delivery by canal boat or by collier ship, or direct sale from the colliery in areas close to one, known as "landsale". The coal would then be transferred by cart or truck to local homes and businesses, sometimes into a coal hole, a hatch leading down to the cellar.

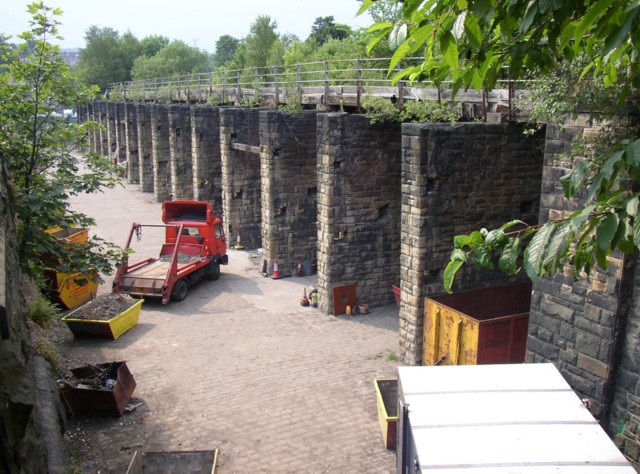
Coal drops for unloading coal from trains, Sowerby Bridge

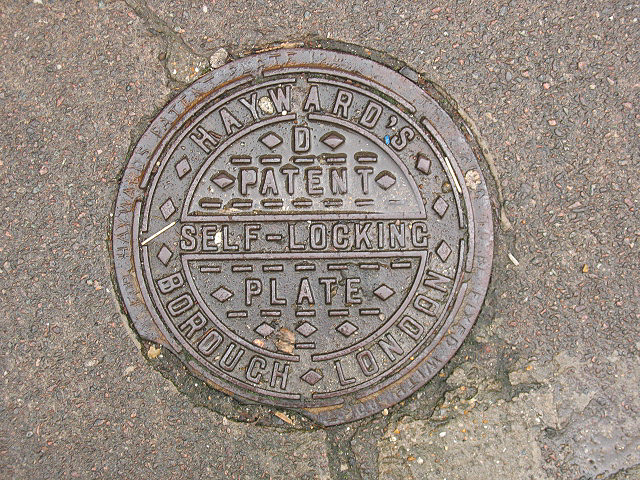
Coal hole, Southwark, London

Coal merchants in the railway era were typically small local businesses, although larger dealers did exist, and might buy their coal from a coal factor, also called a coal broker. According to John Armstrong, in London there was a "rough implicit division" with coal consignments to individual local coal merchants coming by railways while large power stations and factories, often near the Thames, received it by collier ship.

There was a risk of occupational injury from the back-breaking work of carrying the heavy sacks of coal. In Gelderland in the Netherlands it was common for deliveries to be done in summer when it was dry to stock up for winter to reduce dirt coming into the house.

== Post-war period ==
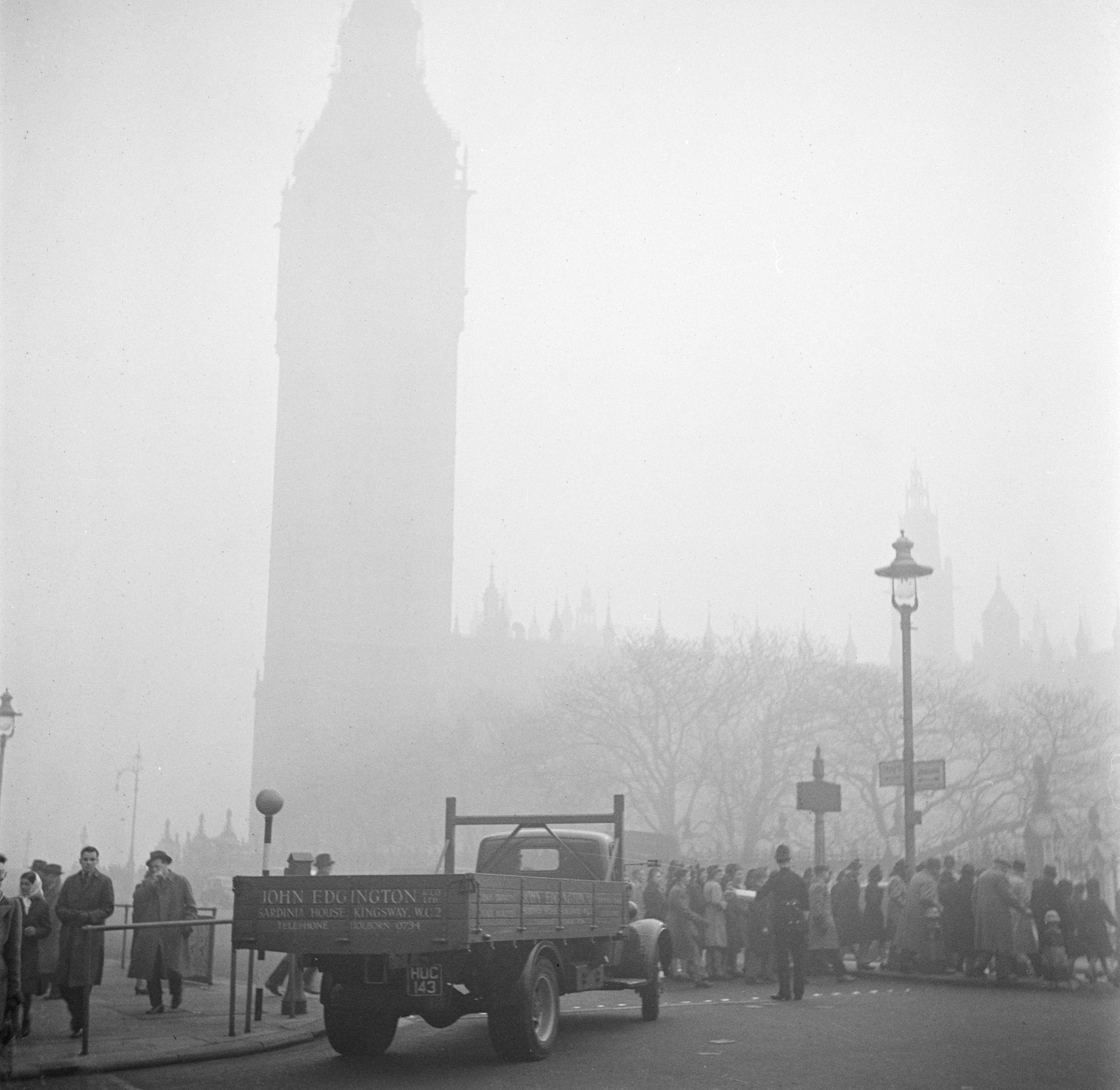
Smog in London from burning coal led to attempts to reduce consumption of coal, especially non-smokeless fuels, in the 1950s

During the post-war austerity period the nationalised National Coal Board promoted poor-quality "nutty slack" coal for consumer use so that higher quality coal could be exported or used elsewhere. The Clean Air Act 1956 attempted to switch UK consumption away from this towards smokeless fuel. In 1962 the NCB and traders set up a Coal Trade Code and promoted an "Approved Coal Merchant" mark, which continues to exist as of 2022.

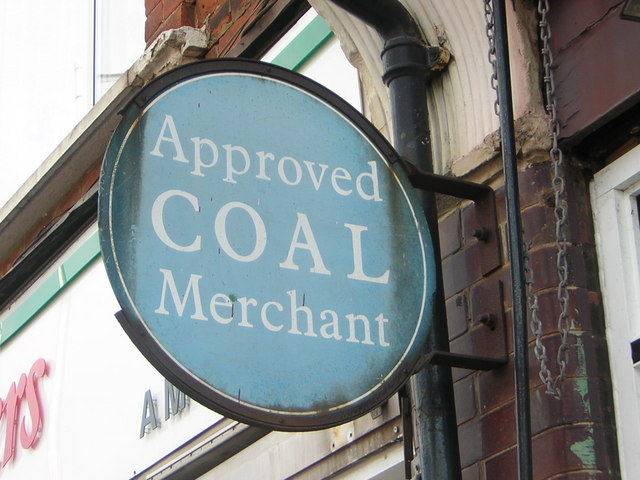
Approved Coal Merchant sign, South Norwood, London, 2005

From the 1950s, British Railways reduced wagonload freight to individual railway stations as part of the Beeching cuts, with supply to UK coal merchants often switching to delivery by road from large "coal concentration depots" where coal was unloaded from block trains. However, coal merchants often stayed trading in station yards.

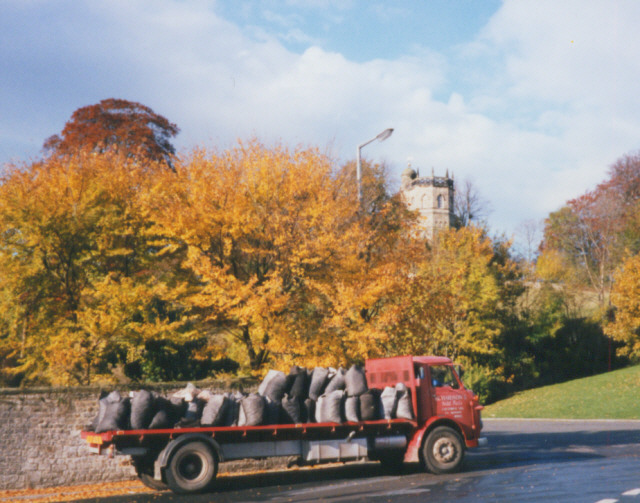
Coal delivery lorry, Richmond, North Yorkshire, 1994

Decline of rail shipment of coal generally led to the closure of concentration depots around the 1990s.

Coal merchants have declined due to new heating methods. Explaining his decision to sell his business in Swindon in 2015, one commented "business was good but it wasn’t growing any more. With the introduction of natural gases to Swindon and electric cookers, demand was slowing."

== See also ==
- Coal-tax post
