= List of bridges over the River Lagan =

The following is a list of bridges over the River Lagan in Northern Ireland listed going upstream from Belfast Lough.

Image	Name	Date	Carries	Design	Listing	Locality	Coordinates	Notes
Belfast
	Lagan Bridge	1995	M3 Motorway	Concrete; Box girder bridge	Not listed	Belfast	54°36′09.6″N 5°55′11.0″W	Connects the Sydenham Bypass with the M2 foreshore.
	Dargan Bridge	1994	Belfast–Derry railway line Belfast–Larne railway line	Concrete; Box girder bridge	Not listed	Belfast	54°36′08.8″N 5°55′12.0″W	Was built to connect all of Northern Ireland's railways into one network.
	Lagan Weir Footbridge	2015	Pedestrians, cyclists	Steel; Beam bridge	Not listed	Belfast	54°36′04.4″N 5°55′13.0″W	Replaced earlier bridge which was removed in 2014.
	Queen Elizabeth Bridge	1966	A2 (eastbound)	Steel; Girder bridge	Not listed	Belfast	54°36′01.0″N 5°55′13.7″W	
	Queen's Bridge	1843	A2 (westbound)	Stone; Arch bridge	B+	Belfast	54°35′58.9″N 5°55′13.7″W	Replaced the earlier Long Bridge. Named after Queen Victoria.
	Lagan Railway Bridge	1976	Belfast–Derry railway line Belfast–Larne railway line Belfast–Bangor railway line pedestrians	Steel; Beam bridge	Not listed	Belfast	54°35′51.5″N 5°55′02.2″W	Replaced a single track, wooden bridge built in 1875
	Albert Bridge	1890	A20 East Bridge Street	Cast iron Arch bridge	B+	Belfast	54°35′44.9″N 5°54′46.8″W	Replaced a previous bridge which suddenly collapsed.
	Ormeau Bridge	1863	A24 Ormeau Road	Stone; Arch bridge	Not listed	Belfast	54°34′58.5″N 5°55′19.0″W	Replaced a previous bridge, built in 1809.
	King's Bridge	1912	Eastbound road traffic	Concrete; Beam bridge	A	Belfast	54°34′38.2″N 5°55′42.7″W	One of the first reinforced concrete bridges in Ireland. Named after King George V.
	Governor's Bridge	1974	Westbound road traffic	Concrete; Beam bridge	Not listed	Belfast	54°34′30.1″N 5°55′51.2″W	Named after Ralph Grey, Baron Grey of Naunton, the last Governor of Northern Ireland
	Stranmillis Weir		Private pedestrian access		Not listed	Belfast	54°34′07.0″N 5°55′38.5″W	
	Lagan Gateway bridge	2021	Pedestrians and cyclists between Stranmillis and Annadale		Not listed	Belfast	54°34′6.7″N 5°55′40.5″W	A new lock was also built under the bridge. The bridge will be named after Noah Donohoe.
	Brown Bridge or Belvoir Bridge	2023	Pedestrians and cyclists between Belvoir Park Forest and Lagan Towpath	Wooden; Arch bridge	Not listed	Belfast	54°33′27.4″N 5°56′10.4″W	Original bridge replaced in 2023 due to safety concerns.
	Red Bridge		Pedestrians and cyclists on Lagan Towpath National Cycle Route 9	Iron; Beam bridge	Not listed	Belfast	54°33′12.1″N 5°56′37.1″W	
	John Luke Bridge	2013	Pedestrians and cyclists on Lagan Towpath National Cycle Route 9	Steel; Butterfly bridge	Not listed	Belfast	54°33′17.7″N 5°56′57.1″W	Replaced earlier bridge. Named to honour Belfast-born artist John Luke
			Water Main		Not listed	Belfast	54°33′17.9″N 5°57′07.2″W	
	Shaw's Bridge (new)	1977	A55 Malone Road	Concrete; Arch bridge	Not listed	Belfast	54°33′08.9″N 5°57′09.7″W	
	Shaw's Bridge (old)	1707	Pedestrians and cyclists	Stone; Arch bridge	B1	Belfast	54°33′08.1″N 5°57′10.8″W	Carried road traffic prior to the opening of its modern counterpart. Replaced a wooden bridge dating from the early 17th century
	Gilchrist Bridge	1986	Pedestrians and cyclists between Edenderry and Lagan Towpath	Wooden; Arch bridge	Not listed	Edenderry	54°32′36.6″N 5°57′54.0″W	Named after John Gilchrist, founder of Lagan Valley Regional Park
Belfast/Lisburn and Castlereagh
	Drum Bridge	before 1832	B103 Upper Malone Road	Stone; Arch bridge	B1	Drumbeg	54°32′06.5″N 5°58′59.3″W	
			Pedestrians and cyclists on Lagan Towpath National Cycle Route 9	Truss bridge	Not listed	Drumbeg	54°32′10.9″N 5°59′02.9″W	
		1962	M1 Motorway	Concrete; Box girder bridge	Not listed	Drumbeg	54°32′34.5″N 5°59′37.3″W	
Lisburn and Castlereagh
			Private access to house		Not listed	Derriaghy	54°32′20.3″N 6°00′12.5″W	
	Rambler's Bridge		Pedestrians and cyclists between Seymour Hill estate and Lagan Towpath	Truss bridge	Not listed	Derriaghy	54°32′15.5″N 6°00′23.8″W	
	Wolfenden's Bridge	before 1833	B103 Ballyskeagh Road	Stone; Arch bridge	B+	Lambeg	54°32′00.0″N 6°01′02.7″W	
	Lambeg Bridge		Tullynacross Road	Stone; Arch bridge	Not listed	Lambeg	54°31′42.8″N 6°01′27.7″W	
			Pedestrians and cyclists	Steel; Beam bridge	Not listed	Lambeg	54°31′42.5″N 6°01′28.0″W	
	Hilden Bridge		Bridge Street	Stone; Arch bridge	Not listed	Hilden	54°31′18.8″N 6°01′19.3″W	
		Mid 1900s		Single story building spanning the river on reinforced concrete beams	B+ (as part of mill complex)	Hilden	54°31′13.4″N 6°01′18.0″W	Gutted by fire in 2006
			Access within former Hilden Mill complex (bridge disused)		B+ (as part of mill complex)	Hilden	54°31′12.3″N 6°01′17.1″W	
		1896	Pedestrians within former Hilden Mill complex (bridge disused)	Iron Lattice girder bridge	B2	Hilden	54°31′05.0″N 6°01′21.5″W	
			Private pedestrian access over weir		Not listed	Lisburn	54°30′52.1″N 6°01′26.4″W	
	Blue Bridge		Pedestrians and cyclists	Concrete; Cantilever bridge	Not listed	Lisburn	54°30′48.9″N 6°01′27.2″W	
		2002	Pedestrian and cyclist access to Lagan Valley Island	Steel; Truss bridge	Not listed	Lisburn	54°30′44.1″N 6°02′05.0″W	
	Queen's Bridge	2002	Road traffic access to Lagan Valley Island	Concrete; Beam bridge	Not listed	Lisburn	54°30′42.3″N 6°02′11.6″W	
	Union Bridge	1880	A49 Sloan Street	Stone; Arch bridge	Not listed	Lisburn	54°30′35.8″N 6°02′17.6″W	Replaced earlier bridge
			Water pipe		Not listed	Lisburn	54°30′32.0″N 6°02′25.1″W	
	Moore's Bridge	1825	A1 Hillsborough Road	Sandstone; Arch bridge	B1	Lisburn	54°29′55.6″N 6°03′08.2″W	
			Pedestrians and cyclists on Lagan Towpath National Cycle Route 9	Steel; Arch bridge	Not listed	Lisburn	54°29′51.6″N 6°03′22.5″W	
	Young's Bridge		Halftown Road		Not listed	Lisburn	54°30′01.4″N 6°05′50.8″W	
	Maze Bridge		Gravehill Road	Stone Arch bridge	Not listed	Mazetown	54°29′42.3″N 6°06′58.4″W	
	The New Bridge		Cockhill Road		Not listed	Halfpenny Gate	54°29′07.8″N 6°08′47.2″W	
	Spencer's Bridge	1840-1859	Hillsborough Road	Stone Arch bridge	B1	Moira	54°28′38.8″N 6°10′33.1″W	
			M1 Motorway		Not listed	Moira	54°28′35.5″N 6°11′22.0″W	
	Newmill Bridge	1740-1759	Clarehill Road	Stone Arch bridge	B2	Moira	54°28′26.8″N 6°12′20.9″W	
Armagh City, Banbridge and Craigavon
	Steps Bridge		Steps Road		Not listed	Magheralin	54°27′48.2″N 6°14′48.5″W	
	Forge Bridge		B9 New Forge Road	Stone Arch bridge	B2	Magheralin	54°27′31.5″N 6°15′34.2″W	
	Geehan's Bridge		B2 Dromore Road	Stone Arch bridge	B1	Waringstown	54°26′41.1″N 6°16′21.6″W	
	Banoge Bridge		Hall Road	Stone Arch bridge	B2	Donaghcloney	54°25′14.3″N 6°16′12.6″W	
			Pedestrians to former Ewart Liddell Weaving Factory (bridge disused)		Not listed	Donaghcloney	54°24′52.4″N 6°15′36.6″W	
	Donaghcloney Bridge		B9 Main Street	Stone Arch bridge	Not listed	Donaghcloney	54°24′55.9″N 6°15′24.3″W	
	Thornyford Bridge	1760-1779	Blackskull Road	Stone Arch bridge	B1	Gamblestown	54°25′18.5″N 6°12′54.6″W	
	Gillhall Bridge	1670s	Private access to farm	Stone Arch bridge	B+	Dromore	54°25′00.0″N 6°12′11.4″W	Was built to provide access to Gill Hall mansion. The house was built at the same time as the bridge and was said to be haunted. It burnt down in 1969.
			Private access to farmland		Not listed	Dromore	54°25′01.4″N 6°11′05.2″W	
			Private access to B&B		Not listed	Dromore	54°24′52.2″N 6°10′18.3″W	
		1972	A1 Dromore Bypass		Not listed	Dromore	54°24′50.1″N 6°09′40.3″W	
	Dromore Viaduct	Early 1860s	Trackbed of the former Banbridge, Lisburn and Belfast Junction Railway	Stone Viaduct	B+	Dromore	54°24′49.2″N 6°09′38.7″W	Disused since the railway closed in 1956
			Pedestrians in Dromore Park		Not listed	Dromore	54°24′45.3″N 6°09′31.6″W	
			Pedestrians in Dromore Park		Not listed	Dromore	54°24′46.3″N 6°09′26.3″W	
	Regent Bridge	1811	B2 Banbridge Road	Stone Arch bridge	B1	Dromore	54°24′51.4″N 6°09′04.7″W	
	Downshire Bridge	1885	Bridge Street	Stone Arch bridge	B2	Dromore	54°24′50.3″N 6°08′58.7″W	
			Caughey's Road		Not listed	Dromore	54°24′34.9″N 6°07′20.5″W	
			Lurganbane Road		Not listed	Dromore	54°24′21.4″N 6°05′49.1″W	
	Lagangreen Bridge		Lagangreen Road		Not listed	Kinallen	54°24′09.4″N 6°04′48.7″W	
		1800-1819	Black Bog Road	Stone Arch bridge	B1	Kinallen	54°23′52.4″N 6°04′25.1″W	
			Kinallen Road		Not listed	Kinallen	54°23′34.1″N 6°04′03.7″W	
Armagh City, Banbridge and Craigavon/Lisburn and Castlereagh
			Artanagh Road		Not listed	Kinallen	54°23′11.5″N 6°02′42.6″W	
		1780- 1799	Dromore Road		B2	Dromara	54°23′08.8″N 6°02′07.6″W	
		1800-1819	Banbridge Road	Stone Arch bridge	Not listed	Dromara	54°22′47.9″N 6°01′12.9″W	
			Moybrick Road		Not listed	Dromara	54°22′39.6″N 6°01′25.3″W	
			Private access to farmland		Not listed	Dromara	54°22′39.1″N 6°01′14.8″W	
	Bell's Bridge	1800-1819	B7 Rathfriland Road	Stone Arch bridge	B2	Dromara	54°22′13.8″N 6°01′06.7″W	
Newry, Mourne and Down
		1800-1819	Dree Hill (road)	Stone Arch bridge	Not listed	Finnis	54°21′44.4″N 6°01′26.0″W	
			Private access to farm		Not listed	Finnis	54°21′20.6″N 6°00′59.8″W	
			Dree Hill (road)		Not listed	Finnis	54°21′14.7″N 6°00′49.0″W	
