= Queen's Bridge =

Queen's Bridge or Queens Bridge may refer to:

- Queen's Bridge, Belfast, a bridge in Belfast, Northern Ireland, U.K.
  - Queen's Bridge railway station, in operation here 1876–1960
- Queen's Bridge, Perth, a bridge in Perth, Scotland, U.K.
- Queen's Bridge (New Jersey), a bridge in Somerset County, New Jersey, U.S.
- Queens Bridge (Melbourne), a bridge in Melbourne, Victoria, Australia

== See also ==
- Queen Elizabeth Bridge, Belfast
- Queensbridge (disambiguation)
