= Ormeau Bridge =

Bridge in Belfast, Northern Ireland

Coordinates: 54.5829°N 5.9219°W

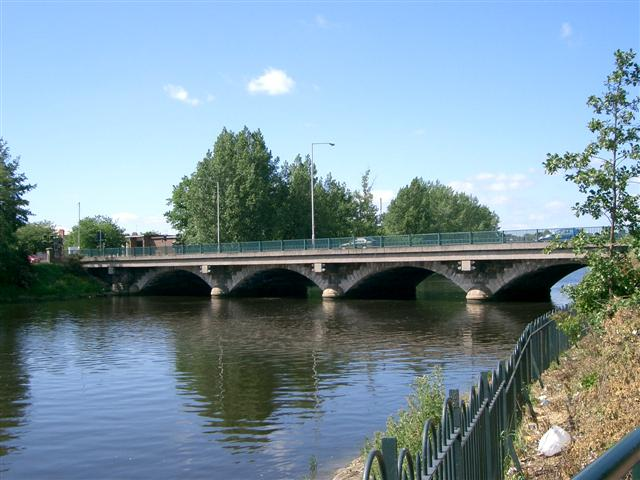
The Ormeau Bridge, looking upstream, in 2011

The Ormeau Bridge is a road bridge in Belfast, roughly 80m long, carrying the A24 Ormeau Road across the River Lagan from Stranmillis Embankment to Ormeau Embankment.

The bridge was opened in 1863 and designed by Charles Lanyon to a near-identical standard as his earlier Queen's Bridge. It replaced an earlier, less stable structure dating from 1809. At some point in the 20th century the bridge was widened to accommodate increased traffic, by the addition of cantilevered segments on either side.

At the junction with Annadale Embankment is a ghost bike.

== See also ==
- List of bridges over the River Lagan

| Next bridge upstream | River Lagan | Next bridge downstream |
| King's Bridge | Ormeau Bridge | Albert Bridge |
