= Lagan Railway Bridge =

Bridge in Belfast

Coordinates: 54.5976°N 5.9173°W

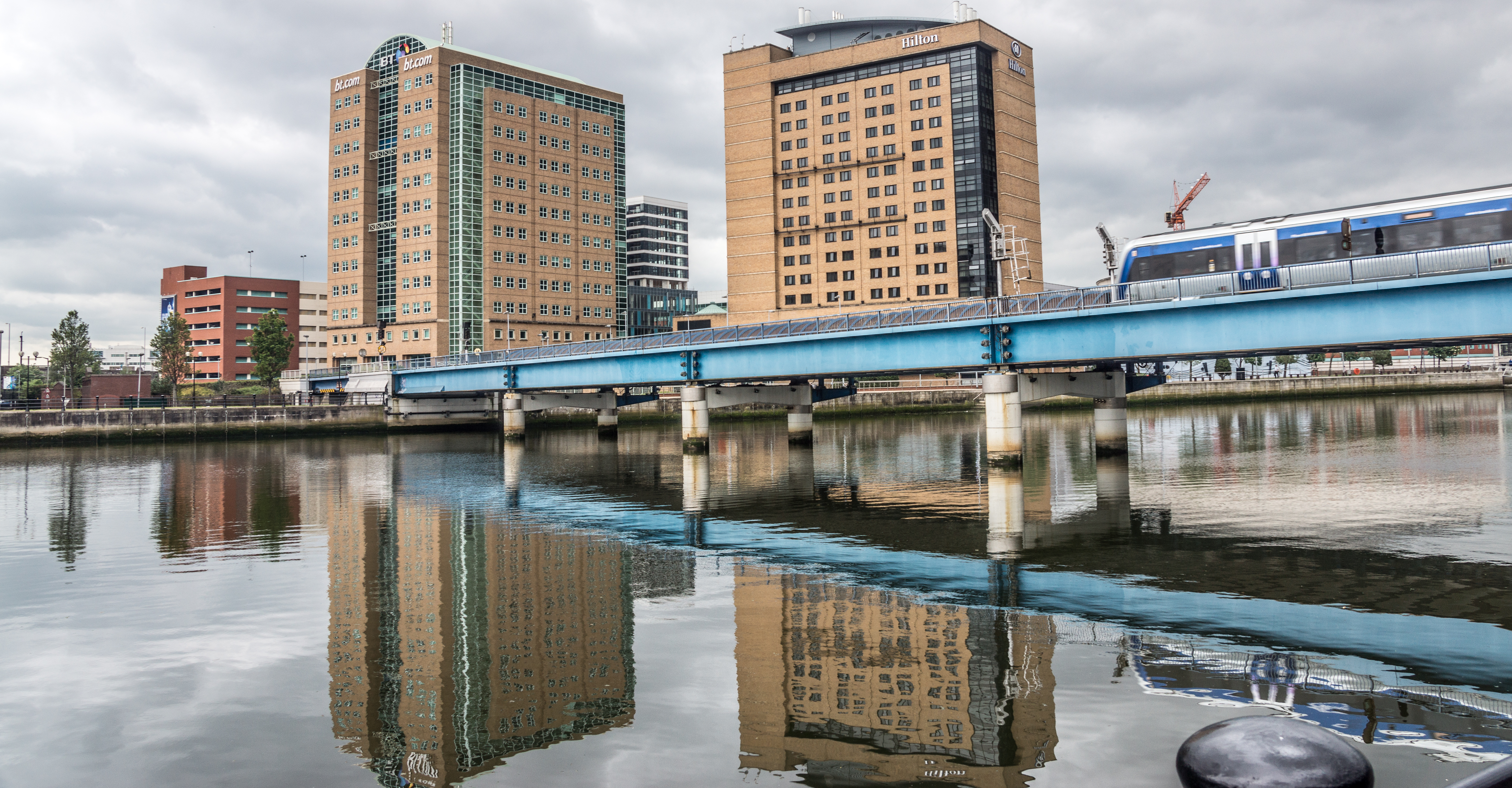
Lagan Railway Bridge, looking towards Central station.

Lagan Railway Bridge is a railway and pedestrian bridge across the River Lagan in Belfast, slightly north of Belfast Central railway station. The next bridge upstream is the Albert Bridge, whilst the next downstream is Queen's Bridge.

Next bridge upstream	River Lagan	Next bridge downstream
Albert Bridge	Lagan Railway Bridge	Queen's Bridge

== Original bridge ==
From 1875 to 1965, a more rudimentary structure existed in the same location. Built by the Belfast Central Railway as part of its line which linked the Great Northern Railway and the Belfast and County Down Railway, it was a single track eight-span wooden bridge. Heavier locomotives were banned from crossing it, and by the time it was closed by the Ulster Transport Authority in 1965, it had earned the nickname, ''The Lagan Shaky Bridge''. It was subsequently demolished shortly after closure.

== Current bridge ==
The current structure was opened by Northern Ireland Railways in 1976 as part of the work to reopen the Belfast Central Railway line to passenger traffic. It is double track and supported by four piers. It has six spans (including one over Laganbank Road and is 440 feet (130 m) long. Immediately to the north of the bridge is Lagan Junction, where the Bangor line and Larne/Derry lines diverge at a level junction, with the latter veering to the left and crossing the Lagan again over the Dargan Bridge. On the downstream side of the bridge is a pedestrian walkway, linking Laganbank Road, which the railway part of the bridge crosses and Laganview Court.

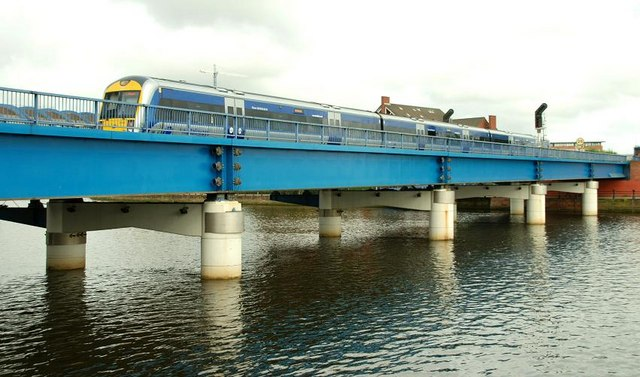
A train crossing the bridge.

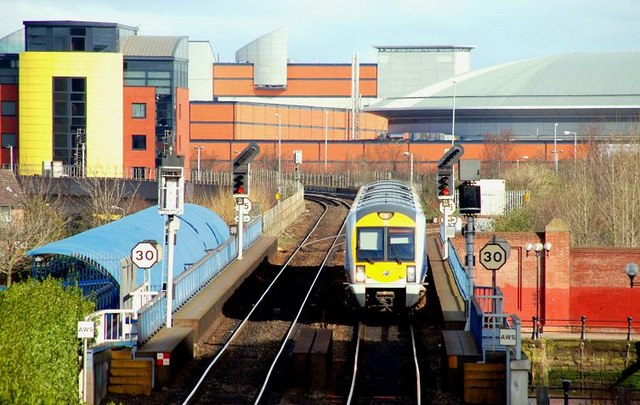
The bridge as seen from East Bridge Street.

== See also ==
- List of bridges over the River Lagan
