= Albert Bridge, Belfast =

Road bridge in Belfast

Albert Bridge
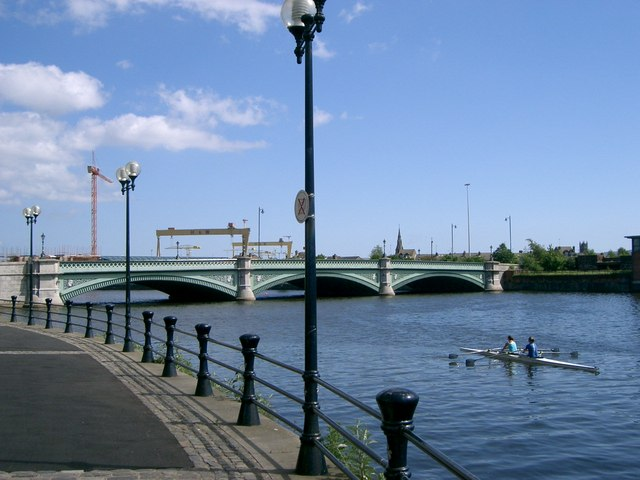
- Coordinates: 54°35′45″N 5°54′50″W
- Carries: A20
- Crosses: River Lagan
- Locale: Belfast
- Named for: Prince Albert Victor
- Heritage status: Grade B+

Characteristics
- Material: Granite / Cast Iron
- No. of spans: 3

History
- Designer: J.C. Bretland
- Opened: 6 September 1890

Location
- Interactive map of Albert Bridge

Albert Bridge is a bridge in Belfast, Northern Ireland. Its three flat arches span the River Lagan. It was completed in 1890 by Belfast city surveyor J C Bretland and is named after Prince Albert Victor. It is located close to the city centre between East Bridge Street and the Albertbridge Road.

== History ==
The previous bridge on this site was a privately owned five span masonry bridge which was built in 1831. It was officially called Lagan Bridge, although it was known as Halfpenny Bridge due to the toll charged. It was subsequently renamed to Albert Bridge after Queen Victoria's husband. In 1860 it was acquired by the Belfast Corporation, which abolished the toll. In 1886 two arches of the bridge collapsed, causing a single fatality. A temporary wooden bridge was erected until the completion of the replacement bridge. This new bridge was designed by Mr J. C. Bretland, the Borough Surveyor of Belfast at the time, and was constructed by Messrs Henry of Belfast on behalf of Belfast Corporation, at a cost of £36,500. All of the cast iron including the decorative lampposts were made in Derby by Andrew Handyside & Co. It was opened in 1890 and the name Albert Bridge was kept, but now in honour of Queen Victoria's grandson, Prince Albert Victor, who had laid a foundation stone in 1889.

In the 1950's, the Hastings Bar was renamed to the Prince Albert Lounge. It sits at the bottom of the Albertbridge Road, at the junction facing the Newtownards Road McDonald's. Its name derives from the influence of the naming of the Albertbridge / Albertbridge Road. It is known colloquially as "The Albert".

== Restoration ==
In 1998 the first phase of work on the bridge was carried out by Roads Service, involving replacing, strengthening and waterproofing the concrete bridge deck. The second phase replaced corroded wrought iron structural members supporting the bridge deck with new structural steel members. The final phase, in autumn 2001, involved the removal of existing paint and rust and application of a new paint system for corrosion protection, which should ensure no repainting will be needed for the next 15 years. Floodlighting was also being installed. Total cost of restoration was about £1 million.

The original drawings and sketches of the bridge from 1888 had been passed to Roads Service from Belfast Corporation at the time of local government reorganisation in 1973. The drawings were used for information on the works connected with the bridge and passed to the Public Record Office of Northern Ireland in 2001.

Next bridge upstream	River Lagan	Next bridge downstream
Ormeau Bridge	Albert Bridge	Lagan Railway Bridge

== See also ==
- List of bridges over the River Lagan
