= Albert Square (disambiguation) =

Albert Square is a fictional location in the British television soap opera EastEnders. It may also refer to:

- Albert Square, Manchester, England
- Albert Square, an address in Stockwell, London, England
- Albert Square, an address in Dundee, Scotland, and home to the offices of D. C. Thomson & Co.
- Albert Square, an address near the Lagan Weir in Belfast, Northern Ireland
