= Governor's Bridge =

Governor's Bridge may refer to

- Governor's Bridge, Belfast, a bridge across the River Lagan in Belfast, Northern Ireland
- Governor's Bridge (Isle of Man), a road junction and point on the historic TT races Snaefell Mountain Course
- Governor's Bridge, Toronto, a neighborhood in Toronto
- Governor's Bridge (Patuxent River), a bridge dating to the colonial-era in Maryland
