= Killinure =

Townland in County Down, Northern Ireland

Killynure (Irish: Cill an Iúir, meaning 'church of the yew') is a townland in County Down, Northern Ireland, lying on the south-east border of Carryduff.

The townland is approximately 770 acres (3.1 km²) in area, and still consists mostly of farmland, although since the 1990s, the housing developments of Carryduff have begun to encroach on its north-west corner (including the Killynure Estate).

The 'Church of the Yew' which gave the townland its name possibly existed in the 9th century, with the most probable site being at Flowe Farm on Killynure Road West. Local records record that a schoolhouse was constructed in 1795 on the site, re-using existing stone from a ruin in the field, which also contained several yew stumps. A couple of 3rd century Roman coins were also found nearby.

Killynure Road runs north-south through the townland, connecting Carryduff and Saintfield, passing close to the summit of Ouley Hill. Use of the road is attested as far back as the 17th century, and it formed part of the main stagecoach route between Belfast and Downpatrick. However, horses struggled ascending Ouley Hill, and in the latter half of the 19th century, a new road between Carryduff and Saintfield was constructed, bypassing the hill: this is still in use today as the modern A7.

Killynure Road West leaves the Killynure Road at Ouley Hill and runs westward, to meet the A24 road (which connects Carryduff to Ballynahinch).

Killynure Avenue, a small road which runs between the Killynure Road and the A7, leading to Lisdoonan townland, is lined with numerous ash trees.

The townland contains a few small streams which join the Carryduff River, ultimately flowing into the Lagan some miles north at Minnowburn.
