= King's Bridge, Belfast =

Bridge in Belfast, Northern Ireland

Coordinates: 54°34′38″N 5°55′43″W

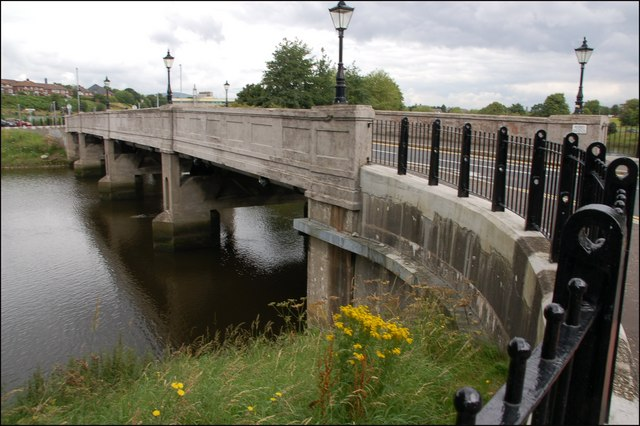
King's Bridge in 2007

King's Bridge is a road bridge across the River Lagan in South Belfast, Northern Ireland. It opened in 1912 and is named after King George V. Made of reinforced concrete, it is believed to be the first road bridge of this type in Ireland.

The bridge forms part of a one-way system along with the neighbouring Governor's Bridge. Together they connect the Stranmillis and Annadale Embankments, with King's Bridge carrying traffic from the former to the latter.

== History ==
King's Bridge was built to connect Sunnyside Street to the east with Ridgeway Street to the west. Stranmillis and Annadale Embankments weren't built until the 1920s. It was constructed by W.J. Campbell & Son for Belfast Corporation to a design by the Trussed Concrete Steel Company of Westminster. It was originally intended to build the bridge at an angle across the river in line with the two streets, but this was ruled out by the Belfast Harbour Commissioners due to the greater effect this would have had on barge traffic.

== Structure ==
The bridge uses the Kahn system of reinforced concrete, which consists of steel bars of a diamond cross section within the concrete. The bars are bent upwards to provide additional strength. It crosses the river in four spans, with a total span of 195 feet (59 m). The bridge has a width of 30 feet (9.1 m), with two traffic lanes, and a pavement on each side.

Next bridge upstream	River Lagan	Next bridge downstream
Governor's Bridge	King's Bridge	Ormeau Bridge

== See also ==
- List of bridges over the River Lagan
