= Governor's Bridge, Belfast =

Road bridge in Belfast, Northern Ireland

Coordinates: 54°34′30″N 5°55′51″W

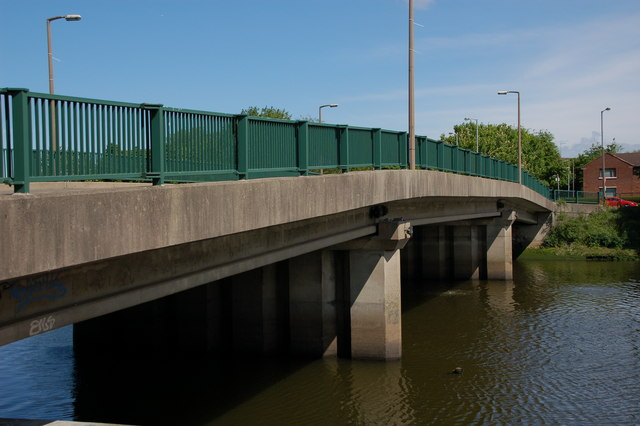
Governor's Bridge in 2007

Governor's Bridge is a road bridge in Stranmillis, south Belfast. It was inaugurated on 23 September 1974. It was named after Ralph Grey, Baron Grey of Naunton, the final Governor of Northern Ireland, who left office in June 1973.

The bridge forms part of a one-way system along with the neighbouring King's Bridge. Together they connect the Stranmillis and Annadale Embankments, with Governor's Bridge carrying traffic from the latter to the former.

A pedestrian and cycle underpass, which opened in 2001, carries National Cycle Route 9 under the bridge on the west side. The underpass is below the waterline and a pump prevents its flooding.

Next bridge upstream	River Lagan	Next bridge downstream
Stranmillis Weir	Governor's Bridge	King's Bridge

== See also ==
- List of bridges over the River Lagan
