= Dargan Bridge, Belfast =

Railway bridge in Belfast, Northern Ireland

Coordinates: 54°36′9″N 5°55′13″W

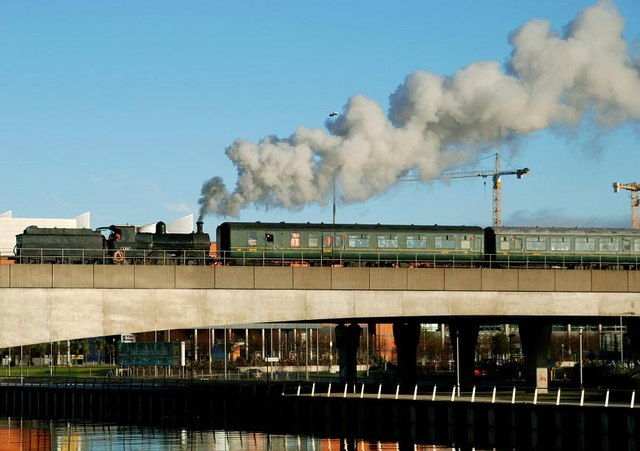
Steam train on Dargan Bridge, December 2008

Dargan Bridge is a railway bridge which crosses the River Lagan in Belfast, Northern Ireland. Opened in 1994, it directly connected the Dublin and Bangor lines with the lines to Larne and Derry for the first time. It is named after the Irish railway engineer William Dargan and is the longest bridge on the island of Ireland.

Next bridge upstream	River Lagan	Next bridge downstream
Lagan Weir	Dargan Bridge	M3 Lagan Bridge

== History ==
Northern Ireland Railways first proposed what was then called the 'Cross Harbour Link' in 1978. Construction was scheduled to begin in 1980, however the project was cancelled by the direct rule government in 1979. The scheme was later revived and was included in the urban area plan which was published in 1990. In preparation for the new line, Yorkgate station was opened on 17 October 1992, replacing York Road Station. The bridge was then constructed and opened to traffic on 28 November 1994. It was officially opened by Elizabeth II on 9 March 1995.

== Structure ==
Dargan Bridge is a concrete viaduct 4,675 feet (1,425 m) in length and is parallel to Lagan Bridge. It carries a single-track railway, which has a passing loop as it crosses Corporation Street. There was planned to be a station here called Donegall Quay, which was originally due to open in 1997, but so far it has not been built.

== Gallery ==
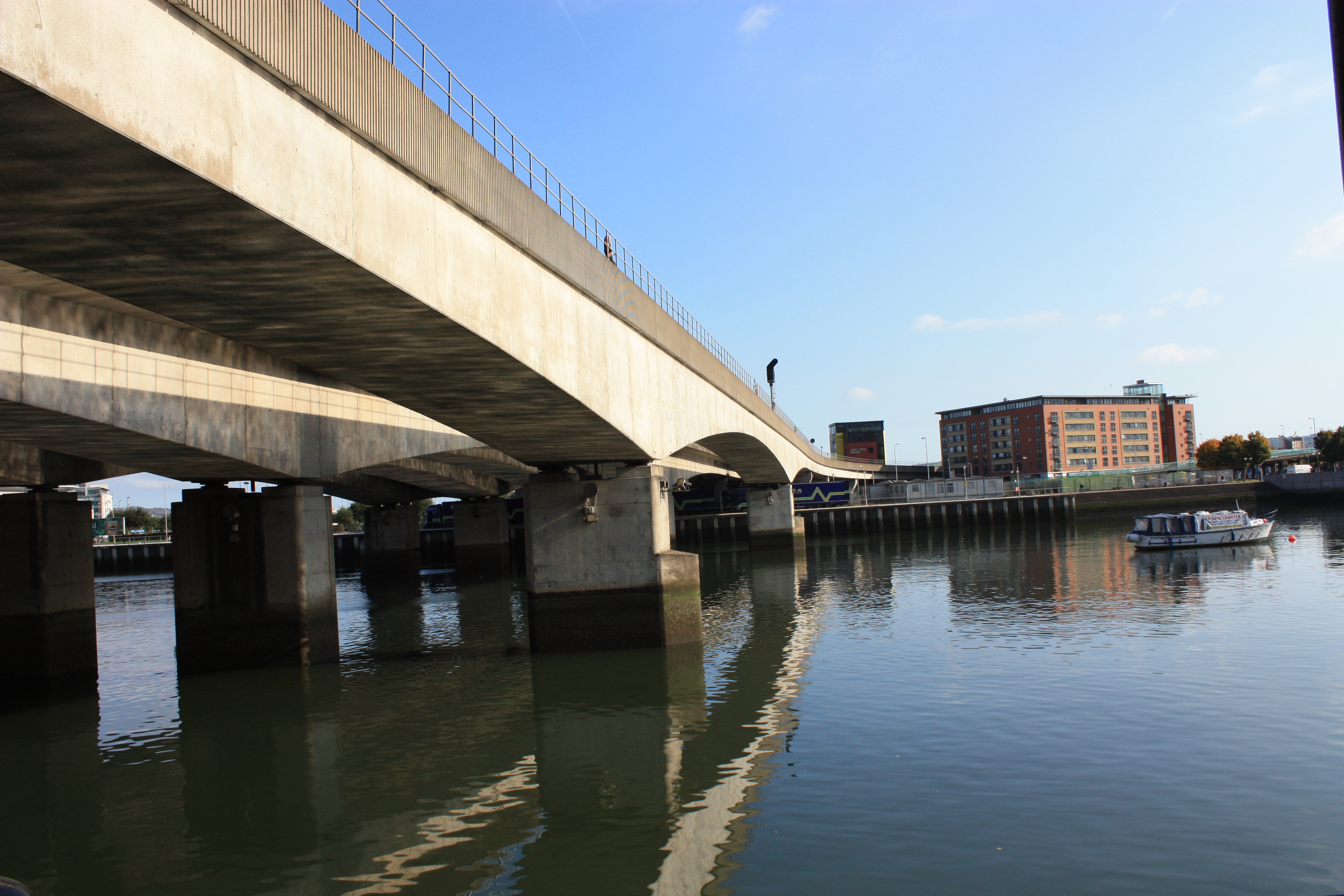
Dargan Bridge (right), October 2009

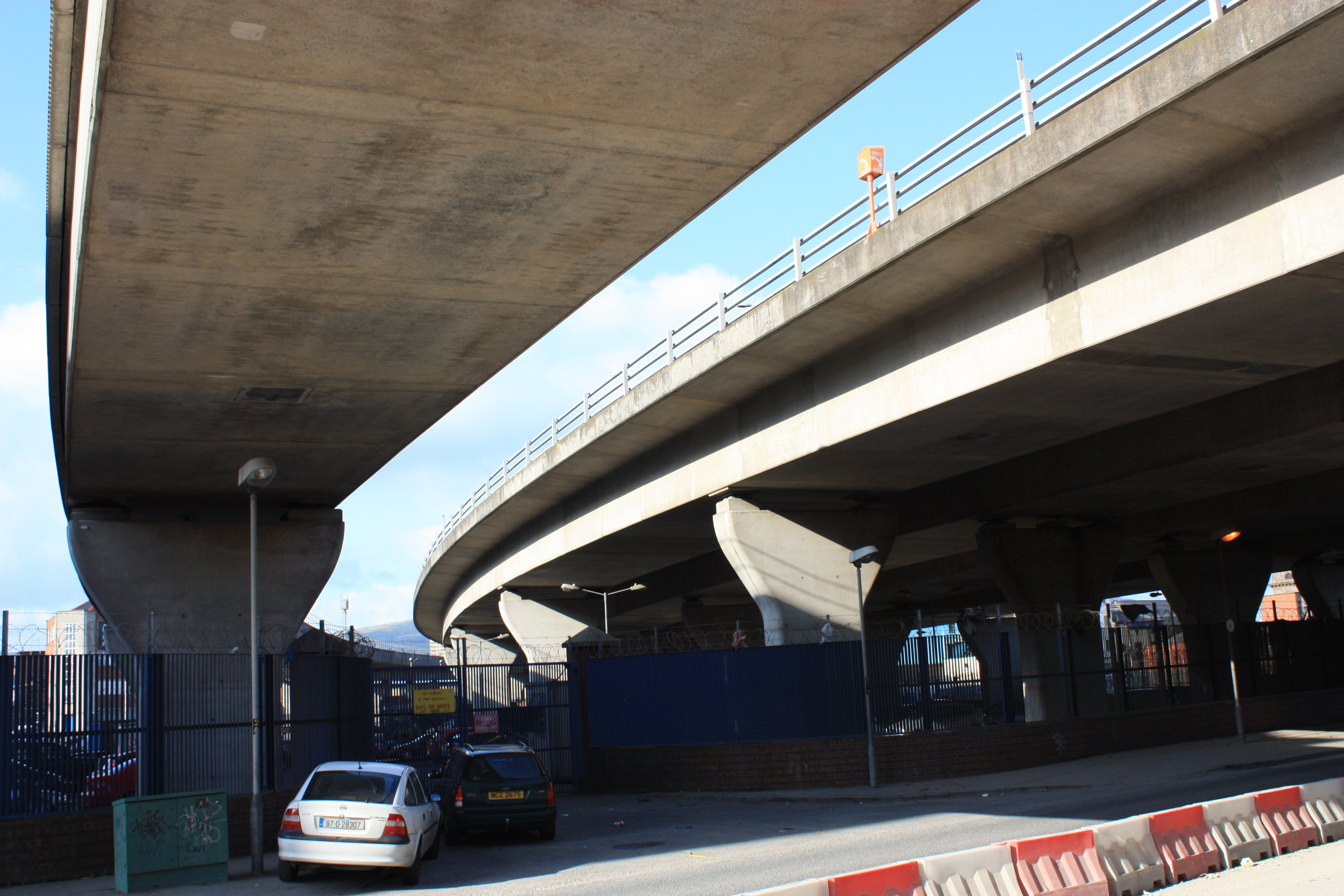
Dargan Bridge (left), October 2009

== See also ==
- List of bridges over the River Lagan
- William Dargan Bridge, Dublin
