= Ormeau Road =

Street in Belfast, Northern Ireland

Coordinates: 54.58582°N 5.92318°W

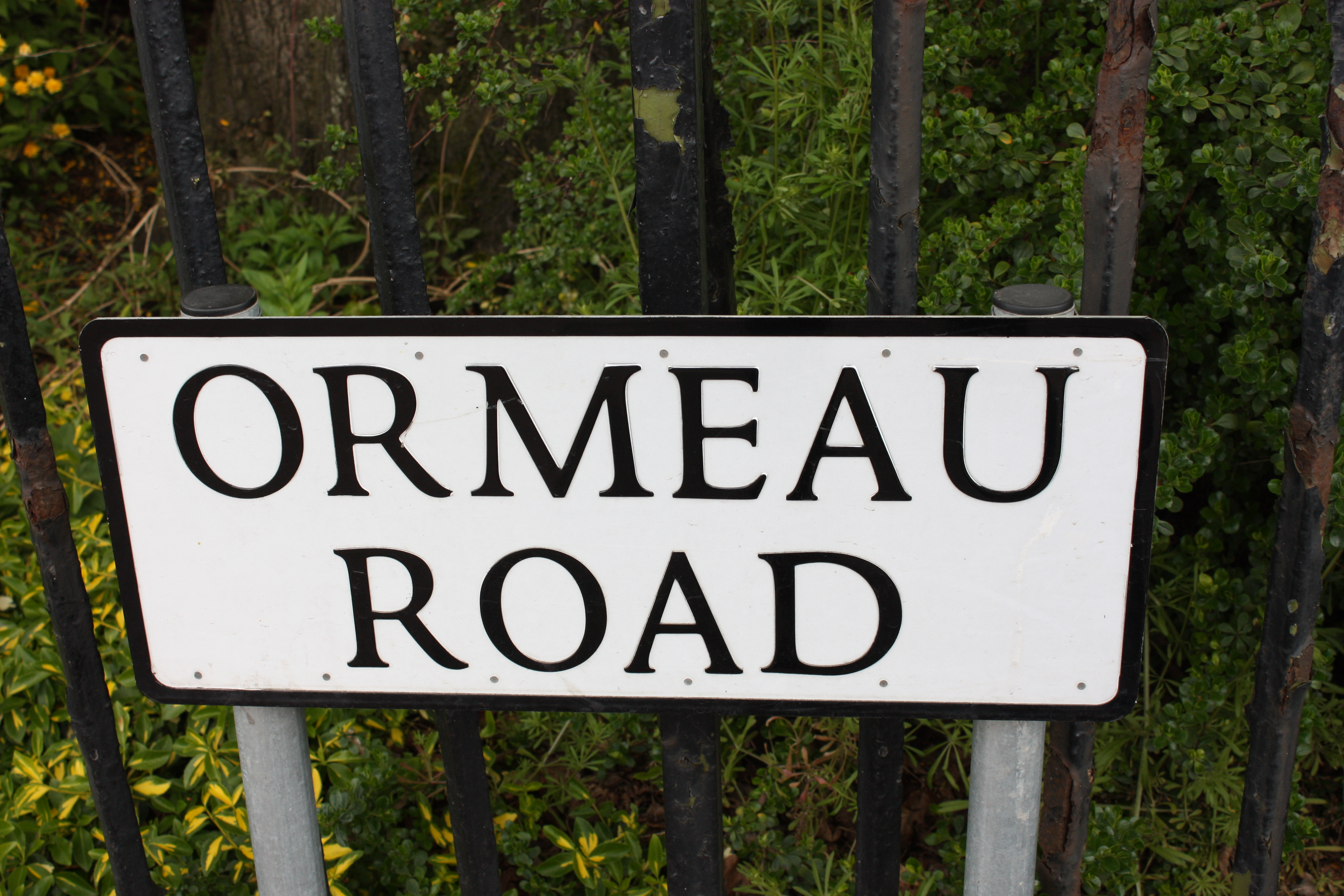
Ormeau Road, May 2010

Ormeau Road is a road in south Belfast, the largest city and capital of Northern Ireland. Ormeau Park is adjacent to it. It forms part of the A24.

== History ==
The road, as currently laid out, dates from the first decades of the 19th century when a bridge was built connecting Newtownbreda village to Belfast. This route was known more commonly as the New Ballynafeigh Road before eventually taking on the name of Ormeau House, the Marquess of Donegall's residence.

Ravenhill Road was the Old Ballynafeigh Road. Ballynafeigh is the name of the townland through which most of the Ormeau Road runs. It is an anglicisation of the Irish Baile na Faiche meaning 'townland of the lawn or green'.

== Areas of the Ormeau Road ==
=== Start of the road ===
The area at the start of the Ormeau Road is not known by a single name but contains a number of features. Close to the Markets area is the site of the former Belfast Gasworks, originally built in the 19th century and remaining open for its original purpose until 1988. The area has been substantially redeveloped under the Laganside Corporation and now includes a number of office buildings for companies such as Halifax The Gasworks is also home to the Radisson Blu Hotel Belfast.

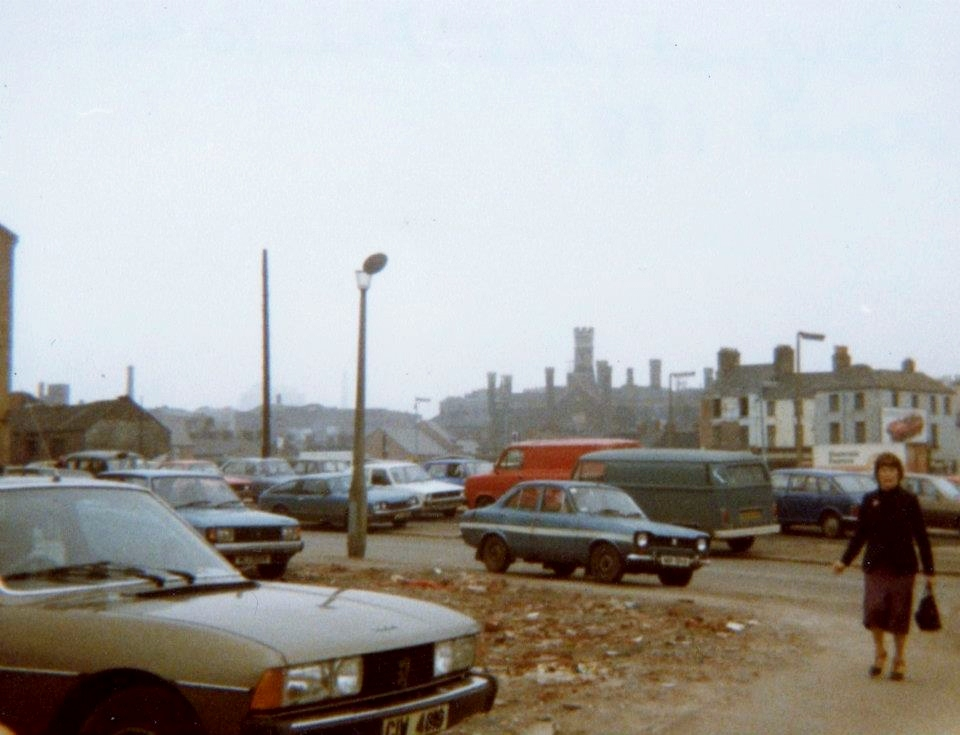
Loyalist Donegall Pass, 1981

Donegall Pass faces the Gasworks and, for a short period in the 1970s and 1980s, represented a violent interface with the Markets area. Donegall Pass has a rich social history and has a plethora of Chinese shops and restaurants, Indian wholesalers, local cafe and sandwich bars, a pharmacy, churches, antique dealers and a newly opened auction house.

Other features include the former headquarters of UTV plc, Havelock House, which was home to UTV from the station went on air in October 1959 until late 2017. The headquarters of Belfast CityBeat are situated very close to Havelock House, just over the Havelock Bridge (which crosses the main Belfast to Dublin railway line which runs under the Ormeau Road).

The Ormeau Road between Donegall Pass and the Ormeau Bridge includes the Belfast South constituency offices of both Sinn Féin and the Social Democratic and Labour Party (SDLP).

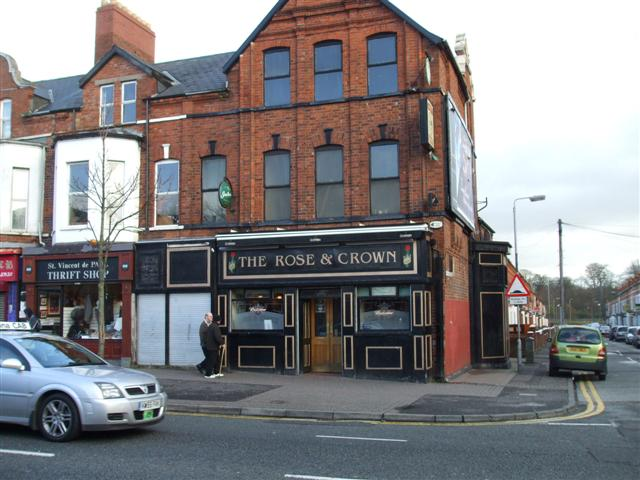
The Rose and Crown pub on the Lower Ormeau Road, where six civilians were killed by a UVF bomb in May 1974

This part of the Ormeau Road suffered a number of attacks during the Troubles when both Protestant and Catholic residents were killed.

In the mid-1990s the Ormeau Road became associated with political controversy as a result of parades by bands from Ballynafeigh Orange Lodge. Claims were also made that members of the Lodge had demonstrated triumphalism over the murder of five men in Sean Graham's bookmakers by the Ulster Defence Association.

In 1996, the dispute spilled over into conflict between the Lower Ormeau Residents' Action Group and the Royal Ulster Constabulary after widespread rioting led the police to effectively seal off the area for two days. The Parades Commission initially supported the marchers in the dispute although since 1999 parades have been banned from the area, even leading to the Orange Order briefly using the Ormeau Park as its meeting place instead of Edenderry.

Until 1999, the North of Ireland Cricket and Football Club's home stadium, the Ormeau Cricket Ground – one of the earliest international rugby venues in Ireland – was in the area, although, following a series of perceived sectarian arson attacks, the club's merger with Collegians into the Belfast Harlequins has seen the demolition of the stadium, which has been redeveloped as housing, known as Lavinia Square and Mews.

The Holyland, an area mainly inhabited by university students faces this area on the western side of the road.

The "Lower Ormeau Road" is the part of the road north of the bridge.

=== South of the bridge ===
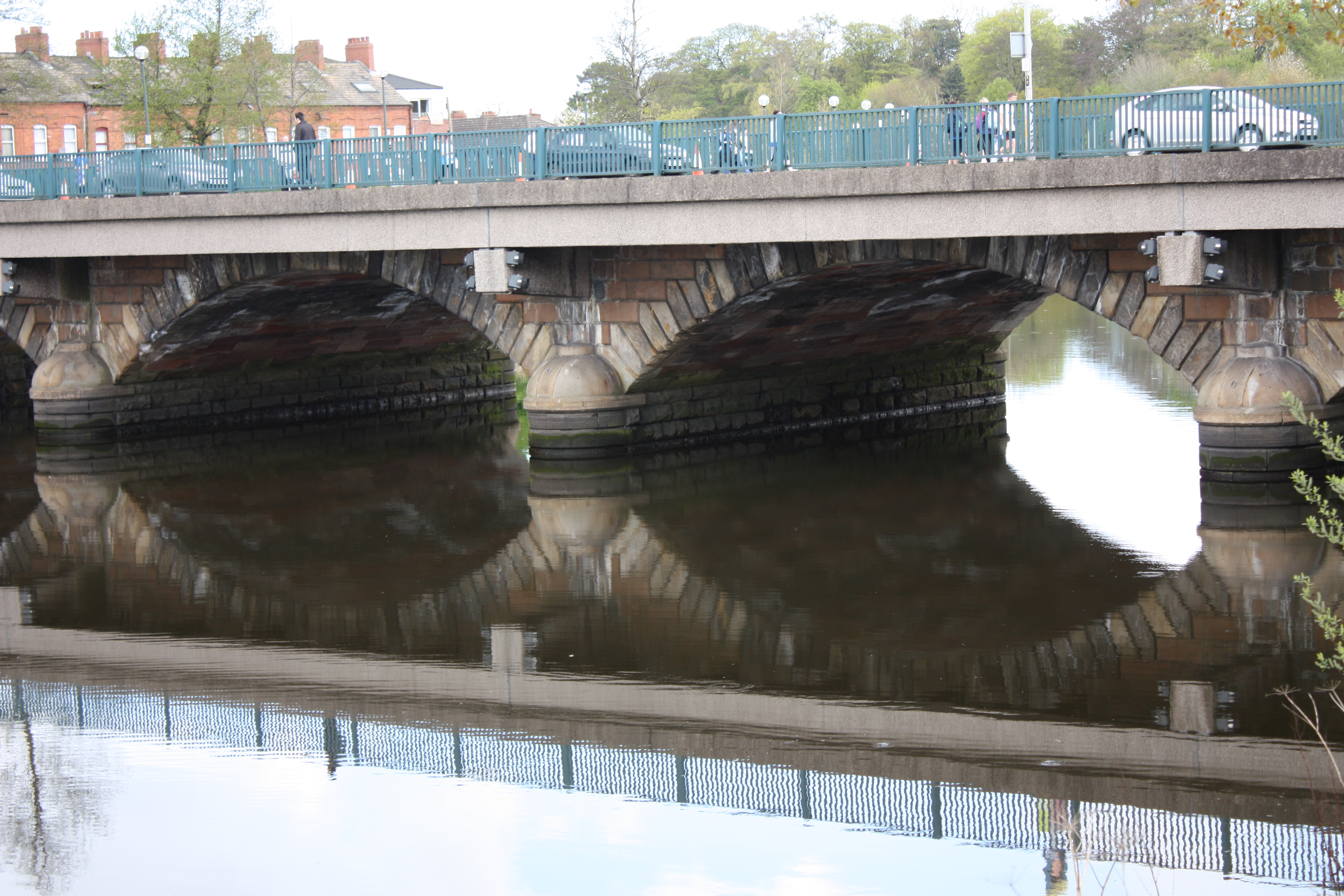
Ormeau Bridge, May 2010

A number of local buildings and services, such the Community Development Association, the Post Office and the Orange Hall, use the name Ballynafeigh, although the wider (and older) townland of Ballynafeigh also includes much of the lower Ormeau and Holyland.

The Ormeau Bridge is a significant part of the architecture and history of the wider area. Work began on the bridge in 1809 and was opened within a year or so. This bridge was demolished as unusable however and was not fully rebuilt until 1863. The Lagan forms the boundary between County Antrim, encompassing the inner-city districts, and County Down, lying to the south-east.

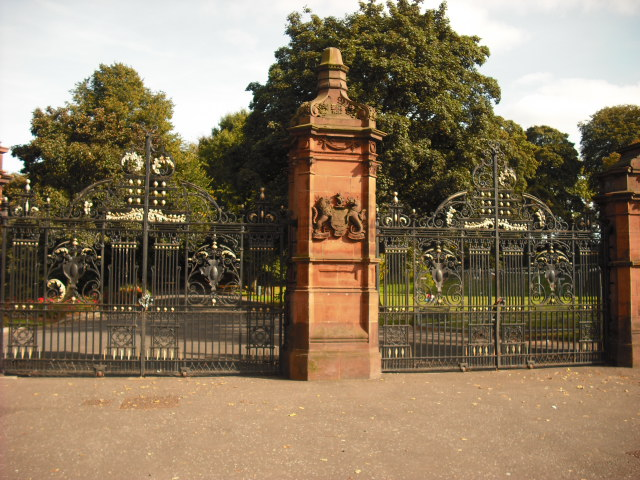
Entrance gates to the Ormeau Park, 2009

Ormeau Park is the city's oldest municipal park, dating back to 1871 and stretches from the Ormeau Road to the Ravenhill Road. It is also the home of Ormeau Golf Club. Outside the Park a cycle path has been added to the road. The park was considered as an alternative venue for a new multi-purpose sports stadium, although First Minister Ian Paisley vetoed the plans. Ormeau Park originally extended beyond its present Southern border taking in, what is now, Park Road, North Parade and South Parade. The original stone wall still exists and runs along the rear entry of the houses on the south side of the houses of South Parade. The wall can be seen where the entry opens out onto the Ormeau Road.

Ormeau Park has, from the start of the twentieth century, been used for all sorts of social and communal gatherings. It was the scene of the first meeting of the Ulster Vanguard on 18 March 1972 when William Craig called on his followers to attend following his decision to leave the Ulster Unionist Party. Joined by an estimated 100,000 followers Craig made a controversial speech in which he stated that "we must build up a dossier of the men and women who are a menace to this country because if and when the politicians fail us, it may be our job to liquidate the enemy".

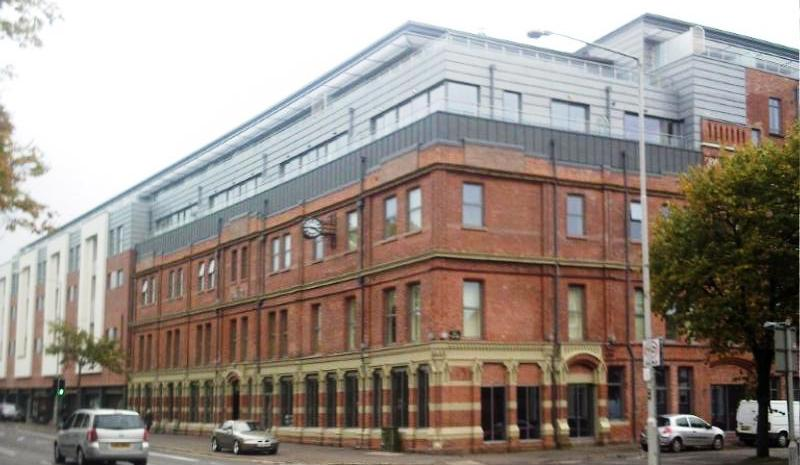
Redeveloped Ormeau Bakery, October 2010

Ormeau Bakery was the home of Ormo bread, formerly the largest independent bakery in Ireland. Robert Wilson set up the Ormeau Bakery in 1875, revolutionising the way that bread was made and distributed. The Bakery buildings were opened by Robert Wilson in 1890 and thrived under three generations of the Wilson family, the exterior of the building changing little over the years. The company celebrated its 125th anniversary in 2002 but was then bought out by Mother's Pride, leading to a closing of the site. The bakery has been redeveloped as upmarket, luxury apartments with roof gardens and other decorative touches according to designs by Diarmuid Gavin.

Cooke Centenary Church, a Presbyterian place of worship that faces the Bakery, is unique on the road as having no number in its postal address being simply Ormeau Park, Belfast. The church was named to mark the centenary of the birth of Henry Cooke.

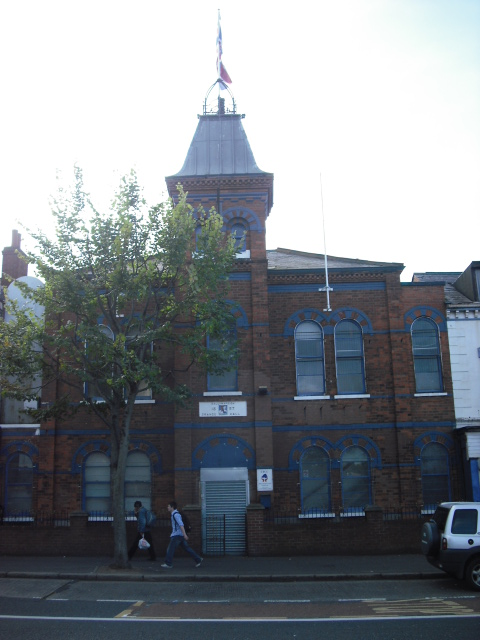
Ballynafeigh Orange Lodge, 2009

Ballynafeigh Orange Lodge is situated on the Ormeau Road and is the main centre for Orangeism in the area. The Lodge was formed in 1887 according to the plaque above the door. An Apprentice Boys of Derry flute band is affiliated to the Lodge.

Holy Rosary Church, and the accompanying detached parochial house, was opened in October 1898 to meet the needs of the growing Catholic population of this part of Belfast. It remained in use until September 1980 when all worship moved across the Ormeau Road to the much larger former convent chapel belonging to the Congregation of Our Lady of Charity of the Good Shepherd. This larger church sits adjacent to the roundabout at the junction of the Ormeau and Ravenhill Rds.

The convent's former gate lodge, a historic building within the grounds of the Good Shepherd Church was restored in 2009 and was initially home to the Belfast Buildings Preservation Trust.

=== South of the roundabout ===
Encompassing the areas of Rosetta and Galwally, this part of the Ormeau is a largely middle class area. It is served by local schools including Holy Rosary Primary School, St. Michael's Primary School, Rosetta Primary School, Wellington College, Aquinas Grammar School and St Joseph's College (the latter having been formed in September 1992 by the amalgamation of St Monica's girls' school and St Augustine's boys' school).

The area is also home to the Rosario Youth Club, whose senior soccer team Rosario YC F.C. play in Division 1A of the Northern Amateur Football League. The club's teams, which compete in a number of age groups, are based at the Ulidia playing fields, opposite Ballynafeigh Orange Hall.

Bredagh GAC, a local Gaelic Athletic Association club, play in the nearby Cherryvale Playing Fields on the Ravenhill Road.

=== End of the road ===
The Ormeau Road ends near Hampton Park, and become Saintfield Road near Forestside Shopping Centre.

== Geography ==
The Ormeau Road begins with the merger of Cromac Street and Ormeau Avenue. The road continues to Church Road where it merges into the Saintfield Road.

== Politics ==
Ormeau Road is part of the Belfast South and Mid Down constituency and, at the 2024 United Kingdom general election the constituency returned Claire Hanna of the SDLP as Member of Parliament, having represented the area in the Northern Ireland Assembly from 2015 until 2019 when she was first elected to represent the area at Westminster, in the former Belfast South constituency.

As of May 2002, the area is represented in the Northern Ireland Assembly by Matthew O'Toole (SDLP), Paula Bradshaw (Alliance), Kate Nicholl (Alliance), Deirdre Hargey (Sinn Féin) and Edwin Poots (DUP, Speaker since 2024).

Within Belfast City Council, the area was formerly part of the Laganbank District Electoral Area which had existed since 1985. It became part of the Botanic DEA for the first time in the 2014 local elections and in 2019 Emmet McDonough-Brown (Alliance; son of Jimmy Brown), Deirdre Hargey (Sinn Féin), Tracy Kelly (DUP), Aine Groogan (Green) and Gary McKeown (SDLP) were elected to Belfast City Council.

The area formerly lent its name to the Belfast Ormeau parliament constituency which was represented by Thomas Moles from 1918 to 1922.

== See also ==
- Belfast South (Assembly constituency)
- Belfast South (Northern Ireland Parliament constituency)
- Belfast South (UK Parliament constituency)
- Havelock House, Belfast
- Ormeau Park
- Rosario Youth Club F.C.
