= Carryduff River =

River in County Down, Northern Ireland

Coordinates: 54.53199°N 5.90146°W

The Carryduff River (Irish Abhainn Cheathrú Aodha Dhuibh) is a minor river in County Down, Northern Ireland. It is a direct tributary of the River Lagan and is not navigable.

== Course ==
The river rises in Killinure townland, in the boggy ground at the northern base of Ouley Hill (186 metres), and is fed by numerous drainage ditches as it passes through the farmland to the south of the town of Carryduff. From here it passes beside Knockbracken open reservoir and flows north down through a gap in the Castlereagh Hills, renamed Purdy's Burn. It then flows into the Lagan Valley, and joins the River Lagan at Minnowburn.

The Carryduff River has been covered over and encased in a pipe for some of its urban stretches.

== Settlements and routes ==
The original village of Carryduff grew up at the point where the routes south out of Belfast to Downpatrick and Newcastle, and the east–west routes from Hillsborough to the head of Strangford Lough, all met at the Carryduff River.

== Water quality ==
Its water quality has been rated as BAD by the Dept of the Environment's water service.

== Leisure ==
It is a frequent bathing spot for the local Killinure population.
