= National Cycle Route 9 =

Cycle route between Belfast and Newry in Northern Ireland, with plans for Dublin

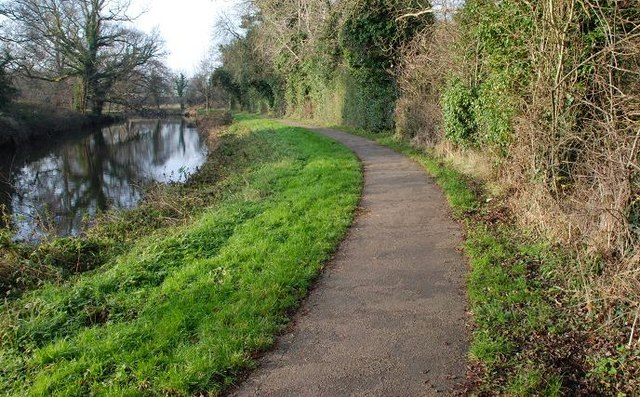
- The route follows a section of the River Lagan towpath

- Waymark
- Website: Official website

National Cycle Route 9 (or NCR 9) is a route of the United Kingdom National Cycle Network, running from Belfast to Dublin. It is the lowest-numbered route on the National Cycle Network outside of Great Britain.

== Route ==
The route will eventually connect Belfast and Dublin. The route is currently signposted between the Queen Elizabeth Bridge in Belfast and Newry. The portion south of Newry past Slieve Gullion was scrapped on safety grounds in 2020.

=== Belfast to Newry ===
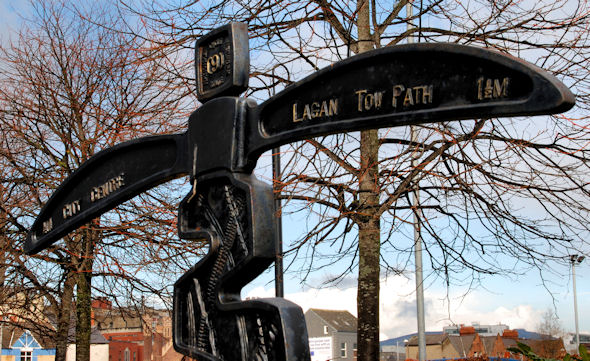
National Cycle Network milepost, Belfast

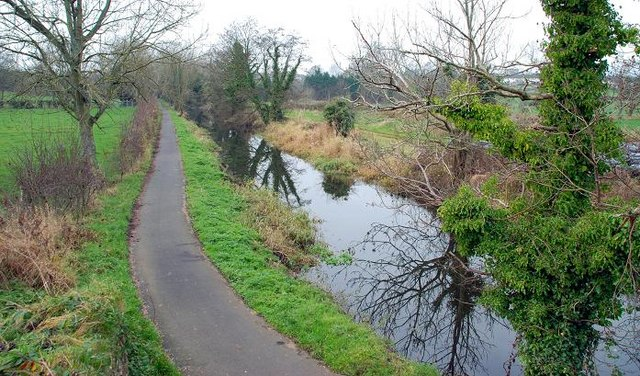
NCR 9 section following the Lagan Towpath

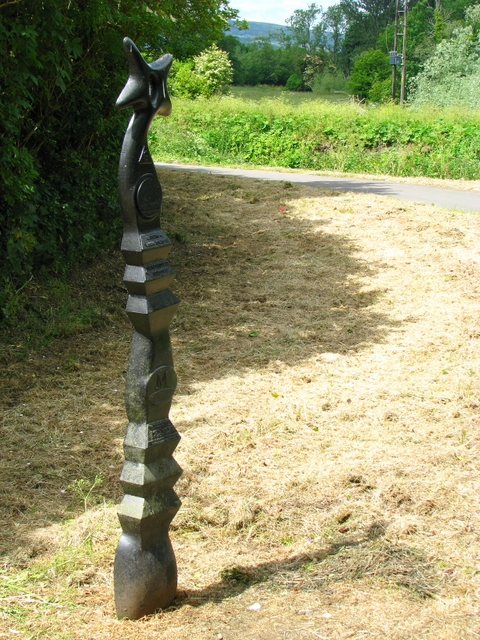
Milepost near Drumbeg, County Down

Belfast | Lisburn | Craigavon | Portadown | Newry

NCR 9 begins at the west side of the Queen Elizabeth II Bridge, where it connects with National cycle routes 93 and 99. It runs south along the River Lagan to the Island Arts Centre in Lisburn. After leaving Lisburn it runs west, roughly following the M1 motorway to Portadown. In Portadown NCR 9 links with National Cycle Route 94.

At Portadown the route heads south down the Newry Canal Towpath. Approximately 4.5 km (2.8 miles) down the towpath the route links with National Cycle Route 91 and Regional Route 10. At Scarva station there is a second link with another branch of National Cycle Route 91. From Newry it passes through Camlough to the base of Slieve Gullion.

The Belfast to Lisburn section is a slow and winding route along a path that is suitable for road bikes. One route is going to Newry railway station then cycling to Portadown railway station, therefore avoiding going up a steep hill from Newry city centre to Newry railway station.

=== Newry to Dublin ===
Newry | Dundalk | Drogheda Dublin

Work is underway in Dublin on the 1.4km Liffey-Tolka Project (1.4km), linking the city centre with the planned 3.2km Tolka Estuary Greenway via Dublin Port, and the Fingal Coastal Way, a 32km walking and cycling route in Fingal that will run through Newbridge Demesne, Donabate, Rush, Loughshinny, Skerries and Balbriggan. As of April 2021, there had been no announcements regarding the connecting segments in counties Meath and Louth.

In Dublin Docklands the route with link with the Royal Canal Greenway and EuroVelo 2, and will connect with the Greater Dublin Area Cycle Network.
