= Laganside Corporation =

The Laganside Corporation was a non-departmental public body formed by the Laganside Development (Northern Ireland) Order 1989 with the goal of regenerating large sections of land in Belfast, Northern Ireland adjacent to the River Lagan. This development area was expanded in 1996 to include areas closer to the city centre.

The Lagan riverside suffered in particular from poor environmental conditions and the decline of the shipbuilding industry in the 1970s and 80s.

The corporation was wound up in March 2007 and its responsibilities transferred to the Department for Social Development.

== History ==
The Department of the Environment-commissioned Laganside Concept Plan was completed in March 1987, an initiative of Chris Patten and Richard Needham, two Northern Ireland Office ministers. To deliver this plan, Laganside Ltd. was established in October 1987 as an interim measure; the Laganside Development Order (Northern Ireland) 1989 established the Laganside Corporation in May 1989.

The corporation's original mission statement was:

"to contribute to the revitalisation of Belfast and Northern Ireland through the regeneration of the Laganside area. It has one target: for every £1 of expenditure, investment levels of £5.20 must be achieved. Its current mission statement reflecting a change in emphasis is contributing to the revitalisation of Belfast and Northern Ireland by transforming Laganside to be attractive, accessible and sustainable, recognised as a place of opportunity for all".

Laganside Corporations aims closely followed the Urban Delivery Corporation model:

- "The object of the Corporation shall be to secure the regeneration of the designated area. The object is to be achieved in particular by the following means:
  - By bringing land and buildings into effective use.
  - By encouraging public and private investment and the development of existing and new industry and commerce.
  - By creating an attractive environment.
  - By ensuring that housing, social, recreational and cultural facilities are available to encourage people to live and work in the area."

The corporation was wound up in March 2007 and its responsibilities transferred to the Department for Social Development under the terms of the Laganside Corporation Dissolution Order (Northern Ireland) 2006.

== Developments ==
Waterfront Hall and the adjacent Hilton Hotel alongside the River Lagan

Developments associated with the Laganside Corporation included:

- Lagan Weir. This weir, completed in 1994, was built across the Lagan between the Queen Elizabeth Bridge and the M3 bridge (completed around the same time). Jointly funded by Laganside Corporation and the European Commission, the weir is intended to ensure that the level of the otherwise tidal river is maintained artificially constant. Another part of the project was the "Lagan Lookout" centre which explains the history and function of the weir as well as the history of the Lagan itself.
- Lanyon Place. This "flagship" development includes the Waterfront Hall, the Riverside Tower (headquarters of BT Northern Ireland) and a Hilton Hotel. The Lanyon Quay building was added later. The development is named after architect Charles Lanyon.
- Odyssey Complex. The Odyssey development was Northern Ireland's main "Millennium Project". A budget of £92 million was established; 49% funded by the Millennium Commission, 11% by the Laganside Corporation, 18.5% by the Department of Culture, Arts and Leisure, 18.5% by the Sheridan Group and 3.3% by the Sports Council. When completed in 2001, its facilities included a Vue cinema, an IMAX cinema (later closed), a 10,000-seat indoor arena which was home of the Belfast Giants ice-hockey team, the W5 ("Who when why what where") exhibition and several bars, clubs and restaurants.
- Gasworks. A redevelopment of the city's former gasworks, which closed in 1988, was undertaken by Belfast City Council and Laganside Corporation. The development retained several of the original gasworks buildings, including the "Klondyke Building" (now home to the Northern Ireland Environment Agency) and its restored clock tower. The area between Ormeau Road and the Lagan was cleared, and the site's large gas holders (once the largest in the world) were removed.
- Clarendon Dock. The first site to be completed, Clarendon Dock, has become a business park.
- Mays Meadow. This site, adjacent to Lanyon Place, is home to an Abbey call centre and the local headquarters of PricewaterhouseCoopers.
- Donegall Quay and The Quays. Donegall Quay is a road linking Oxford Street to Corporation Square. The quay itself is located north of the Lagan Weir, between it and the M3 bridge. In February 2005, Laganside announced the Obel Tower, Northern Ireland's tallest building.
