= Belvoir Park Forest =

Park in Belfast, Northern Ireland

Coordinates: 54.557°N 5.931°W

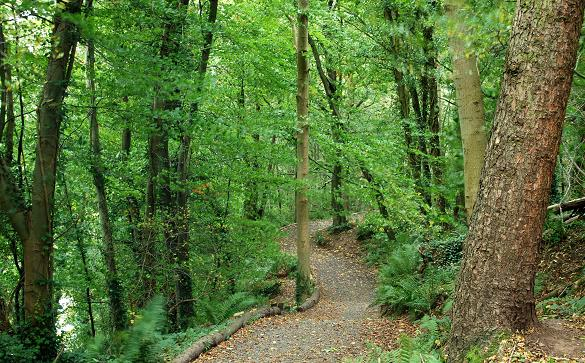
Belvoir Forest

Belvoir Park Forest is a large forest in Belfast, Northern Ireland. Owned and managed by Forest Service, it was opened in 1961 and covers 75 hectares along the bank of the River Lagan. As a working forest within a city, the park is unique in the UK. The park is notable as a place to see red squirrels.

== History ==
The forest is owned and managed by the Forest Service. It was opened in 1961 and covers 75 hectares along the bank of the River Lagan. As a working forest within a city, the park is unique in the UK. The Royal Society for the Protection of Birds have their Northern Ireland headquarters within the park. Archaeological sites within the forest include the remains of a 12th century Norman motte. The park was formerly part of the estate belonging to the Hills family, who enclosed it in the 1740s. The existing buildings on the site are farm buildings from the estate, the house having been demolished and replaced with the current car park. There is an ice house built into the motte which dates from the Hills period, and an arboretum with some of Belfast’s oldest and most unusual trees.

== Access ==
Cycling is not allowed in the forest.

== Wildlife ==
Wildlife recorded within the park boundaries includes Large Bracket Fungi, Toothwort (lathraea squamaria; L.), Giant Hog-weed (heracleum mantegazzianum; Somm. & Levier), long-eared owls, kingfishers, and long-tailed tits. Badgers and red foxes are also recorded. The forest includes some around one hundred "veteran" oaks, of up to 350 years of age.
