= Edenderry, County Down =

Village in County Down, Northern Ireland

Coordinates: 54.541°N 5.962°W

Edenderry: Irish: Éadan Doire
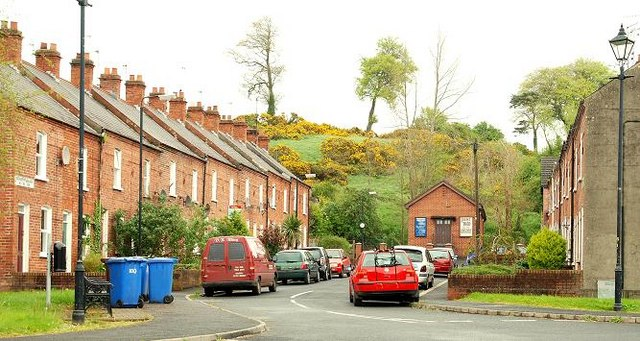
- Terraced houses in Edenderry

- Location within County Down
- Population: 374 (Census 2021)
- District: Lisburn
- County: County Down
- Country: Northern Ireland
- Sovereign state: United Kingdom
- Post town: BELFAST
- Postcode district: BT8
- Dialling code: 028
- UK Parliament: Lagan Valley
- NI Assembly: Lagan Valley

Edenderry (from Irish Éadan Doire, meaning 'hill-brow of the oak-grove') is a small village and townland in County Down, Northern Ireland. It lies on the bank of the River Lagan near the southern edge of Belfast. In the 2021 census it had a population of 374. Its main source of employment for its people is work in nearby towns and cities, such as Belfast.

Edenderry was built between 1866 and 1911 by John Shaw Brown, a local linen manufacturer. An early example of a planned community during the Industrial Revolution, it is now a conservation area, retaining the historic character of the Victorian era.

== Industrial Origins ==
In the early 19th century, Belfast experienced significant industrial growth, leading to a shift in textile production from independent weavers to factory-based employment. By the 1830s, Edenderry was home to several hundred linen and cotton weavers, many of whom worked for Belfast manufacturers. Women in the area also contributed through hand spinning and embroidery.

A bleach green operated in Edenderry as early as 1780, owned by John Russell. A bleach green was an open grassy area used in the linen industry where fabric was laid out and exposed to sunlight and water to naturally whiten it, a common practice before chemical bleaching became widespread. By the 1830s, the Russell family had converted their bleaching operations into a flour mill powered by the River Lagan. At that time, Edenderry was sparsely populated, with only a small number of stone-built houses and families engaged in agriculture or trade.

== Development of the St. Ellen Works ==
In 1866, linen manufacturer John Shaw Brown acquired the flour mill and repurposed it into a weaving factory known as the St. Ellen Works. The site eventually housed 500 damask looms and employed over 400 workers at its peak. The factory produced both plain and damask linen, including the internationally distributed "Shamrock" linens.

The factory complex included worker housing, a dining hall, and a shop. The surrounding village was developed on higher ground above the factory, forming a cul-de-sac bordered by mature trees and pastureland. Infrastructure maintenance, such as road repairs, was managed by the factory’s administration.

== Religious and Cultural Features ==
Edenderry’s religious life was centred around Drumbo Parish Church, which practiced an unusual 18th-century burial custom requiring a person of good standing to vouch for the deceased. Nearby, Drumbo Presbyterian Church features a tower dating back to 1082. The area also offered recreational access to the Giant’s Ring via the Gilchrist footbridge, named after the first chairman of the Lagan Valley Regional Park.

Before the construction of the Lagan Weir, the River Lagan was navigable to Edenderry, allowing boat travel to and from Belfast.

== Decline and Redevelopment ==
By the late 1970s and early 1980s, the linen industry in Edenderry faced economic challenges due to increased competition from imports. The factory was divided into units and leased out, and improvement grants were secured to renovate the mill houses. These efforts helped preserve the village’s historical character.

Today, Edenderry is a residential area that retains many features of its 19th-century mill village origins. Conservation efforts have maintained its architectural and cultural heritage.
