= Queensbridge =

Queensbridge may refer to:

- One Queensbridge, an approved supertall skyscraper in Melbourne, Australia
- Queensbridge Houses, a public housing development in Queens, New York, United States
  - 21st Street–Queensbridge station, a subway station within the housing development
- Queensbridge School, a school in Moseley, England
- Queensbridge (ward), a former electoral ward in Hackney, London, England

== See also ==
- Queen's Bridge (disambiguation)
