= Waterfront Hall =

Conference and entertainment centre in Belfast, Northern Ireland

Belfast Waterfront
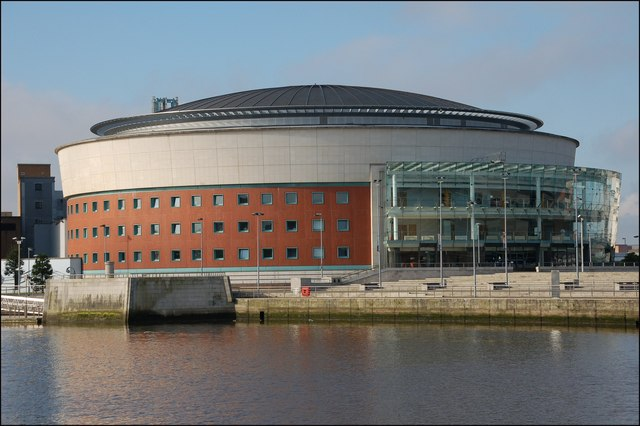
- The Waterfront Hall faces the River Lagan
- Interactive map of Belfast Waterfront
- Location: Belfast, Northern Ireland
- Coordinates: 54°35′51″N 5°55′13″W
- Capacity: Studio: 330; Auditorium: 2,250

Construction
- Groundbreaking: 1995
- Opened: 1997
- Renovated: May 2016

Website
- www.waterfront.co.uk

Belfast Waterfront is a multi-purpose conference and entertainment centre in Belfast, Northern Ireland. The hall is located in Lanyon Place, the flagship development of the Laganside Corporation. The development is named after the architect Charles Lanyon.

== Construction ==
Planning for the building began 1989, with the hall being completed in 1997 at a cost of £32 million. It was designed by the local architecture firm Robinson McIlwaine. The main circular auditorium seats 2,241 and is based on the Berlin Philharmonic Hall designed by Hans Scharoun. However the flexible design of the auditorium allows the stalls seating to be moved to create a larger arena. The smaller adjoining studio seats 380. The dome of the building is coated in copper. This is so the exterior will eventually turn green and reflect the dome of Belfast City Hall and other Victorian buildings in Belfast City Centre. The building also contains bars and a restaurant.

== Notable events ==
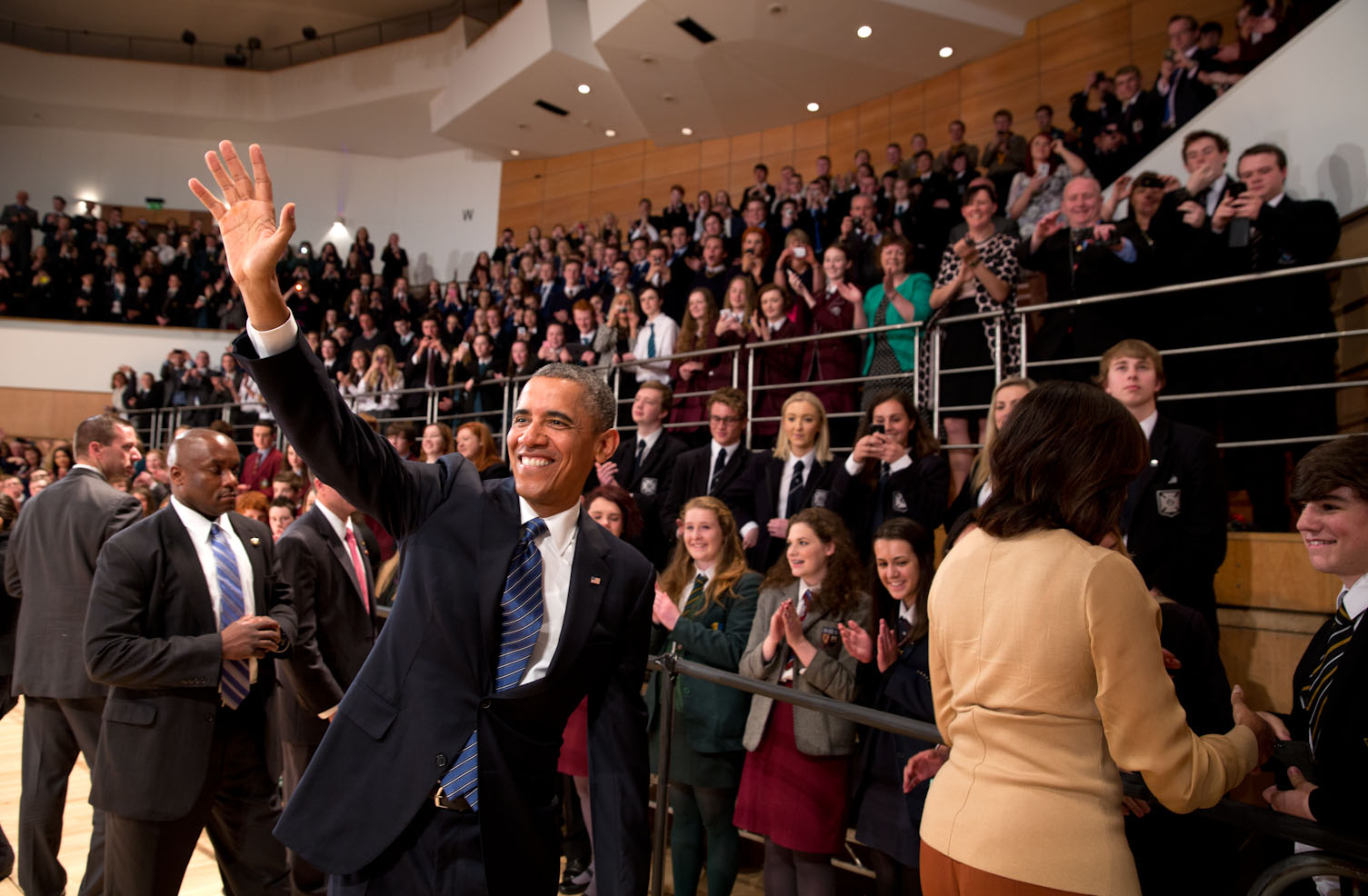
Barack Obama and his wife Michelle at the Waterfront, 2013

In addition to hosting plays in the Waterfront Hall's 350-seat studio, the venue's hall has been used for events in the Belfast Festival at Queen's and for concerts given by the Ulster Orchestra.

In May 1998, David Trimble and John Hume appeared together onstage, alongside U2, to promote a "yes" vote in the 1998 Northern Ireland Good Friday Agreement referendum.

During their 2002 tour, in promotion of their album Right Now, the pop trio Atomic Kitten recorded their Right Here, Right Now DVD at the auditorium.

Planxty performed there on 19, 20 and 21 January 2005 as part of their series of reunion concerts.

In 2011, the Waterfront hosted the Sinn Féin Ardfheis, the first time for it to be held in Belfast.

In June 2013, Barack Obama gave a speech at the venue, ahead of the 39th G8 summit in County Fermanagh.

On 18 January 2014, Britain's Got Talent auditions were in here. The auditions were for the Series 8 of the show. The auditions were broadcast in April 2014.

The 2018 BBC Radio 2 Folk Awards were held at the venue in April 2018. It was the first time the awards took place in Belfast.

The annual snooker tournament, the Northern Ireland Open has been held at the venue since its second year in 2017.

== See also ==
- List of concert halls
