= Queen Elizabeth Bridge, Belfast =

Coordinates: 54°36′0.86″N 5°55′13.78″W

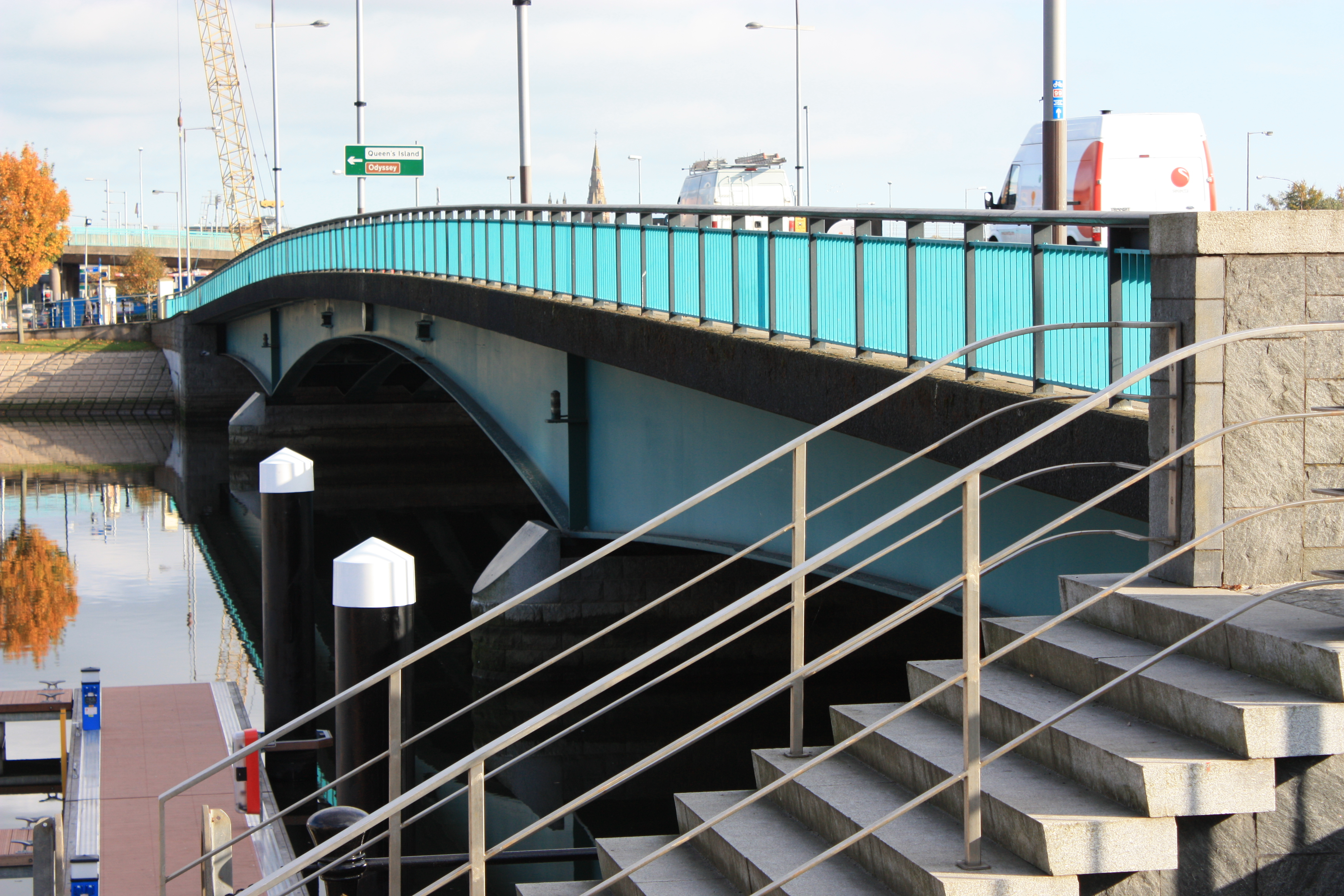
Queen Elizabeth bridge, October 2009

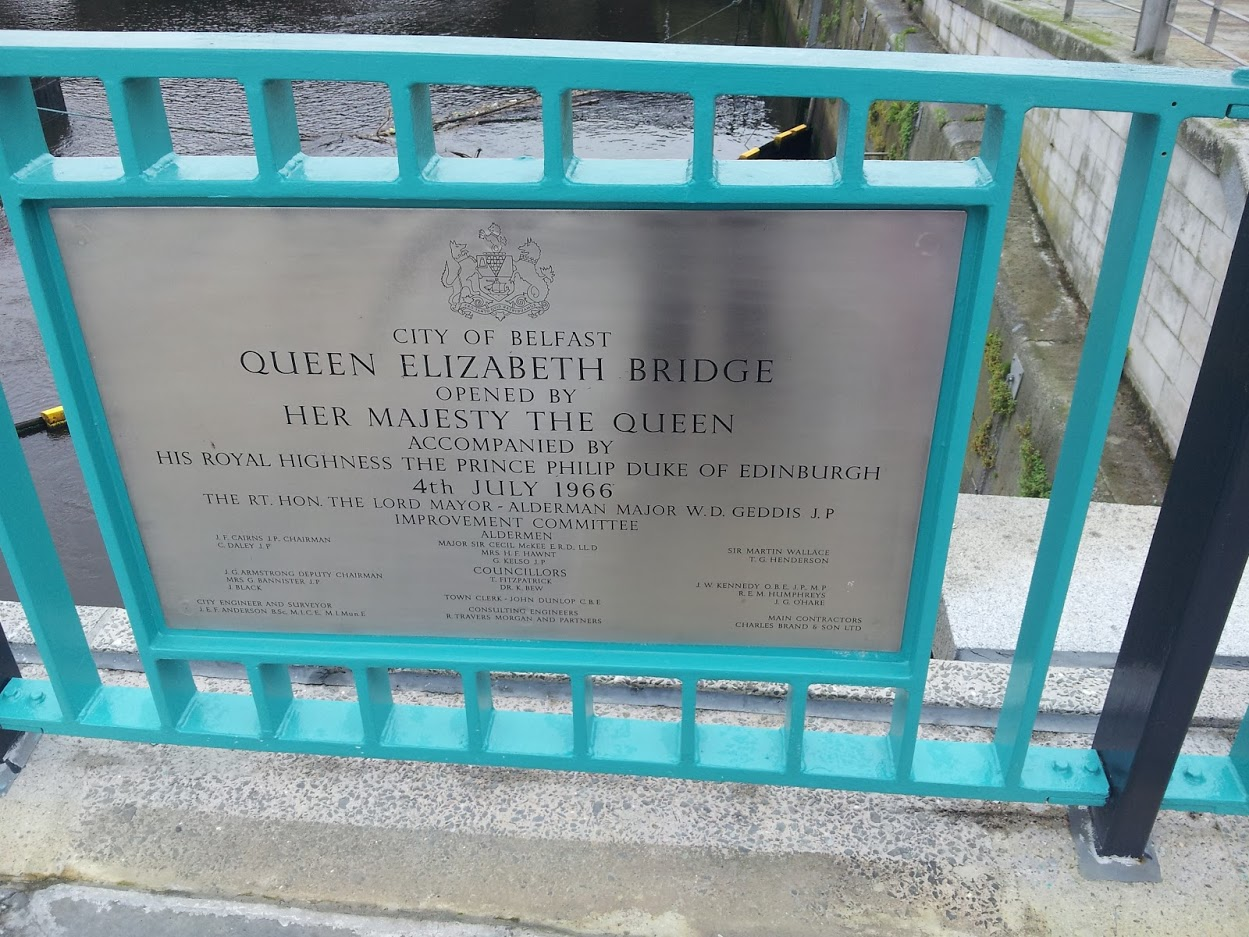
Queen Elizabeth Bridge plaque

Queen Elizabeth Bridge is a bridge over the River Lagan in Belfast, Northern Ireland, which opened in 1966.

Next bridge upstream	River Lagan	Next bridge downstream
Queen's Bridge	Queen Elizabeth Bridge	Lagan Weir

== History ==
The concept of a new bridge over the Lagan was first officially discussed in August 1959 within the Belfast Corporation Improvement Committee, with the purpose of it being to alleviate the traffic bottlenecks at the current city centre bridges. It was decided that the bridge would be placed beside Queen's Bridge to avoid river flow turbulences, which may have affected the existing bridge's foundations. A tunnel was also considered but was rejected for cost reasons. Over the next few years, the proposals were expanded into a larger programme of works, known as the "Lagan bridge scheme", which also included a large gyratory and one-way system to connect the bridges to the Sydenham Bypass (necessitating the demolition of 145 houses at Bridge End), two flyovers and seven pedestrian subways.

In March 1963, the total cost of the scheme was estimated at £3 million, however by the time of completion this had risen to £4 million. In August, the construction contract was awarded to Charles Brand and Son Ltd for £3,749,213 1s. 5d. Soon construction began with the first pile driven in October. The demolitions at Bridge End were completed in January 1965 and by December of the same year, most of the roadworks were nearing completion.

The decision on the name of the bridge in February 1966 proved controversial. The Unionist Party group in Belfast Corporation initially voted by 20 votes to 18 for the name Carson Bridge, after the former leader of their party, with the alternative being Somme Bridge. However, the governor of Northern Ireland, Lord Erskine, intervened to ensure that a more politically neutral name was chosen, which caused unionists to criticise him for "interfering" in the affairs of Northern Ireland. A new name, Queen Elizabeth Bridge, was then chosen and was supported by both unionists and nationalists. Sir Cecil McKee took credit for the name, although it had earlier been reported that it was believed to be the Governor's idea.

The bridge opened to traffic, along with the other elements of the scheme, on Sunday, 3 April 1966. It was then officially opened by the Queen and Duke of Edinburgh on 4 July; however, their visit was marred by both a concrete block being dropped on their car from a height and a bottle being thrown at it as they made their way through the city centre.

== See also ==
- List of bridges over the River Lagan
