= Queen's Bridge, Belfast =

Bridge in Belfast

Coordinates: 54°35′58.8″N 5°55′13.93″W

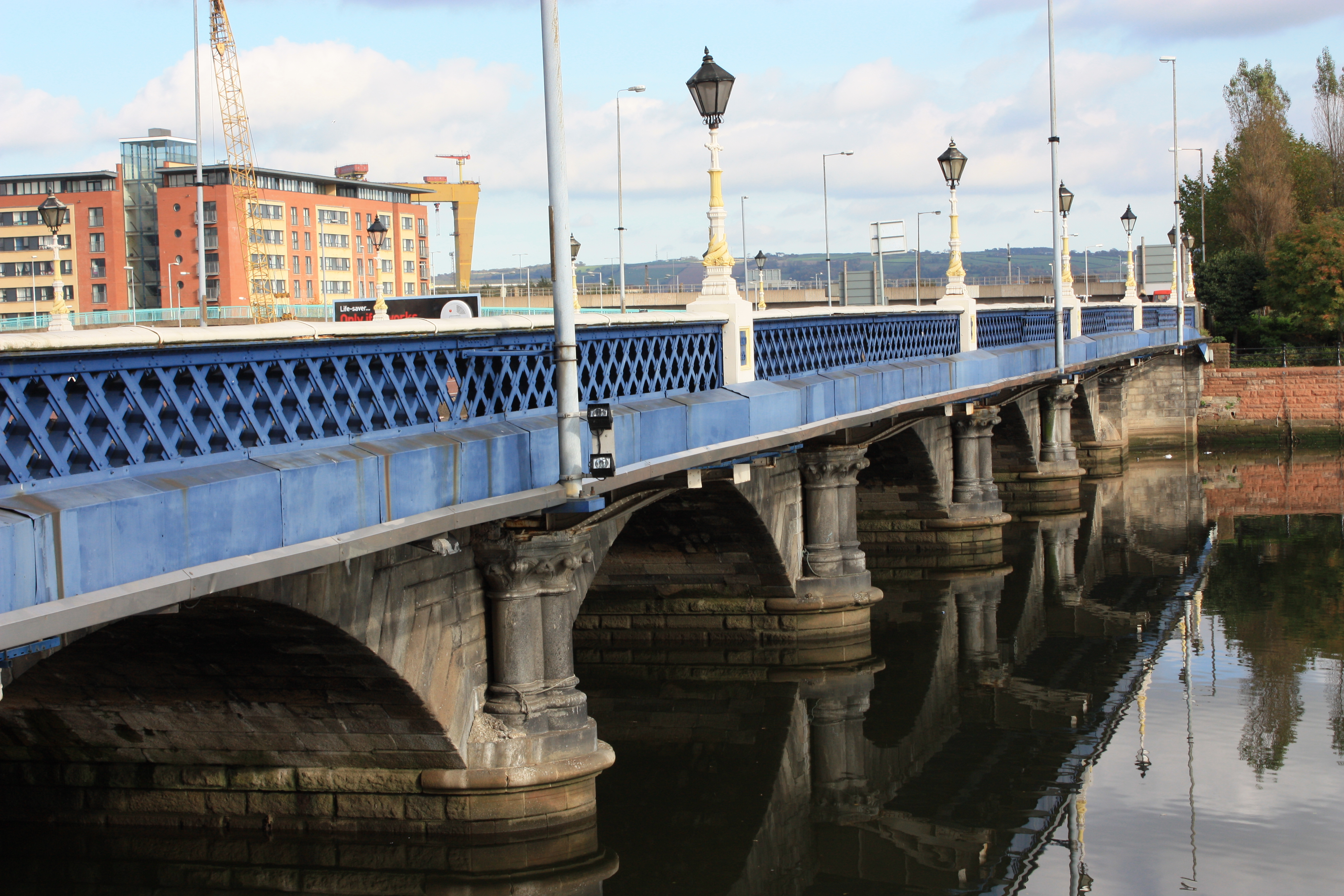
The Queens Bridge, October 2009

Queen's Bridge is a B+ listed Victorian stone arch bridge in Belfast, Northern Ireland. It opened to traffic in 1843 and is named after Queen Victoria.

Next bridge upstream	River Lagan	Next bridge downstream
Lagan Railway Bridge	Queen's Bridge	Queen Elizabeth Bridge

== Long Bridge ==
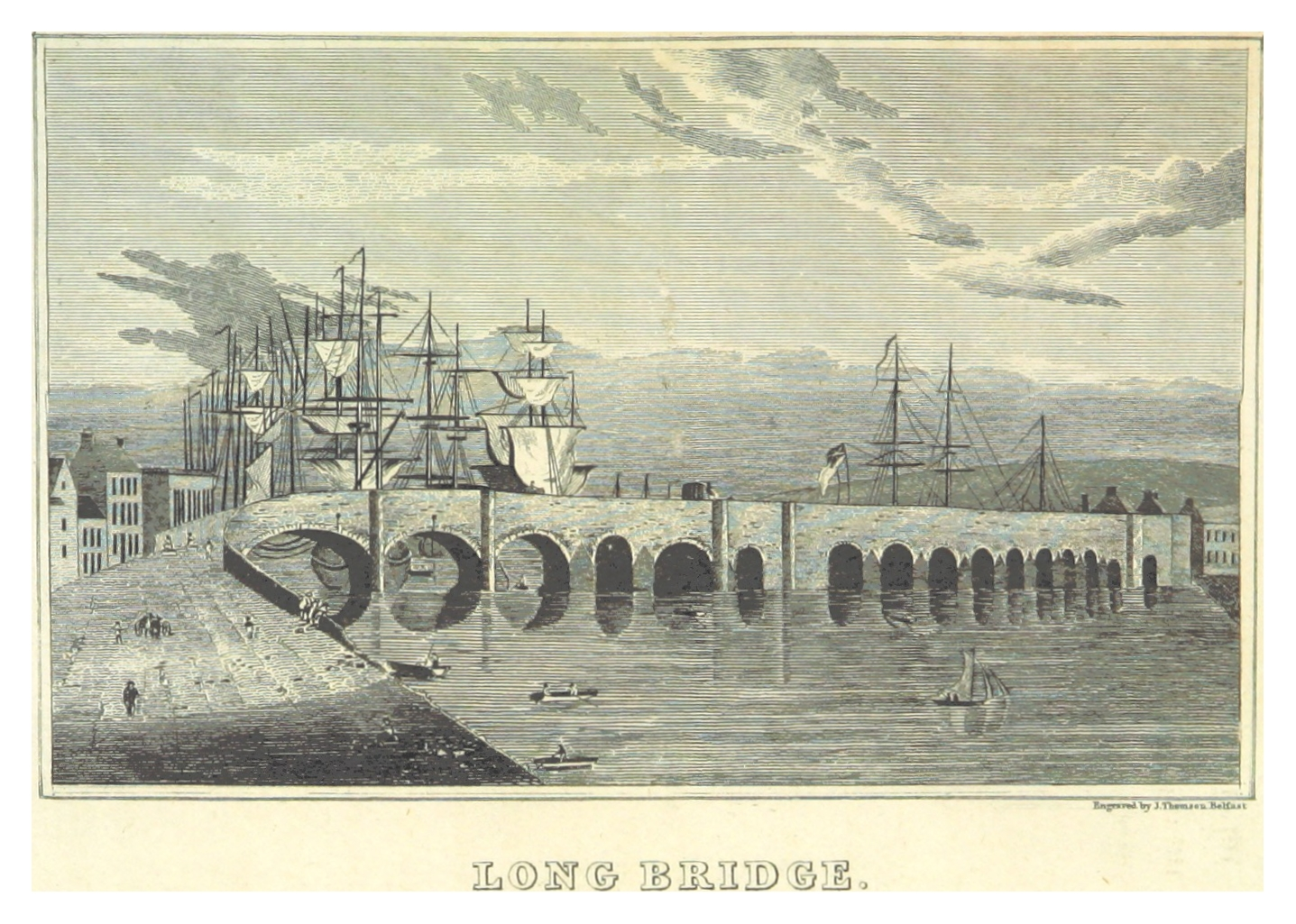
A drawing of the Long Bridge published in 1823

The previous bridge on this site was the Long Bridge, which began construction in 1682, supposedly on the site of an ancient ford. It had 21 arches, with a total span length of 840 feet (260 m) and a width of 20 feet (6.1 m), although its long approach from the east made it almost a mile long. The bridge was rebuilt several times over the years, such as in 1692 when seven arches collapsed when it was rammed by a ship (possibly because it had been weakened in 1689 when the Duke of Schomberg's troops transported their cannons over it). By 1830, traffic volumes were increasing and a wider bridge was required, so the intention to build a new bridge was announced. The Long Bridge was not demolished until work on the new bridge began and it is shown on the 1833 Ordnance Survey map.

A piece of granite from the Long Bridge is embedded in the pavement at the junction of Castreagh Street and the Albertbridge Road in East Belfast.

== Construction ==
The contract for the construction of the new bridge was given by the Board of Works to Francis Ritchie & Son, with a tendered price of £27,000. The bridge was designed by Thomas Jackson and John Fraser, in their respective roles as county surveyors of Antrim and Down (the river is the county boundary). However, in 1836, Jackson was replaced as Antrim county surveyor by Charles Lanyon who supervised the construction with Fraser. By March 1841, preparations were being made for the foundations of the bridge; however, it had not yet been decided whether the bridge would have a higher central arch, to reduce the overall approach gradient, or if it would have a horizontal deck. By July 1842, one of the arches had been keyed in, with the horizontal deck design having been chosen. The bridge opened in January 1843, within budget but slightly late. In 1849, it was named the Queen's Bridge in honour of Queen Victoria's visit to Belfast, during which she officially opened the structure.

== Structure ==
The bridge is a five-arch stone bridge, with each arch having a width of 50 feet (15 m) and a rise of 10 feet (3.0 m). The arches are dressed with Newry granite. The bridge deck originally had a width of 30 feet (9.1 m). This was widened in 1885 to 62 feet (19 m) by the addition of cantilevered segments on either side. 16 ornate gas lamps (now electric) were also added. They carry their maker's name ("Gregg, Sons & Phenix/ Iron Founders/ Belfast") and Belfast Corporation's coat of arms on their pedestals.

== See also ==
- List of bridges over the River Lagan
