= Drumbeg, County Down =

Village in County Down, Northern Ireland

Coordinates: 54°32′3″N 5°59′7″W

Drumbeg: Irish: An Droim Beag
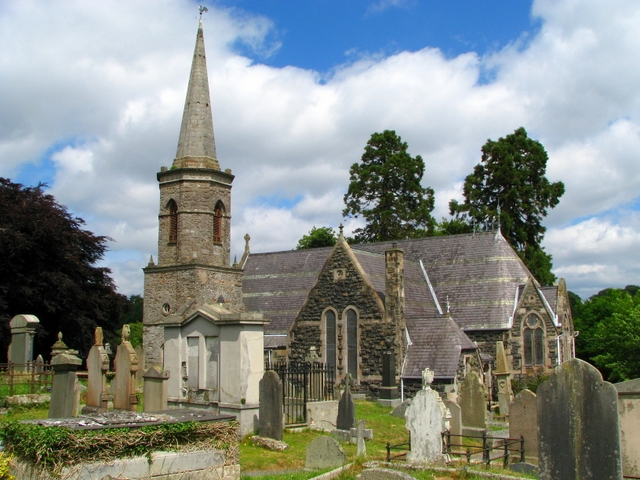
- St Patricks Church, Drumbeg
- Population: 770 (2021 Census)
- County: County Down
- Country: Northern Ireland
- Sovereign state: United Kingdom
- Post town: BELFAST
- Postcode district: BT17
- Dialling code: 028

Drumbeg (from Irish An Droim Beag 'the little ridge') is the name of a small village, of a townland (of 376 acres) and of a civil parish on the south bank of the River Lagan in County Down, Northern Ireland. The village is covered by the Lisburn City Council area and forms part of the suburban fringe of Belfast.

== 2001 Census ==
Drumbeg is classified as a small village or hamlet by the NI Statistics and Research Agency (NISRA) (i.e. with population between 500 and 1,000). On Census day (29 April 2001) there were 727 people living in Drumbeg. Of these:

- 18.4% were aged under 16 years and 23.8% were aged 60 and over
- 45.3% of the population were male and 54.8% were female
- 12.7% were from a Catholic background and 83.2% were from a Protestant background
- 0.9% of people aged 16–74 were unemployed

For more details see: NI Neighbourhood Information Service

== Civil parish of Drumbeg ==
The civil parish covers areas in the historic baronies of Castlereagh Upper in County Down and Belfast Upper in County Antrim. It also contains the urban area of Dunmurry.

=== Townlands ===
The civil parish contains the following townlands:

- Ballyaghlis
- Ballyfinaghy
- Ballygowan
- Drumbeg
- Dunmurry
- Hillhall
- Oldforge

== See also ==
- List of civil parishes of County Down
- List of townlands in County Down
- Neill, M. (1995?) Ecclesia De Drum Recollections of the Parish of Drumbeg Diocese of Down. The University Press
- Costeclade, C. and Walker, B. (Consultant editors)2013. The Church of Ireland. ISBN 978-1-906886-56-1
