= Lagan Weir =

Weir in Belfast, Northern Ireland

Coordinates: 54.60086°N 5.92000°W

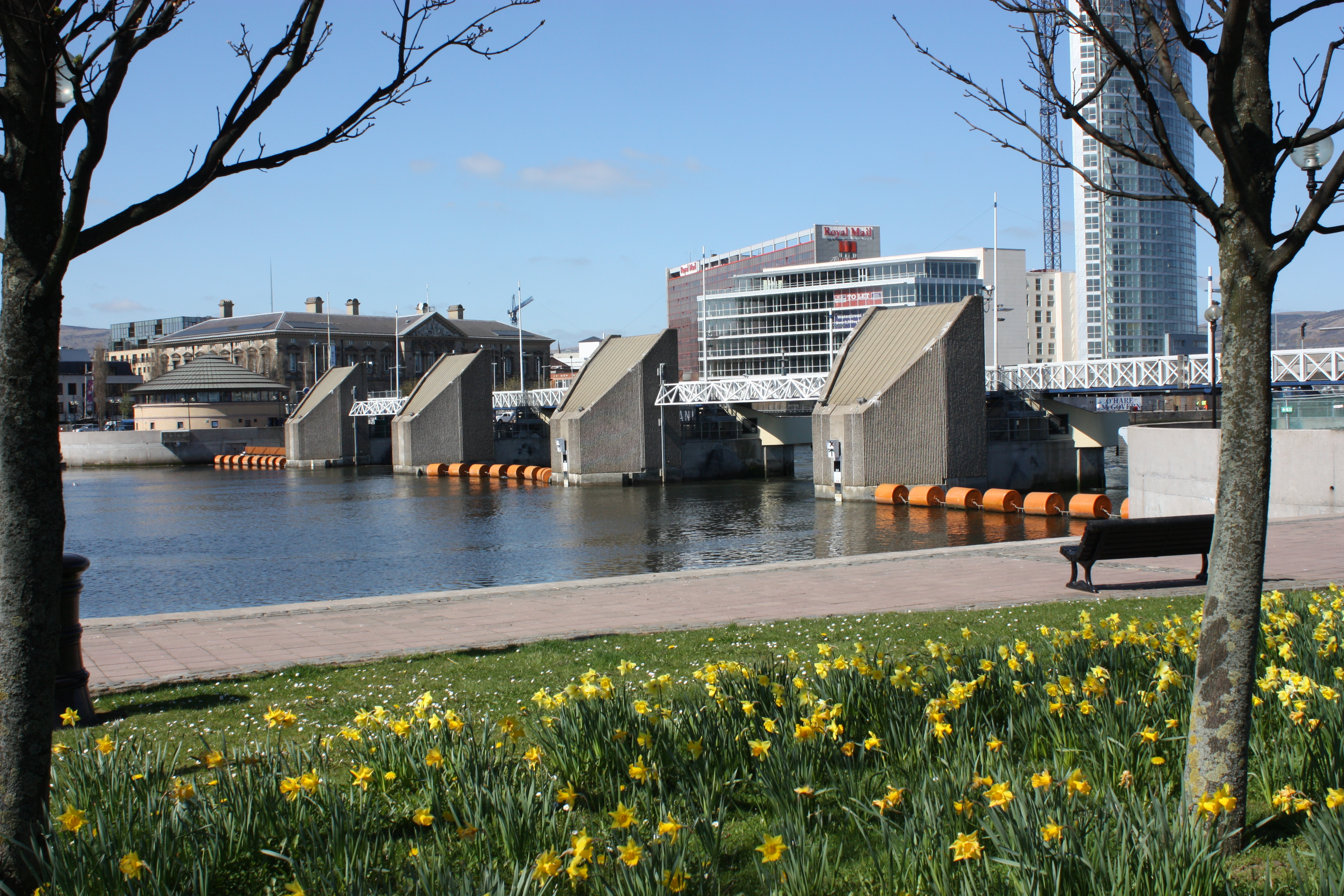
Lagan Weir, viewed from Queen's Quay, April 2010

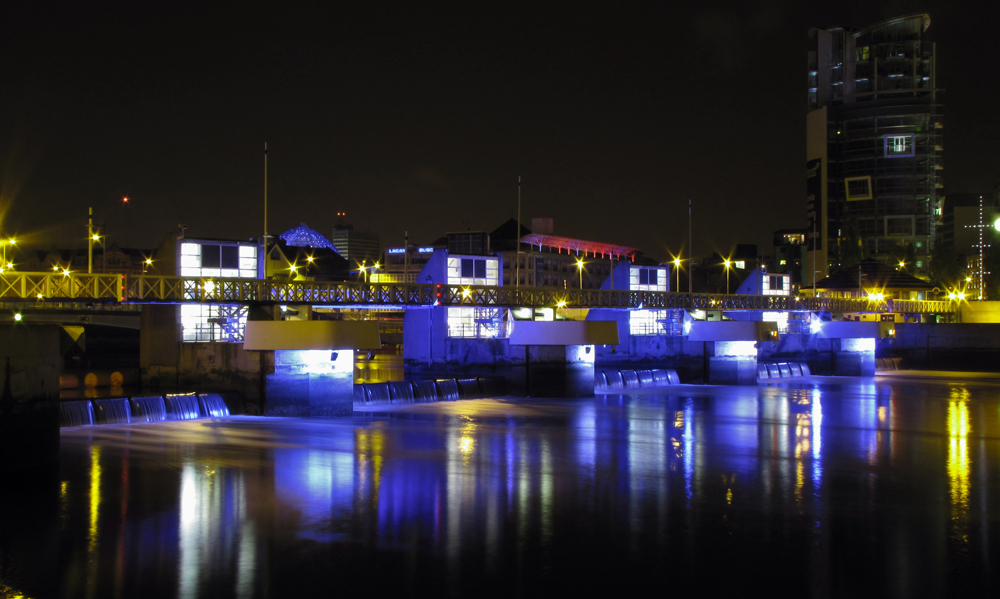
Lagan Weir at night, September 2011

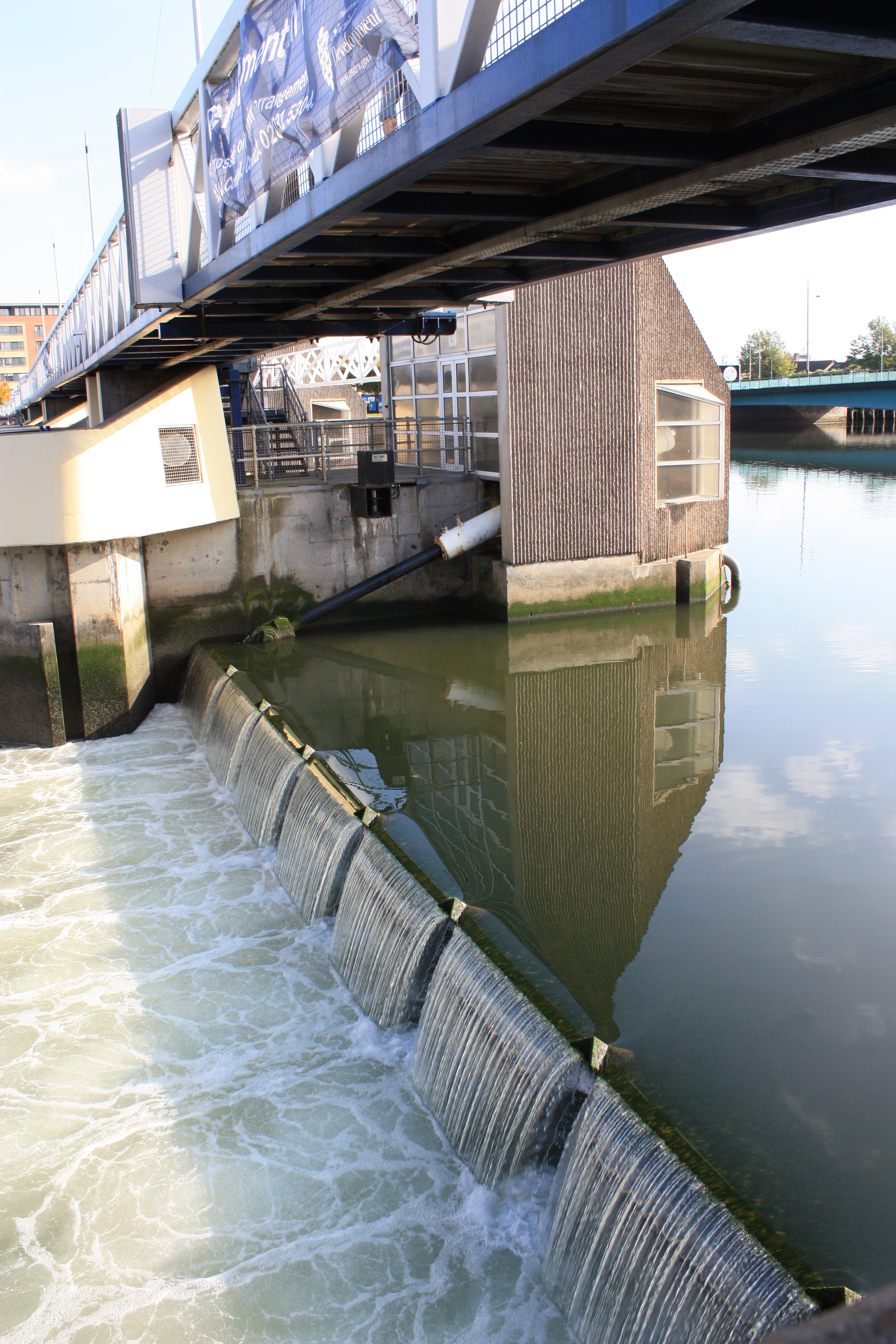
Lagan Weir, October 2009

The Lagan Weir, in Belfast, Northern Ireland, crosses the River Lagan between the Queen Elizabeth Bridge and the M3 cross-harbour bridge. Prior to the building of the weir, the river would be subject to tidal fluctuations, and low tide would expose mudflats, which were unsightly and emitted a strong odour, particularly in the summer months. Opened in 1994, the weir was seen by the Laganside Corporation as a catalyst for its redevelopment projects and was judged to be the "centrepiece" of that effort. The weir also incorporates a footbridge.

== Construction ==
The Lagan Weir, completed in 1994, is located in Belfast, Northern Ireland and crosses the River Lagan between the Queen Elizabeth Bridge and the M3 cross-harbour bridge. The £14m project was jointly funded by the Laganside Corporation and the European Commission. It was designed by Ferguson and McIlveen and constructed by Charles Brand Ltd.

Planning for the weir commenced as early as 1988. The Prince of Wales was involved in the ceremonial setting of the first pile for the weir on 7 March 1991. The floating crane Mersey Mammoth lifted the five 32 tonne weir gates into position in May 1992. The weir gates measure 18 metres by 5 metres and were manufactured by Harland & Wolff. The Weir was officially opened in March 1994.

The project included the "Lagan Lookout" on the Donegall Quay side of the river. This houses a visitors centre which has an exhibition to provide information on the function of the weir and the history of the River Lagan. The weir gate control centre, security, CCTV system and welfare facilities for River Management personnel are located on the ground floor. Equipment storage is located in the basement.

The Lagan Weir consists of five weir gates and four intermediate gatehouses. A tunnel traverses under the River Lagan, which connects to both quaysides and to each of the gatehouses. Primarily, this provides access to the gatehouses for maintaining the weir gate motors.

== Weir operations ==
The five weir gates can each be operated independently. They are usually raised as the tide retreats in order to keep the river at a specific impoundment level. The gate operations are controlled by the River Manager. Without the weir, the river would be subject to tidal fluctuations. The tidal range is typically up to three metres between high and low tide, but the maximum tidal range can be as much as four metres. Prior to the building of the weir, low tide would expose mudflats, which were unsightly and emitted a strong odour, particularly in the summer months. On occasion, at high tide, the weir can operate as a barrage. If the river level is too high this can have such negative effects as causing erosion of the river banks, reduce air draft for vessels needing to pass under any of the river's road bridges and in extreme cases, increase the risk of flooding to low areas.

== Benefits ==
Construction of the weir, installation of an underwater aeration system and maintenance dredging has led to environmental improvements in terms of water quality and biodiversity. Dredging was carried out at the same time as the construction of the weir. Subsequent dredging was completed in 2010/2011 and 2019/2020. Development along the riverside has included construction of new residential towers, commercial and retail blocks, restaurants, and improved public towpaths.

== Footbridge ==
A pedestrian footbridge was constructed over the weir and connects Donegall Quay with Queen's Quay. The original bridge, which was narrow and required spiral access ramps at either end, was located above the weir gates and supported by the weir gatehouse structures. This was removed in 2014 to allow the construction a new structure, which provides access for both cyclists and pedestrians. The new bridge was erected by Graham Construction at a cost of £5m and is approximately 8 meters wide at its widest point.

Next crossing upstream	River Lagan	Next crossing downstream
Queen Elizabeth Bridge	Lagan Weir	Dargan Bridge
