= River Lagan =

River in Northern Ireland

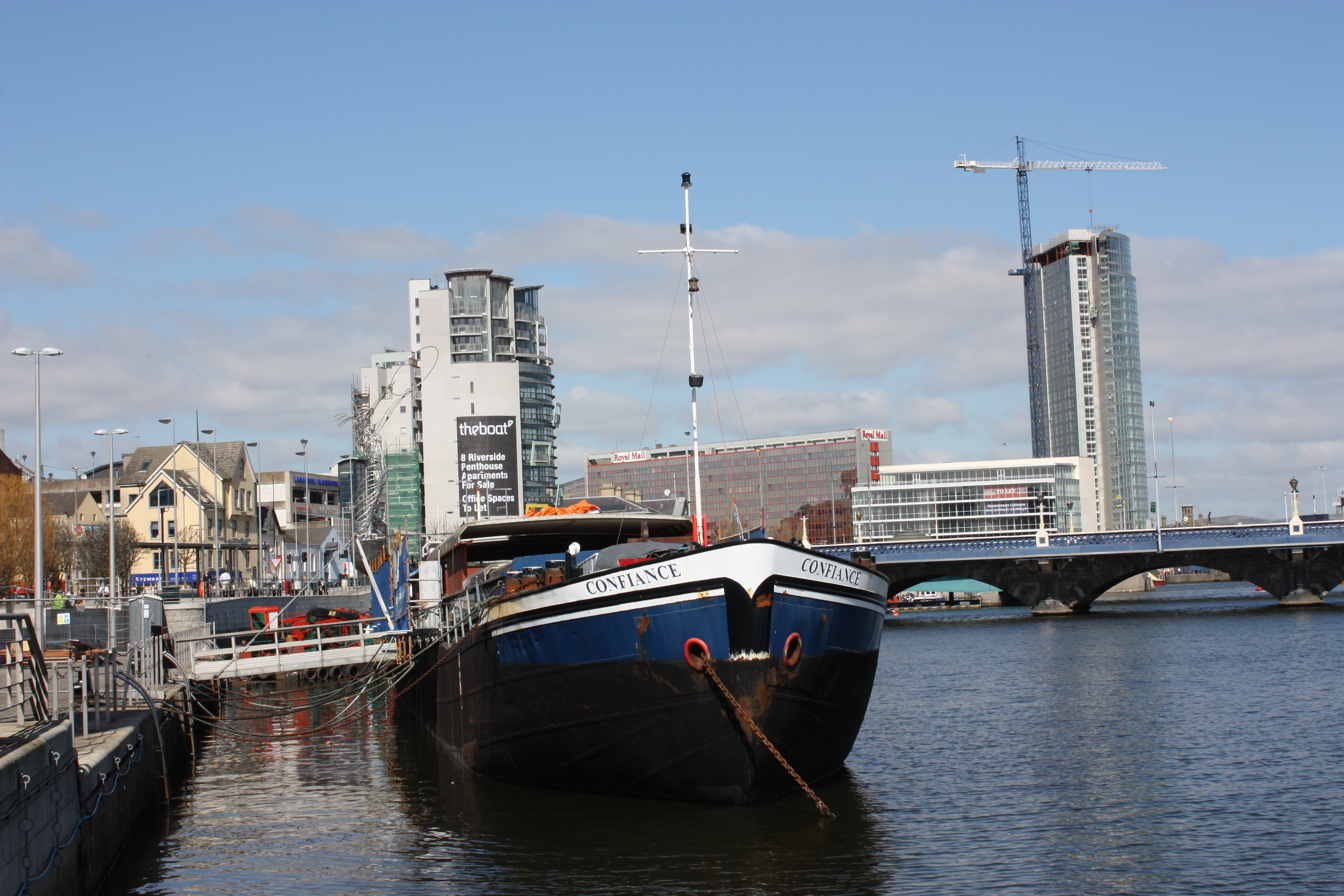
- River Lagan at Lanyon Place, Belfast

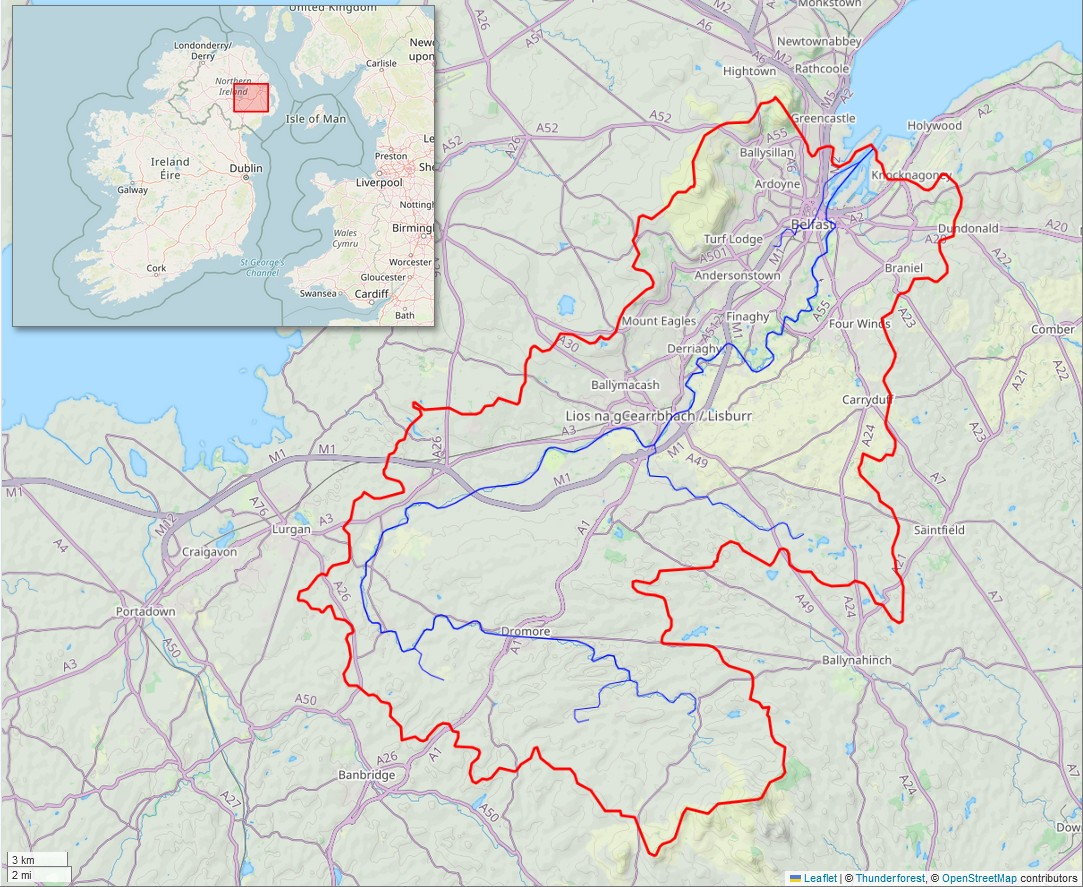
- Map of the Lagan River drainage basin
- Native name: Abhainn an Lagáin (Irish)

Location
- Sovereign State: United Kingdom
- Constituent Country: Northern Ireland
- Counties: Antrim, Down

Physical characteristics
- Source: Slieve Croob
  - location: Northern Ireland
  - coordinates: 54.340°N 5.973°W
  - elevation: 119 m (390 ft)
- Mouth: Belfast Lough
  - coordinates: 54.691°N 5.785°W
- Length: 86 km (53 mi)
- Basin size: 609 km^{2} (235 sq mi)

Basin features
- Tributaries
  - left: River Farset, Blackstaff River
  - right: Carryduff River, Ravernet River

The River Lagan (from Irish Abhainn an Lagáin 'river of the low-lying district'; Ulster Scots: Lagan Wattèr) is a major river in Northern Ireland which runs 53.5 mi (86.1 km) from the Slieve Croob mountain in County Down to Belfast where it enters Belfast Lough, an inlet of the Irish Sea. The Lagan forms much of the border between County Antrim and County Down in the east of Ulster. It rises as a stream near to the summit of Slieve Croob. It runs to Belfast through Dromara, Donaghcloney and Dromore. On the lower slopes of the mountain, it combines with a branch from Legananny Mountain, just opposite Slieve Croob. The river then turns east to Magheralin into a broad plain between the plateaus of Antrim and Down.

The river drains approximately 609 square km of agricultural land and flows to the Stranmillis Weir, from which point on it is estuarine. The catchment consists mainly of enriched agricultural grassland in the upper parts, with the lower section draining urban Belfast and Lisburn. There is one significant tributary, the Ravernet River, and there are several minor tributaries, including the Carryduff River, the River Farset and the Blackstaff River. Work is proceeding to restore a self-sustaining population of Atlantic salmon to the river.

== History ==
Ptolemy's Geography (2nd century AD) described a river called Λογια (Logia). The river name is thought to connect with Old Irish loeg ("calf") and with *laks ("salmon").

== The Lagan in Belfast ==
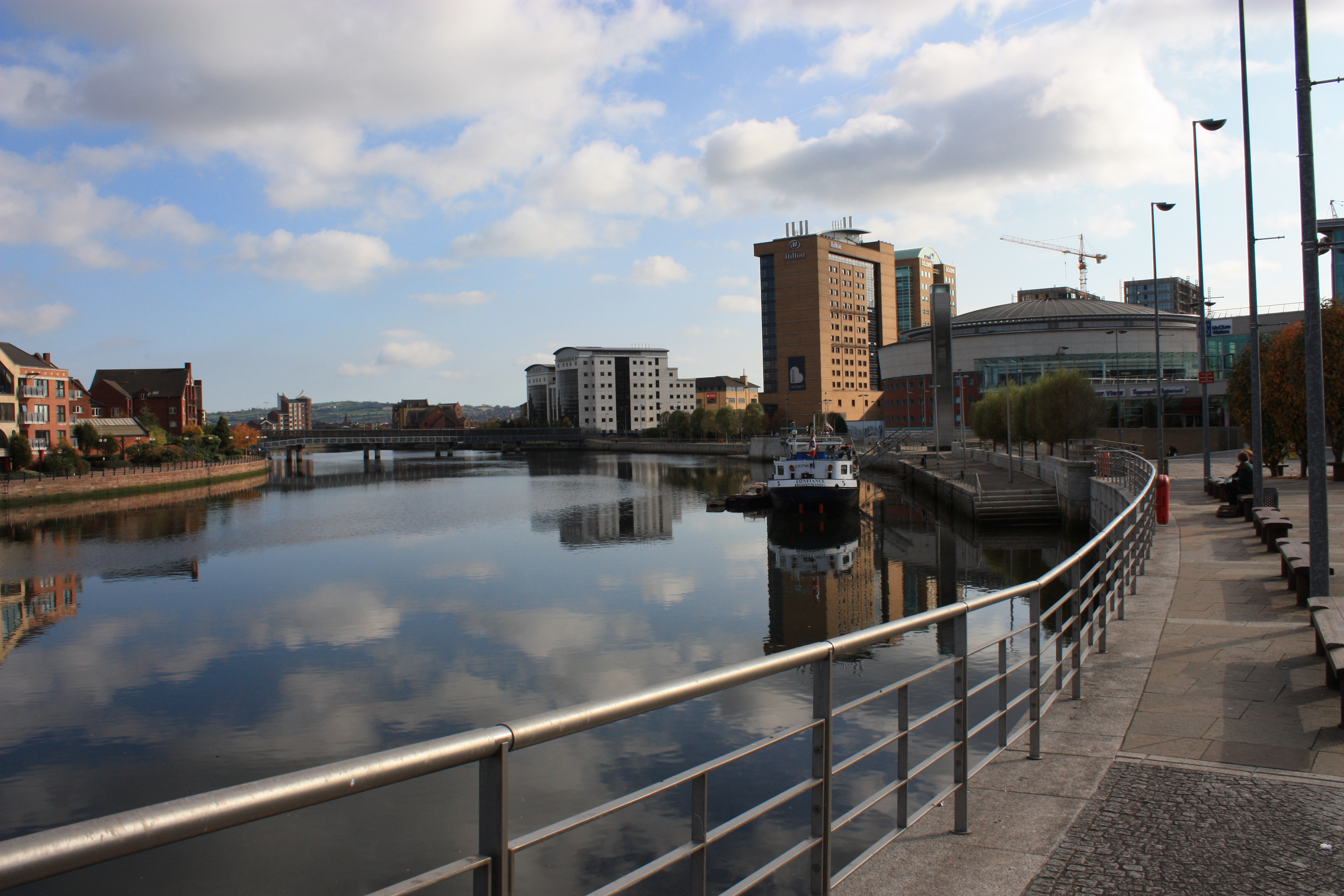
River Lagan and the Waterfront Hall, Belfast, October 2009

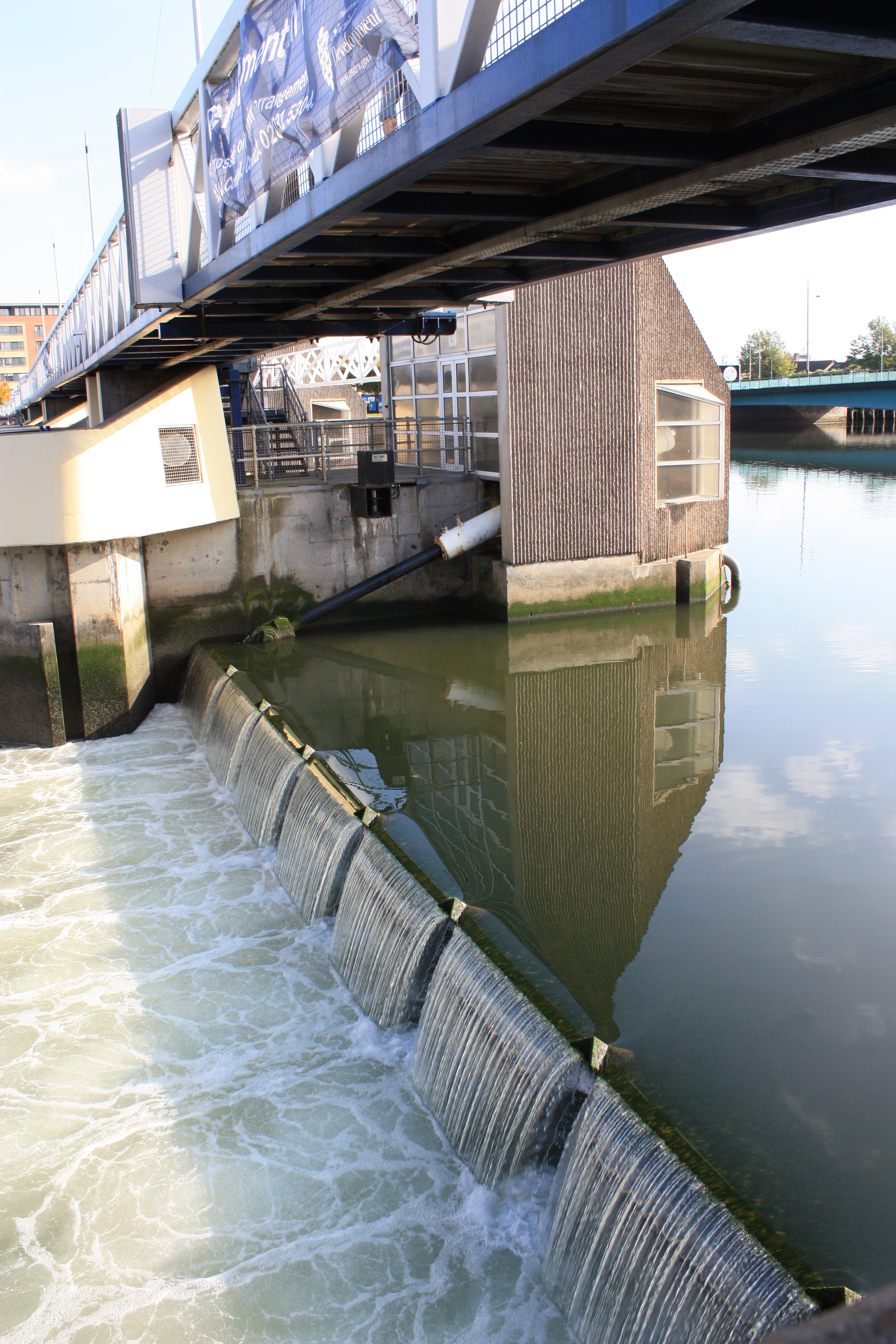
Lagan Weir, Belfast, October 2009

The name Belfast originates from the Irish Béal Feirste, or the mouth of the Farset, the river on which the city was built and which flows into the Lagan. The Farset has been superseded by the River Lagan as the most important river. A section of the Farset is covered over by the city's High Street.

=== Laganside Corporation ===
In 1989 the Laganside Corporation was established by the British government to redevelop the areas surrounding the Lagan in Belfast. Major developments of the Laganside Corporation along the river include the regeneration of the city's former Gasworks, and the Lanyon Place development, which includes the Waterfront Hall.

One of the earliest and most important undertakings of the corporation was the Lagan Weir. Completed in 1994 at a cost of £14 million (equivalent to £28.15 million in 2024), the weir controls the level of water upstream. One of the main functions of the weir was to reduce unsightly mud flats at low tide. This was mostly successful, but mud flats are still evident on the river. The weir is a series of large steel barriers which are raised as the tide retreats to keep the river at an artificially constant level. Dredging and aeration have increased water quality in the river.

=== Sport ===
The river is used by a number of rowing clubs, including Queen's University Boat Club, Queen's Ladies Boat Club, Methodist College Boat Club, Royal Belfast Academical Institution (RBAI) Rowing Club, Belfast Rowing Club (BRC) and Lagan Scullers Club. The Boathouses are all based between the Governors Bridge and the Stranmillis Weir.

== The Lagan in Lisburn ==
Lisburn City Council built the Lagan Valley Island complex; a new headquarters for the council and an Arts Centre, wedding and conference facilities and a restaurant. Opened in 2001, the building is surrounded by the Lagan on one side and a channel linked to the river on the other.

== The Lagan Navigation ==
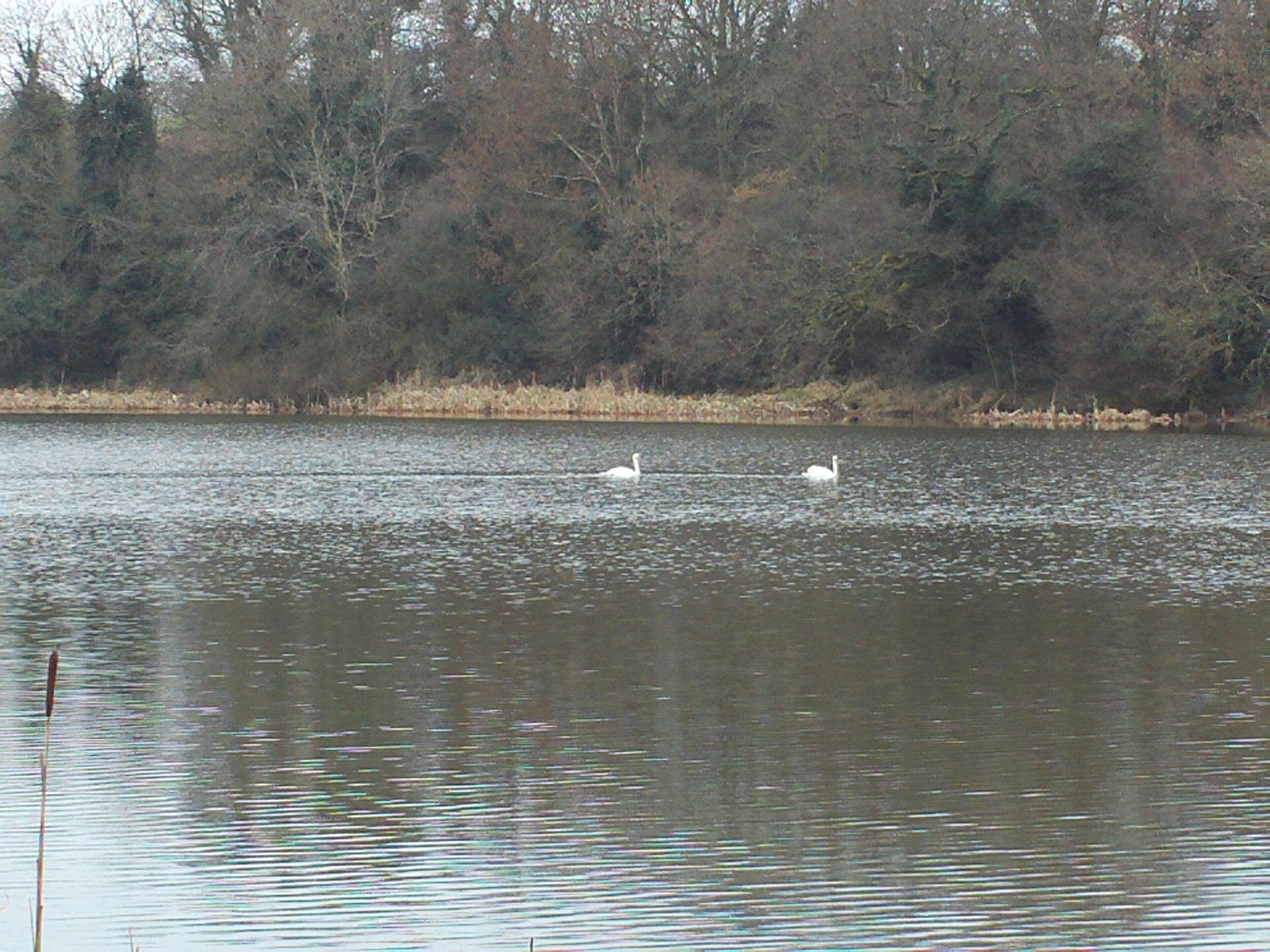
The old Lagan Navigational Canal (disused) at Broadwater, near Aghalee. (The disused canal was part of the River Lagan, until being closed in the 1950s. This gives the canal its name.)

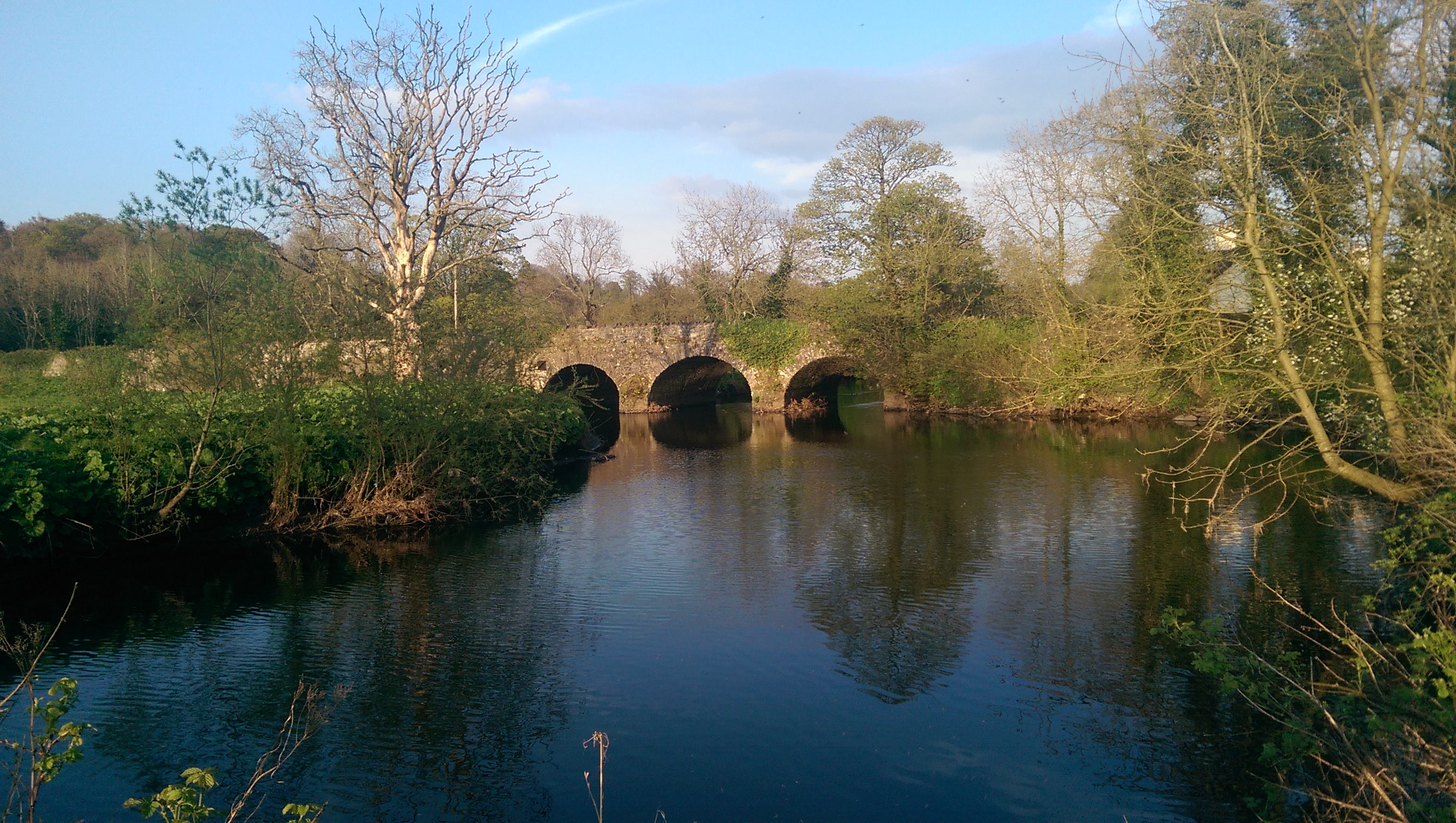
The Lagan at Drumbeg.

In the late 19th century the Lagan Canal was built from Lough Neagh to Belfast, using some of the river as a navigable waterway and diverting water from other areas to supply separate canal sections. However, by the mid-20th century the route had fallen into disuse and was largely derelict. The M1 motorway was built across a large section of the route. Currently, the section of the navigation's towpath running from Lisburn to the centre of Belfast has been restored. A section of National Cycle Route 9, which will eventually link Belfast with Dublin, follows this towpath.

== Angling ==
Atlantic salmon became extirpated in the River Lagan, which enters the Irish Sea through the port of Belfast, between 1750 and 1800, coinciding with a period of major population growth, industrialisation and the construction of a navigable waterway based on the river. The latest record of a salmon population in the river dates from 1744. From 1950 to 1990, water quality in the river improved as a result of improved sewage treatment, the Lagan Navigation was abandoned and fell into disuse, and many industrial effluents were diverted to sewer. A fish survey in the early 1970s found no fish at all in the urban reach of river through Belfast. Brown trout and several other species remained present in the upper reaches of the river throughout the worst of the downstream urban problems. The 1980s saw some recreational angling for non-migratory fish developing in the Belfast reaches of the river, and there were very occasional reports of migratory salmon or sea trout being seen in the river. In 1991, the first of a series of stockings took place and the first adult salmon returned to the Lagan in 1993.

== Wildlife ==
Plants such as Elodea and others have been recorded from the Lagan. The river also hosts a population of otters and a variety of wildfowl.

== See also ==
- List of rivers of Ireland
- List of bridges over the River Lagan
