= Royal Belfast Hospital for Sick Children =

- Belfast Health and Social Care Trust
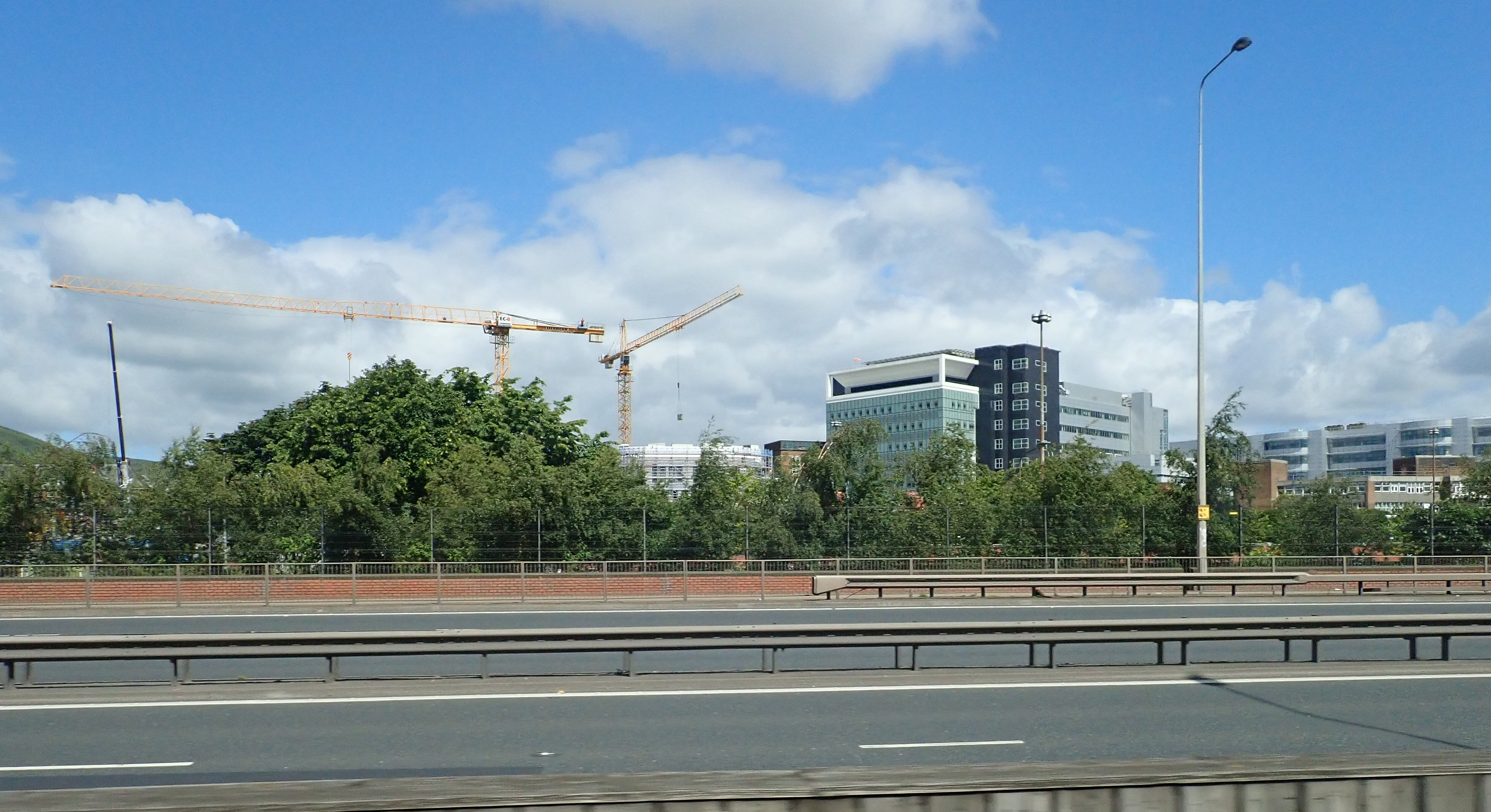
- Construction work at the Royal Belfast Hospital for Sick Children

- Location in Northern Ireland

Geography
- Location: Belfast, Northern Ireland, United Kingdom
- Coordinates: 54.591088°N 5.958002°W

Organisation
- Care system: Health and Social Care in Northern Ireland
- Type: Specialist

History
- Founded: 1873

Links
- Website: www.belfasttrust.hscni.net/hospitals/ChildrensHospital.htm

The Royal Belfast Hospital for Sick Children is a specialised government children's hospital and medical centre in Belfast, Northern Ireland. It is managed by the Belfast Health and Social Care Trust and is the only hospital in Northern Ireland dedicated to children.

== History ==
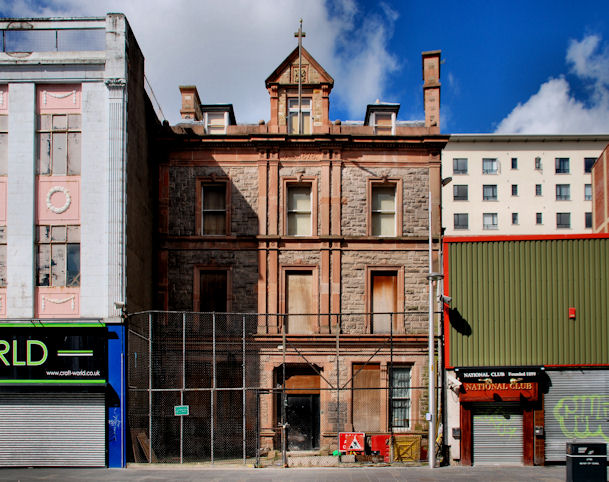
The building in Queen Street in use as the Children's Hospital from 1879 to 1932

The initial meeting of the founders of the hospital was held at 25 King Street, Belfast, in 1873. A board of management was set up to establish funding and run the resulting medical practice. The main focus was to provide healthcare to the impoverished in a time where government assistance was unknown. The building and general running costs had to come from the public. In deference to this, the original writing which spanned all three storeys on the front of the finished hospital would read: Erected A.D.1878 By Voluntary – Subscriptions And Donations – Belfast Hospital For Sick Children.

Some of the more prominent founding board members were: Lord O'Neill (President), (Note: There was a marble tablet installed above the main door to the surgical ward dedicated to his efforts. The presidency passed to his son Robert after his death in 1883.) William Robertson (chairman), Herbert Darbishire (Honorary Secretary), Robert S Craig (Honorary Treasurer), Sir Thomas Dixon (Patron) and Lady Edith Dixon (Patron).

Darbishire once said of that first meeting;

"...a few gentlemen of intelligence and earnestness met in a small dusty room in King Street. The speeches were short, but there was the right ring in what was said; it meant work; it meant success."

The fundraising process began with a citywide distribution of flyers and by 1876 they had managed to raise £2,000 and the board decided that this was sufficient for work to begin. The new hospital was designed by Thomas Jackson in the Baroque style and built by William McCammond in Queen Street in April 1879.

From 1885 onwards several new medical roles were created, including dental specialist, assistant physician, assistant surgeon, external sister, and pathologist. This caused such a strain on funding that the hospital was compelled to stop offering free out-patient medicine as of 1897, opting for a discounted prescription model instead. There was an immediate and catastrophic drop off of out-patient activity and Lord O'Neill repeatedly requested that the decision be reversed. The hospital continued operating despite funding deficits, lack of expansion space, wartime inflation, and the deaths of both Robert O'Neill and Joseph Nelson in 1910. The hospital moved to a new building designed by Tulloch & Fitzsimmons and built by H. & J. Martin in the Falls Road in April 1932. Two wards, the Barbour and Musgrave, were decorated with picture tiles depicting nursery rhymes, biblical scenes and the four seasons. Designed by artist Anne M. Yeames they were manufactured by Minton Hollins.

On 20 December 1996, the Irish Republican Army entered the hospital and shot and injured a Royal Ulster Constabulary police officer who was there to guard Democratic Unionist Party secretary Nigel Dodds (who was there visiting his son). During the incident, a shot hit an empty incubator in the hospital's intensive care unit.

The hospital moved to more modern premises on the same site in December 1998. In 2013 Finance Minister Simon Hamilton announced that a new children's hospital would be built on the same site at a cost of £250 million.

== Notable medical staff ==
Notable medical staff include:

- Joseph Nelson – Eye and ear specialist. He was reputed to have a larger than life, eccentric personality. He marched with Garibaldi in Italy, ran a tea plantation in India, and was a president of the Ulster Medical Society.
- Brice Smyth – Founding physician. Ex-president of the British Gynaecological Society. He was honoured with a wall plaque outside the medical ward.
- John Fagan – Founding surgeon. Instrumental in the invention of the first practical air-filled tyre along with John Dunlop. He stopped practicing in 1897 after inadvertently cutting the wrong limb off a patient. His dedication plaque was placed outside the surgical ward close to Lord O'Neill's plaque.
- Jessie Lennox – Founding matron. An ex-student of Florence Nightingale's school of nursing, she kept in contact with Nightingale regularly. She also assisted with the planning and research for the hospital's design, and was reported to be generally less than accommodating to the involvement of the Ladies League. Miss Lennox resigned in 1891 due to failing health. The Board found her to be almost irreplaceable.
- Morris Fraser – Scottish child psychiatrist.
