= Building preservation and conservation trusts in the UK =

The National Trust and English Heritage are the best known building conservation trusts in the United Kingdom for the protection of listed buildings and buildings of architectural importance. The Churches Conservation Trust, which was initially known as the Redundant Churches Fund, is a UK charity whose purpose is to protect historic churches at risk, those that have been made redundant by the Church of England. The Landmark Trust is a British building conservation charity, founded in 1965 by Sir John and Lady Smith, that rescues buildings of historic interest or architectural merit and then makes them available for holiday rental. There are many buildings within the United Kingdom that are not under the care of any of the aforementioned trusts but are recognised for their importance by local conservation and preservation groups. These groups are listed below:

== UK ==
- Society for the Protection of Ancient Buildings

== England ==
- Bath Preservation Trust
- Birmingham Conservation Trust
- Friends of Moulton Mill, Lincolnshire
- Friends of Bank Hall, Lancashire
- Friends of Victoria Baths, Manchester
- Friends of Williamson's Tunnels, Liverpool
- Heritage Trust for the North West
- Lion Salt Works Trust, Cheshire
- Norfolk Churches Trust
- Poltimore House Trust, Devon
- Somerset Buildings Preservation Trust
- Todmorden Moor Restoration Trust, West Yorkshire
- Wentworth Castle Trust, South Yorkshire
- Wiltshire Historic Buildings Trust
- York Conservation Trust

== Northern Ireland ==
- Belfast Buildings Preservation Trust
- Friends of Lissan Trust
- Ulster Architectural Heritage Society

== Scotland ==
- Kinloch Castle Friends Association
- Mavisbank Trust

== Wales ==
- Ruperra Castle Preservation Trust
- Friends of Newbridge Memo

== See also ==
- Architectural Heritage Fund
- Building Preservation Trust
- Friends of Friendless Churches
- U.K. Association of Building Preservation Trusts
