= Heritage Trust Network =

UK representative body for building trusts

The association logo

The Heritage Trust Network (established 1989 as the United Kingdom Association of Building Preservation Trusts) acts as the representative body for Building Preservation Trusts in the U.K. Membership is open to charities whose principal objective is to preserve historic buildings. There are around 300 BPTs in the United Kingdom but not all are members of the association.

In 2016 the association rebranded as the Heritage Trust Network.

== Legal status ==
The association was constituted as an unincorporated association until 2016, when it incorporated as a company limited by guarantee, and is a registered charity, number 1167662.

== See also ==
- Architectural Heritage Fund
- Belfast Buildings Preservation Trust
- Building Preservation and Conservation Trusts in the UK
- Somerset Buildings Preservation Trust
