= Society for the Protection of Ancient Buildings =

Amenity society in the United Kingdom

The Society for the Protection of Ancient Buildings
- Nickname: Anti-Scrape
- Formation: 1877
- Founder: William Morris, Philip Webb
- Legal status: Charity
- Purpose: Heritage protection
- Headquarters: 37 Spital Square, London
- Members: 6,579 (2022)
- Subsidiaries: SPAB Mills Section
- Website: www.spab.org.uk

The Society for the Protection of Ancient Buildings (SPAB) (also known as Anti-Scrape) is an amenity society founded by William Morris, Philip Webb, and others in 1877 to oppose the destructive 'restoration' of ancient buildings occurring in Victorian England. "Ancient" is used here in the wider sense rather than the more usual modern sense of "pre-medieval."

== History ==
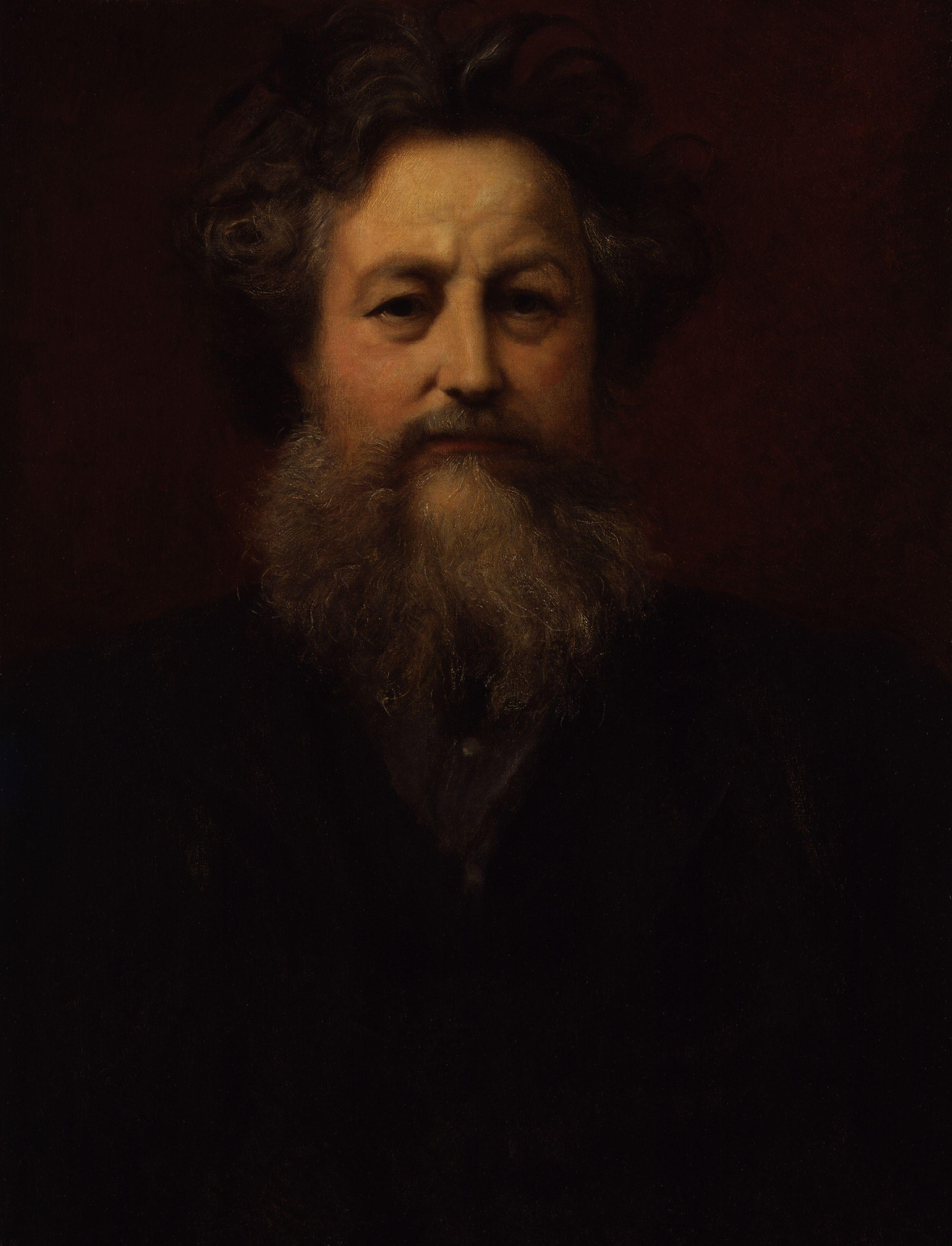
Portrait of William Morris, founder of SPAB, by William Blake Richmond

Morris' call for the society to be founded was provoked by Sir Gilbert Scott's proposed restoration of Tewkesbury Abbey. In an 1877 letter printed in The Athenæum, he wrote

What I wish for, therefore, is that an association should be set on foot to keep watch on old monuments, to protest against all 'restoration' that means more than keeping out wind and weather, and by all means, literary and other, to awaken a feeling that our ancient buildings are not mere ecclesiastical toys, but sacred monuments of the nation's growth and hope.

— William Morris, Letter to The Athenæum, March 1877

Alongside Morris, Philip Webb was instrumental in establishing the society in the month following Morris' letter. Initial supporters announced at the group's initial meeting included Thomas Carlyle, John Ruskin, James Bryce, Sir John Lubbock, Leslie Stephen, Coventry Patmore, Edward Burne-Jones, Holman Hunt, Lord Houghton and A. J. Mundella. Morris drafted a manifesto, and served as Honorary Secretary for the society's first year, continuing as an active member for the remainder of his life.

Morris was particularly concerned about the practice, which he described as "forgery", of attempting to return functioning buildings to an idealized state from the distant past, often involving the removal of elements added in their later development, which he thought had contributed to their interest as documents of the past. Instead, he proposed that ancient buildings should be repaired, not restored, to protect as cultural heritage their entire history. Today, these principles are widely accepted. Morris referred to the society as "Anti-scrape", a reference to the practice of scraping plaster and other later additions from buildings in order to reveal bare stonework.

Early causes taken on by the society included Scott's plans for Tewkesbury Abbey; a planned restoration of the choir of Canterbury Cathedral; destruction of Christopher Wren's churches in the City of London; and the rebuilding of the nave roof of St Alban's Abbey. In 1879, they organised representations against a proposal to rebuild the West front of St Mark's Basilica, Venice.

The approach to conservation advocated by the SPAB was influential upon the National Trust after it acquired its first building, Alfriston Clergy House, in 1895. The SPAB had earlier been consulted on the building and had put the owners in contact with the nascent National Trust. The Trust opted to take a preservation approach to the building, in line with SPAB ideas, which has remained its principle for all its buildings acquired since.

The architect A.R. Powys served as the Secretary of the SPAB for 25 years in the early 20th century.

== Organization and activities ==
Today, the SPAB still operates according to Morris's original manifesto. It campaigns, advises, runs training programmes and courses, conducts research, and publishes information. As one of the National Amenity Societies, the Society is a statutory consultee on alterations to listed buildings, and by law must be notified of any application in England and Wales to demolish any listed building in whole or in part.

The society, which is a registered charity, is based at 37 Spital Square, London. The society has branches in Scotland, Ireland, and Wales. In 2022, the society reported 6579 members.

For its dedicated service to heritage, the society was awarded the European Union Prize for Cultural Heritage / Europa Nostra Award in 2012.

The society's Mills Section is concerned with the protection, repair, and continued use of traditional windmills and watermills. Ken Major carried out much work on its behalf.

An annual award honours the memory of church enthusiast and SPAB member Sir John Betjeman. The award is presented for outstanding repairs to the fabric of places of worship in England and Wales completed in the last 18 months.

== See also ==
- Ancient Monuments Society
- The Society of Architectural Historians of Great Britain
- The Georgian Group
- Building Preservation Trust
  - Building preservation and conservation trusts in the UK
- Architectural Heritage Society of Scotland
- Scottish Civic Trust
