= Queen Street Police Station =

Former police station in Belfast, Northern Ireland

Coordinates: 54°35′54.40″N 5°56′00.00″W

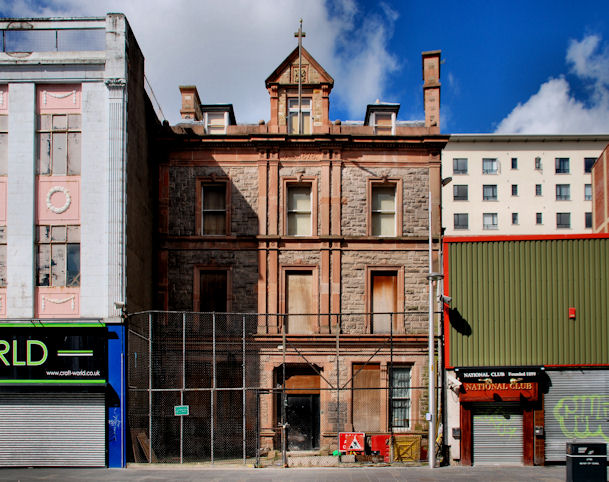
Queen Street Police Station

The Queen Street RUC Station was a Royal Ulster Constabulary (RUC) station in Belfast, Northern Ireland, from 1933 to 2000. It was used as the main premises of the Royal Belfast Hospital for Sick Children from 1878 to 1932. The building has been effectively abandoned since 2000 and is visibly deteriorating. The building was granted listed status in 1979.

== History ==
=== Hospital years ===
The site was purchased from the Belfast Corporation in 1876 as an empty plot of land beside the recently built Gas Office. Prior to this, the plot had been used by the Mechanics Guild.

The building contractor was William McCammond who would also later go on to become the Lord Mayor of Belfast.

Thomas Jackson & Son of Corn Market were commissioned to design the hospital. Thomas and his two sons are credited with designing many of the iconic buildings in and around Belfast.

Their submitted plan was for a baroque style 44 bed hospital, although it ended up opening with only 18. Many of the beds featured illuminated cards dedicated to donators and notable persons. The initial budget was set at £3,840 although it ended up costing in excess of £5,000. It was completed in 1877 ahead of schedule despite several setbacks. However, when the final lettering was being carved close to the heraldic arms of Belfast, it was decided to change this date to 1878 instead.

The hospital finally vacated the building in 1932 after 53 years of operation following the opening of a new hospital on the Falls Road.

=== RUC station years ===
The RUC Crest

The Northern Ireland Ministry of Home Affairs acquired the old hospital property in 1933 when it became available.

Like many other barracks, the building would have been generally left open to the public with its officers patrolling unarmed. This would have been the case right up until the early seventies when the Troubles flared up. It was only after repeated attacks that the officers began to arm themselves and restrict access to the building. Fortifications included a sanger and a tall wire fence. Two constables were shot and murdered on patrol close to the station by the IRA as the Troubles escalated.

The site operated as a police station from 1933 to 2000, being decommissioned on 16 January. All operations were transferred over to the Musgrave police station on Victoria Street before the building was vacated.

== Notable staff ==
Former RUC Chief Constable and first PSNI Chief Constable Sir Ronnie Flanagan served his first three years with the police force here. Well known for being criticized over investigations into the Omagh bombing of 1998, he was stationed in Queen Street when assigned to guard the bodies of three men. Among them was Gunner Robert Curtis, the first British soldier to be killed during the Troubles. Young Flanagan stood vigil alone over the victims in the old Belfast morgue. He once commented:

"There was this notion that the IRA might try to spirit the corpses away and I was there to guard them. I had no firearms or anything."
