= Malone Park =

Private avenue in Belfast, Northern Ireland

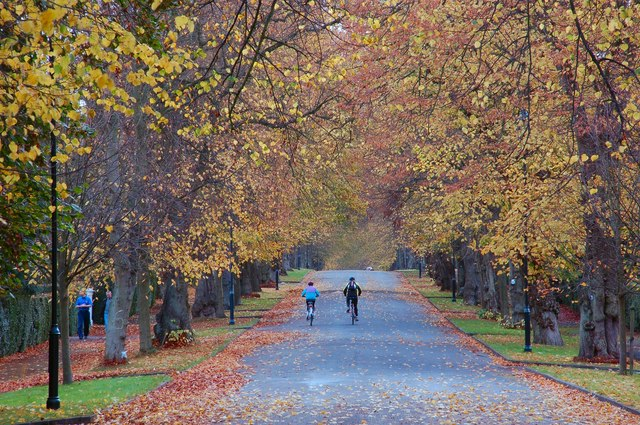
- Interactive map of Malone Park
- Owner: Malone Park Residents Association Ltd
- Location: Belfast, Northern Ireland
- Postal code: BT9
- Coordinates: 54.56737°N 5.95826°W
- East end: Malone Road
- West end: Lisburn Road

Construction
- Inauguration: Victorian

Other
- Known for: Private Avenue

Malone Park is a private avenue in Belfast, Northern Ireland. It forms a conservation area.

The majority of the houses are Victorian and have large grounds surrounding them. There is a gate lodge at each end of the avenue. The Lisburn Road end is inaccessible to vehicular traffic as is the Balmoral Avenue gate. Traffic can only enter from the Malone Road entrance. The avenue is lined by lime trees with grass verges outside every house.

Malone Park has been called Belfast's most exclusive street. At the height of the property bubble in 2007, a Ballymena businessman agreed on £3.5 million for a six-bedroom Victorian property on Malone Park, making it the most expensive residence on the local market at the time. In 2026, a four-bedroom property built in 1938 was sold for £5.5 million.

== Former residents ==
- Lady Edith Stewart Dixon
- Sir George Clark, 1st Baronet
- David Wilson Smyth, High Sheriff of Down

== In popular culture ==
Gareth Russell's young adult novel Popular was set in the fictional Mount Olivet Grammar School, with the main character living in Malone Park.
