= Baron Glentoran =

Title in the Peerage of the United Kingdom

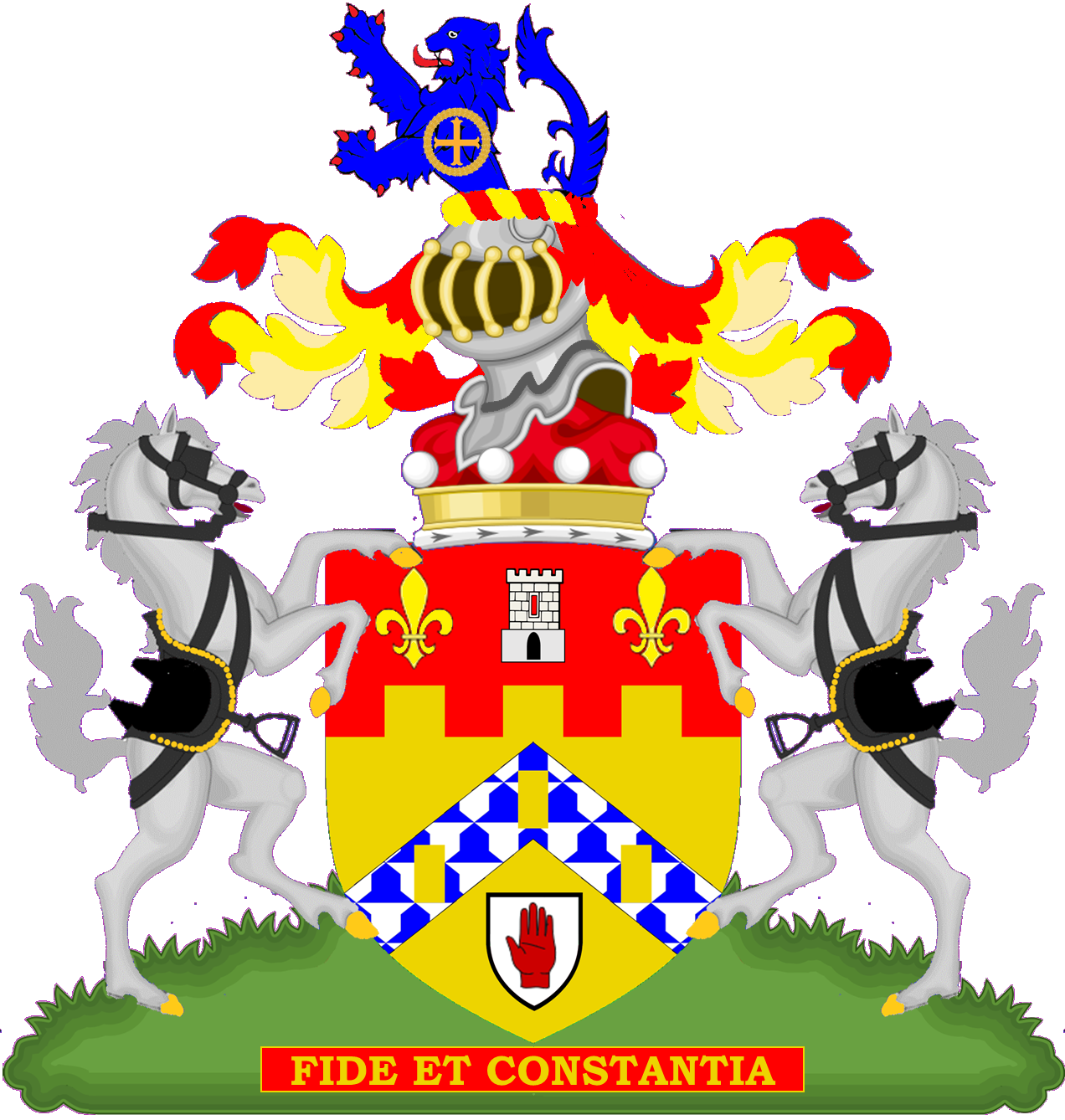
- Crest: A demi-lion rampant Azure, charged on the shoulder with a cross patonce surrounded by a civic crown Or.
- Shield: Or on a chevron Vair three billets of the first on a chief crenellé Gules a tower proper between two fleurs-de-lis Or.
- Supporters: Two war horses Argent unglued Or caparisoned Proper the shabraque Sable broidered of the second.
- Motto: Fide Et Constantia (By Fidelity And Constancy)

Baron Glentoran, of Ballyalloly in the County of Down, is a title in the Peerage of the United Kingdom. It was created on 8 July 1939 for the Unionist politician Herbert Dixon. In 1950 he also succeeded his elder brother as third Baronet, of Ballymenock (see below). His son, the second Baron, was also a politician and served as the last Speaker of the Senate of Northern Ireland. As of 2017 the titles are held by the latter's son, the third Baron, who succeeded in 1995. He is a former Olympic bobsleigh gold medallist as well as a soldier, businessman and politician. Lord Glentoran was one of the ninety elected hereditary peers who remain in the House of Lords after the passing of the House of Lords Act 1999, and sat on the Conservative benches until his June 2018 retirement under the House of Lords Reform Act 2014.

The Dixon baronetcy, of Ballymenock in the County of Antrim, was created in the Baronetage of the United Kingdom in 1903 for Daniel Dixon. He served as Lord Mayor of Belfast and also represented Belfast North in the House of Commons. His eldest son, the second Baronet, was a member of the Senate of Northern Ireland and also served as Lord Lieutenant of Belfast. On his death in 1950 the title passed to his younger brother, the aforementioned Herbert Dixon, who had already been raised to the peerage as Baron Glentoran.

The family seat is Drumadarragh House, near Ballyclare, County Antrim.

== Dixon baronets, of Ballymenock (1903) ==
- Sir Daniel Dixon, 1st Baronet (1844–1907)
- Sir Thomas James Dixon, 2nd Baronet (1868–1950)
- Sir Herbert Dixon, 3rd Baronet (1880–1950) (had already been created Baron Glentoran in 1939)

== Barons Glentoran (1939) ==
- Herbert Dixon, 1st Baron Glentoran (1880–1950)
- Daniel Stewart Thomas Bingham Dixon, 2nd Baron Glentoran (1912–1995)
- (Thomas) Robin Valerian Dixon, 3rd Baron Glentoran (b. 1935)

The heir apparent is the present holder's eldest son, the Hon. Daniel George Dixon (b. 1959).

=== Line of succession ===
- Rt. Hon. Sir Daniel Dixon of Ballymenock, 1st Baronet (1844–1907)
  - Sir Thomas James Dixon, 2nd Baronet (1868–1950)
  - Herbert Dixon, 1st Baron Glentoran (1880–1950)
    - Col. Daniel Stewart Thomas Bingham Dixon, 2nd Baron Glentoran (1912–1995)
      - Maj. (Thomas) Robin Valerian Dixon, 3rd Baron Glentoran (born 1935)
        - (1) Hon. Daniel George Dixon (b. 1959)
          - (2) Anthony Thomas Dixon (b. 1987)
          - (3) Marcus Hope Dixon (b. 1989)
        - (4) Hon. Andrew Wynne Valerian Dixon (b. 1961)
          - (5) Rory Hugh Thomas Dixon (b. 1999)
        - (6) Hon. Patrick Anthony Dixon (b. 1963)
      - (7) Hon. Peter Herbert Dixon (b. 1948)

Baronetage of the United Kingdom
Preceded by Wilson-Todd baronets	Dixon baronets of Ballymenock; 7 October 1903	Succeeded by Cochrane baronets
