= Charles Brett =

Northern Irish solicitor, journalist and author

Sir Charles Edward Bainbridge Brett KBE CBE
- Born: 30 October 1928; Holywood, County Down, Northern Ireland
- Died: 19 December 2005 (aged 77); Northern Ireland
- Other names: C.E.B. Brett; Charles E.B. Brett; Charlie Brett
- Occupation: Solicitor
- Known for: Irish historic building publications, heritage activism, politics; first chairman of the Ulster Architectural Heritage Society; appointed CBE and KBE

Sir Charles Edward Bainbridge Brett, KBE, CBE (30 October 1928 – 19 December 2005), was a Northern Irish solicitor, journalist, author and founding member, and first chairman, of the Ulster Architectural Heritage Society (UAHS). He was known to many simply as Charlie Brett.

== Early life and education ==
Brett was born in Holywood, County Down, into a long line of solicitors, the family firm being L'Estrange & Brett, based in Belfast. He was a partner in this firm from 1954 until 1994. He was educated at Aysgarth School, Rugby School and New College, Oxford, where he was President of the Poetry Society and was a friend of Dylan Thomas.

== Career ==
Between 1949 and 1950, he worked in France as a journalist with the Continental Daily Mail, where he is said to have mixed in anarchist and Trotskyist circles.

In 1956, The 8th Earl of Antrim invited Brett to join the Northern Ireland Committee of the National Trust. On finding there were no books written to prepare himself for this, Brett resolved to write the necessary volumes. In 1967, he became the first chairman of the Ulster Architectural Heritage Society (UAHS), founded with, amongst others, Lady Dunleath. Brett served as chairman for ten years and then as president from 1979 until his death.

Brett founded Hearth Historic Buildings Trust and ran the organisation in its early years including acting as its first chairman.

With the National Trust he put his legal skill to use in order to establish a public footpath along the cliffs of the North Coast of Ulster.

He also sat on the board of the Irish Architectural Archive in Dublin.

== Later life ==
In 1971, he was appointed to the board of the newly created Northern Ireland Housing Executive. He served as chairman for five years from 1979, during which time 50,000 dwellings were built. He was asked to compile a list of historic buildings in Jersey in 1975. In 1986, Brett became the first chairman of the International Fund for Ireland, established to encourage investment in Ireland.

Brett was also involved in Northern Irish politics, being chairman of the Northern Ireland Labour Party for a time

In 1981 he was appointed a CBE. This was followed by a knighthood, as a KBE, in 1990.

== Published works ==
His volumes, published under the name C.E.B. Brett, included books on the local architecture of the buildings of County Armagh, County Antrim and North County Down. What is perhaps his best known work, Buildings of Belfast, 1700-1914, was originally published by Weidenfeld and Nicolson in London in 1967.

In 1974, the National Trust of Guernsey invited Brett to carry out a similar architectural survey of St Peter Port in Guernsey to mark European Architectural Heritage Year in 1975, resulting in the publication of Buildings in the Town and Parish of St Peter Port. The successful result was repeated for the island of Alderney in 1976, and Saint Helier in Jersey in 1977.

He wrote one satirical volume under the pen name "Albert Rechts", which was an anagram of his name.

He also wrote a volume titled Long Shadows Cast Before , incorporating family history, political commentary and autobiography.

== Family ==
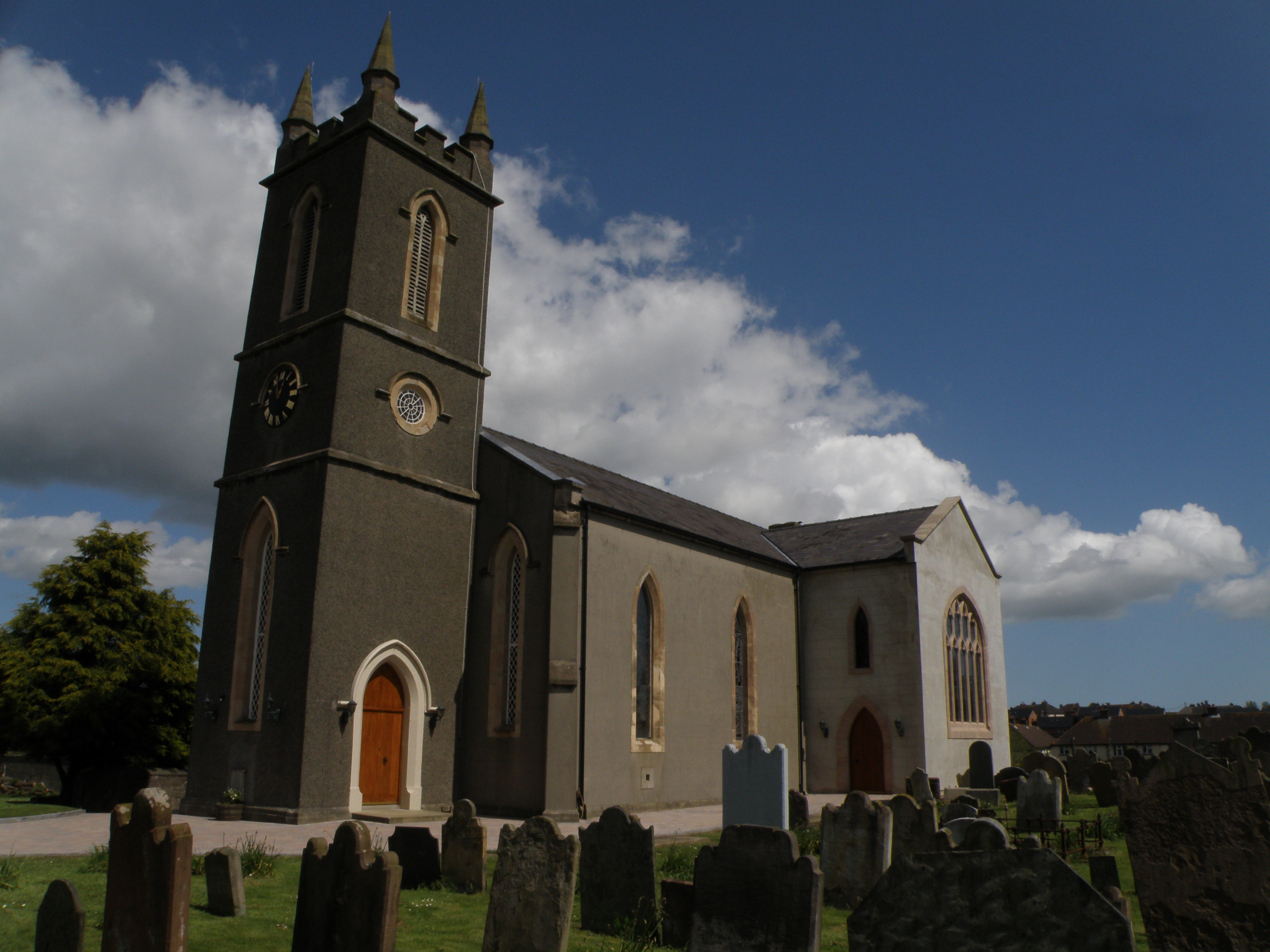
St. Mary's Church of Ireland

Brett was married and had three sons, and seven grandchildren. His church memorial is located alongside those of his family in the Comber Church of Ireland Parish Church of St. Mary, in Comber, North County Down.

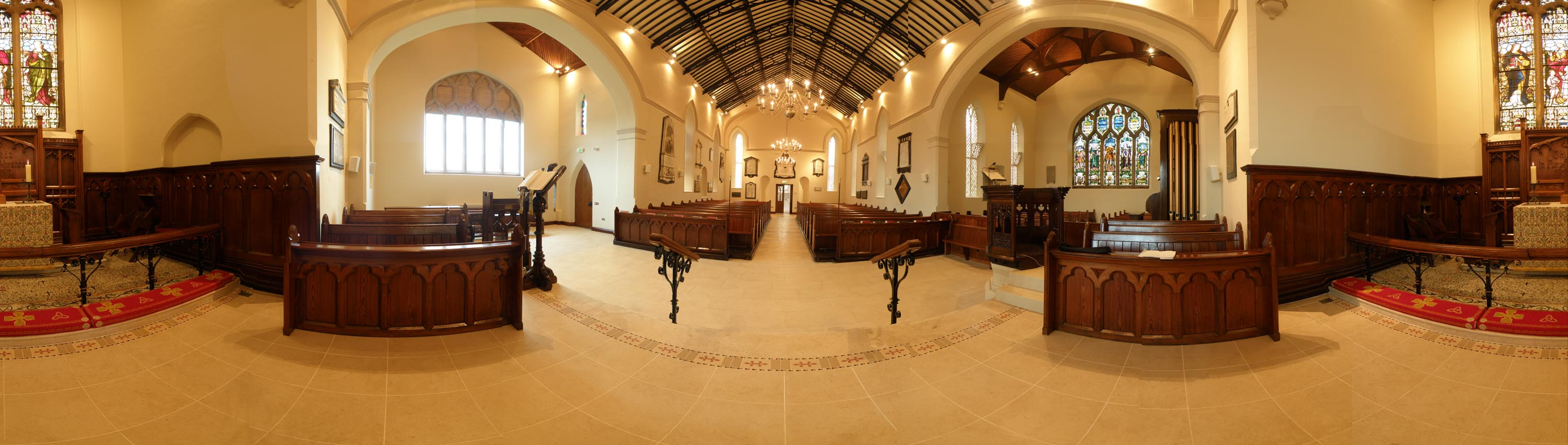
Interior of St. Mary's Church of Ireland

== Bibliography ==
- Obituary in "The Times"
- Obituary in "The Independent"
- Obituary by The Arts Council of Northern Ireland
