= Architectural Heritage Fund =

Charity founded in 1976 to conserve historic buildings in the UK

The Architectural Heritage Fund
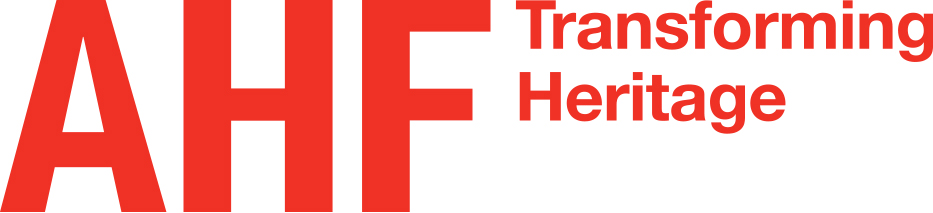
- Abbreviation: AHF
- Legal status: Charity
- Headquarters: 3 Spital Yard, London, E1 6AQ
- Region served: United Kingdom
- Chief Executive: Matthew Mckeague
- Chair of Trustees: Ros Kerslake
- Website: https://ahfund.org.uk/

The Architectural Heritage Fund (AHF) is a registered charity (No. 266780) founded in 1976 to promote the conservation and re-use of historic buildings across the United Kingdom. The AHF provides communities with advice, grants and loans to help them find enterprising and sustainable ways to revitalise the old buildings they love, particularly in economically disadvantaged areas. For over 40 years, it has been the leading social investor in creating new futures for historic buildings.

== Scope ==
To apply for an AHF grant, organisations must be a not-for-private-profit organisation or one of the lowest tiers of the local government.

The AHF provides loan finance to formally constituted incorporated charities, community businesses or social enterprises whose members have limited liability.

Buildings supported must be of historic or architectural importance – they may be listed, in a conservation area, or of special significance to the community.

As of 2020, the AHF had awarded loans with a total value of £125m to over 890 projects across the United Kingdom and disbursed more than 750 individual grants with a total value of over £10M.

== Legal status ==
The fund is incorporated as a company limited by guarantee without a share capital and registered at Companies House number 01150304.

== Example projects ==
Some of the projects the AHF has supported include:

- Jubilee Pool, Penzance, Cornwall, England
- Riddel's Warehouse, Belfast, County Antrim, Northern Ireland
- Circus Eruption, Swansea, Wales
- Midsteeple Quarter, Dumfries, Dumfries and Galloway, Scotland
- 170-175 High Street West, Sunderland, Tyne and Wear, England
- The Woolstore, Caledon, County Tyrone, Northern Ireland
- Haverhub, Haverfordwest, Pembrokeshire, Wales
- Fruitmarket Gallery, Edinburgh, Scotland

List of all case studies:

- https://ahfund.org.uk/news/case-studies/

== See also ==
- Building Preservation Trust
- Building Preservation and Conservation Trusts in the UK
- U.K. Association of Building Preservation Trusts
- National Lottery Heritage Fund
- Historic England
- Historic Environment Scotland
- Cadw
- Department for Communities
- Social Investment Business
