= Clark baronets of Dunlambert (1917) =

Escutcheon of the Clark baronets of Dunlambert

The Clark baronetcy, of Dunlambert, Belfast, was created in the Baronetage of the United Kingdom on 6 July 1917 for the businessman and politician George Clark. The 3rd Baronet was a member of the Parliament of Northern Ireland for Belfast Dock.

== Clark baronets, of Dunlambert (1917) ==
- Sir George Smith Clark, 1st Baronet (1861–1935)
- Sir George Ernest Clark, 2nd Baronet (1882–1950)
- Sir George Anthony Clark, 3rd Baronet (1914–1991)
- Sir Colin Douglas Clark, 4th Baronet (1918–1995)
- Sir Jonathan George Clark, 5th Baronet (born 1947)

The heir apparent is the present holder's only son Simon George Gray Clark (born 1975).
