= Daniel Dixon, 2nd Baron Glentoran =

The Rt Hon. Lord Glentoran, KBE

Daniel Stewart Thomas Bingham Dixon, 2nd Baron Glentoran, KBE (19 January 1912 – 22 July 1995), was a Northern Irish soldier and politician.

Glentoran was the son of Herbert Dixon, 1st Baron Glentoran. After being educated at Eton and Sandhurst he was appointed aide-de-camp to the GOC in Northern Ireland in 1935. He served with the Grenadier Guards in World War II, for which he was mentioned in dispatches. In 1950 he succeeded his father as Baron Glentoran, as well being elected in his place as a Ulster Unionist member for Belfast Bloomfield in the Northern Ireland House of Commons (where peers could also hold a seat).

Appointed Parliamentary Secretary to the Ministry of Finance in 1952, Lord Glentoran was made Minister of Commerce the following year, a post he held until elected to the Northern Ireland Senate in 1961. He was the minister responsible for the destruction of much of the Great Northern Railway in Northern Ireland, when he unilaterally closed the Portadown – Armagh – Monaghan, Clones – Enniskillen -Belleek and Enniskillen – Omagh railway lines in 1957. Consequently, the privately owned Sligo, Leitrim and Northern Counties Railway linking Enniskillen to Sligo was forced to close. He was then Minister in and Leader of the Senate for three years, becoming its last speaker in 1964.

Lord Glentoran was said to have had such a "grand" demeanour that once, when visiting America, a Texas newspaper carried the headline "Irish royalty to visit Texas."

Appointed Knight Commander of the Most Excellent Order of the British Empire (KBE) in 1973, Lord Glentoran was also the Lord Lieutenant (and from 1950 to 1976 Lieutenant) for Belfast from 1976 to 1985. In 1933, he married Lady Diana Mary Wellesley (died 1984), daughter of the third Earl Cowley, by whom he had three children; the eldest is Olympic gold medal-winning bobsledder Robin Dixon.

Lord Glentoran died in 1995, aged 83, and was succeeded to the Barony by his son Robin.

Coat of arms of Daniel Dixon, 2nd Baron Glentoran
Crest A demi-lion rampant Azure, charged on the shoulder with a cross patonce surrounded by a civic crown Or. Escutcheon Or on a chevron Vair three billets of the first on a chief crenellé Gules a tower proper between two fleurs-de-lis Or. Supporters Two war horses Argent unglued Or caparisoned Proper the shabraque Sable broidered of the second. Motto Fide Et Constantia (By Fidelity And Constancy)

== See also ==
- List of Northern Ireland Members of the House of Lords

Parliament of Northern Ireland
Preceded by Herbert Dixon, 1st Baron Glentoran	Member of Parliament for Belfast Bloomfield; 1950–1961	Succeeded by Walter Scott
Political offices
Vacant	Parliamentary Secretary to the Ministry of Commerce and Production; 1952–1953	Vacant
Preceded by William McCleery	Minister of Commerce and Production; 1953–1961	Succeeded by Jack Andrews
Preceded by Alexander Gordon	Speaker of the Senate of Northern Ireland; 1964–1973	Senate abolished
Honorary titles
Preceded by Sir Thomas Dixon, Bt	Lord Lieutenant of Belfast; 1950–1985	Succeeded by Sir Robin Kinahan
Peerage of the United Kingdom
Preceded by Herbert Dixon	Baron Glentoran; 1950–1995	Succeeded by Robin Dixon
Baronetage of the United Kingdom
Preceded by Herbert Dixon	Baronet (of Ballymenock); 1950–1995	Succeeded by Robin Dixon
