= Clark baronets =

There have been four baronetcies created for persons with the surname Clark (as distinct from Clarke, Clerk and Clerke), all in the Baronetage of the United Kingdom. Two of the creations are extant as of 2026.

- Clark baronets of St George's, Hanover Square (1837)
- Clark baronets of Cavendish Square (1883)
- Clark baronets of Melville Crescent, Edinburgh (1886)
- Clark baronets of Dunlambert (1917)

== See also ==
- Clarke baronets
- Clerk baronets
- Clerke baronets
- Clerk family
