= James Horner Haslett =

Irish politician

Sir James Horner Haslett (January 1832 – 18 August 1905) was an Irish Conservative Party and then Unionist Party politician who sat in the House of Commons of the United Kingdom from 1885 to 1886 and 1896 to 1905.

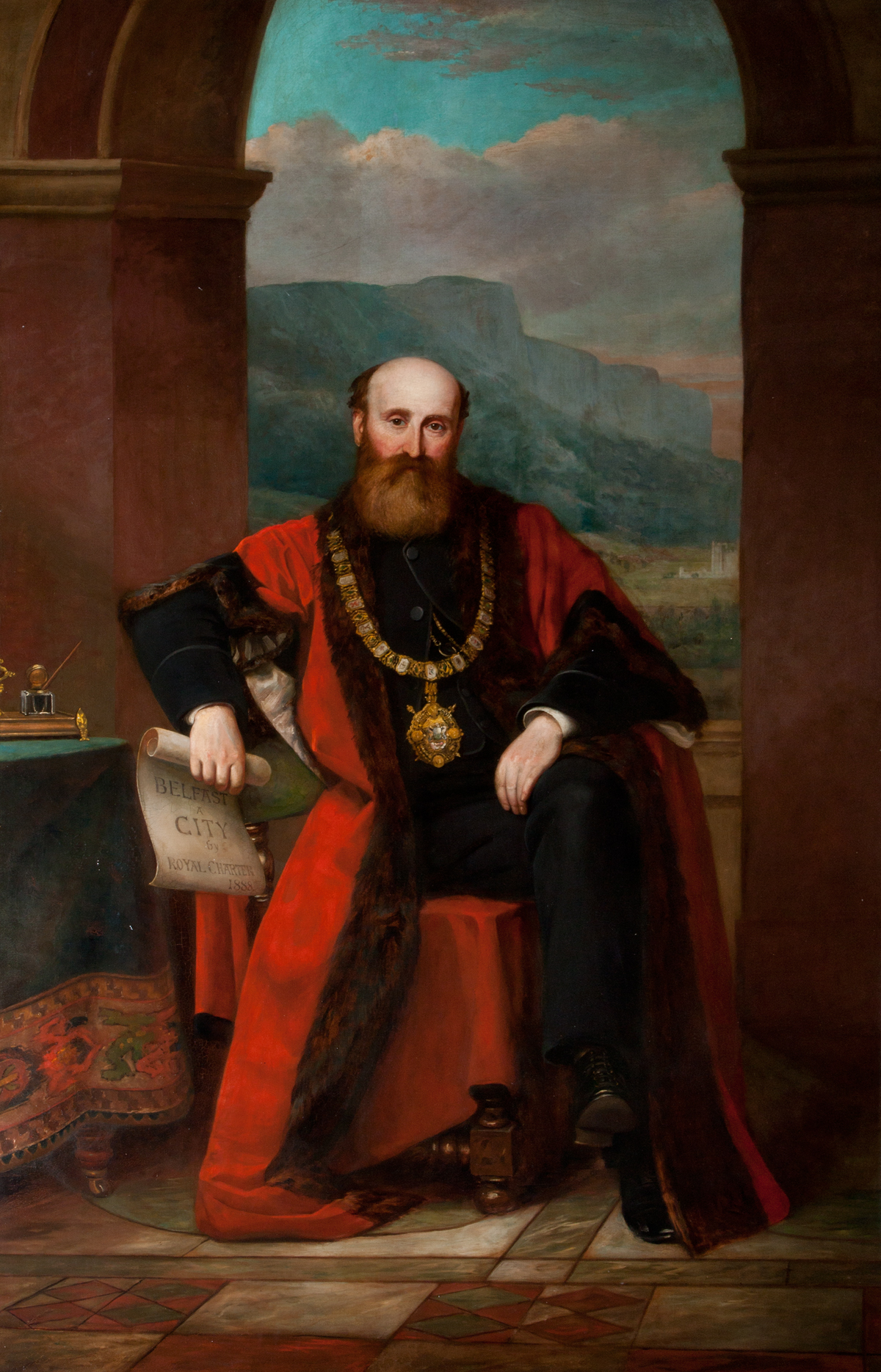
Portrait of Sir James Haslett, as found in City Hall

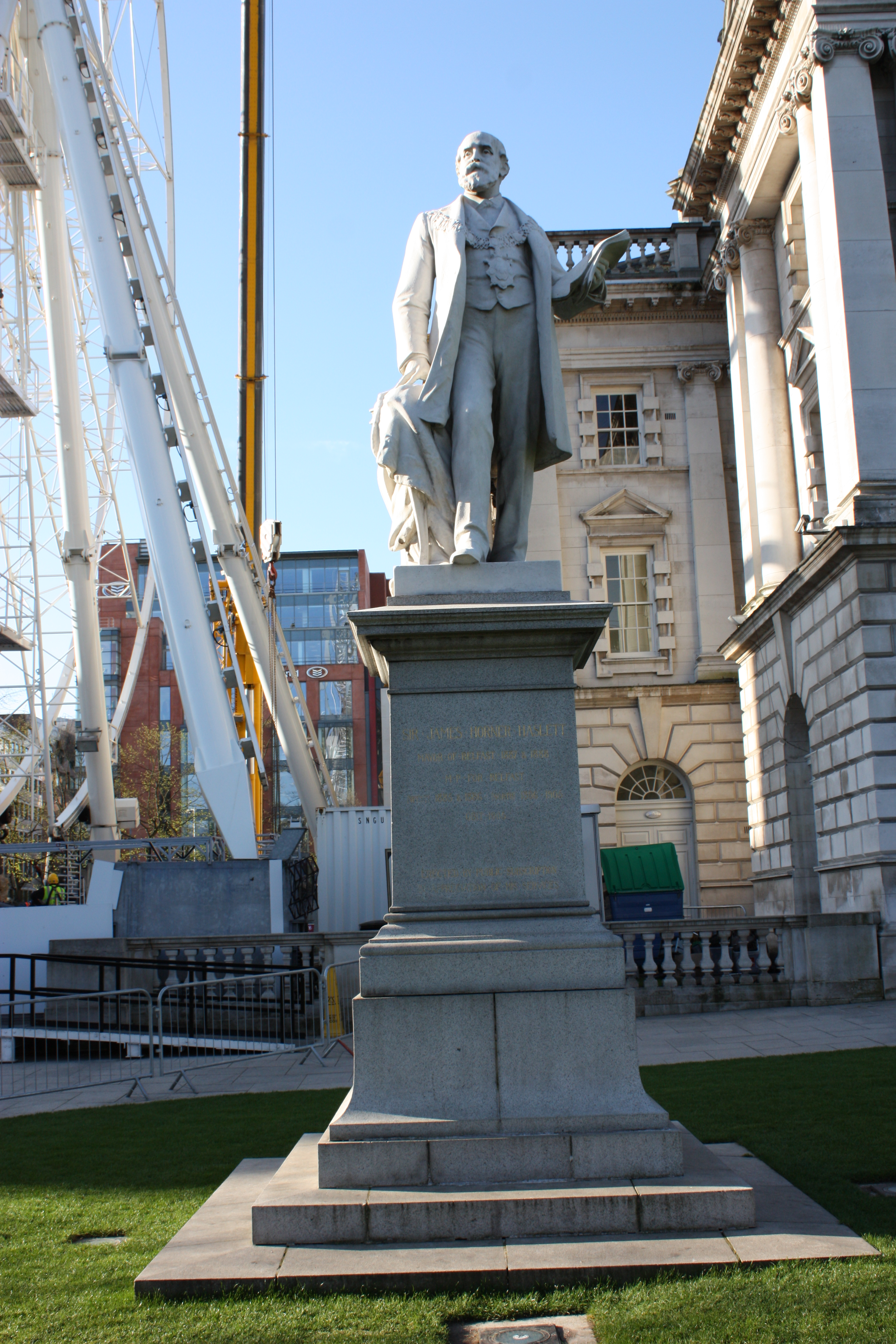
Statue of Sir James Haslett outside Belfast City Hall

Haslett was born in Knock, Belfast, the son of the Rev. Henry Haslett of Castlereagh, County Down and his wife Mary Wilson, daughter of John Wilson, linen merchant of Drumcroon, Coleraine. He was educated at the Royal Belfast Academical Institution and became a chemist and druggist. He was an alderman, and a Justice of the Peace (J.P.) of Belfast.

At the 1885 general election Haslett was elected Member of Parliament for Belfast West. He held the seat until 1886. He was Mayor of Belfast in 1887 and knighted in the same year. He was mayor again in 1888.

He returned to the House of Commons at a by-election in January 1896 as MP for Belfast North. He was re-elected in 1900, and held the seat until his death in 1905 in Belfast, aged 73.

Haslett married Annie Rea in London in 1878:

HASLETT—REA February 12, in New Court Independent Chapel, Tollington Park, London, by Rev. John Corbin, James H. Haslett, Belfast, Annie Rea, Hazelville Road, Hornsey, London

(Northern Whig - 14 February 1878)

Civic offices
Preceded by Edward Harland	Mayor of Belfast; 1887–1888	Succeeded by Charles C. Conor
Parliament of the United Kingdom
New constituency	Member of Parliament for Belfast West; 1885 – 1886	Succeeded by Thomas Sexton
Preceded by Edward Harland	Member of Parliament for Belfast North; 1896 – 1905	Succeeded by Sir Daniel Dixon, Bt
