= Sir Daniel Dixon, 1st Baronet =

Irish businessman and politician

Sir Daniel Dixon, 1st Baronet PC Deputy lieutenant
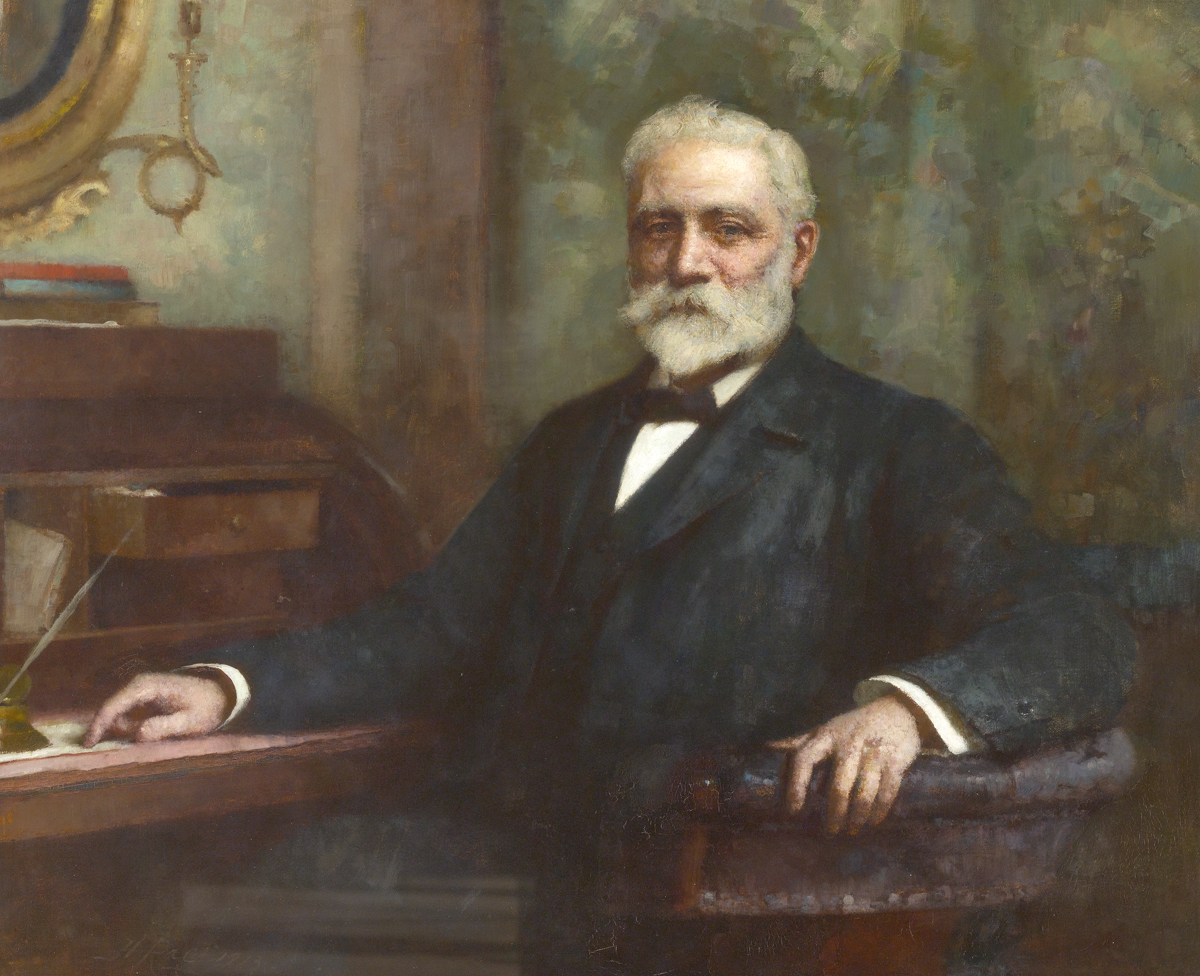
- Portrait of Dixon by Henrietta Rae

Member of Parliament for Belfast North
- In office 1905–1907
- Preceded by: James Horner Haslett
- Succeeded by: George Clark

1st Lord Mayor of Belfast
- In office 1892–1893
- Preceded by: Office established
- Succeeded by: William McCammond

Personal details
- Born: 28 March 1844 Larne, Ireland
- Died: 10 March 1907 (aged 62) Belfast, Ireland
- Party: Irish Unionist Alliance
- Spouses: Lizzie Agnew (m. 1867; died 1868) Annie Shaw (m. 1870)
- Occupation: Businessman; politician

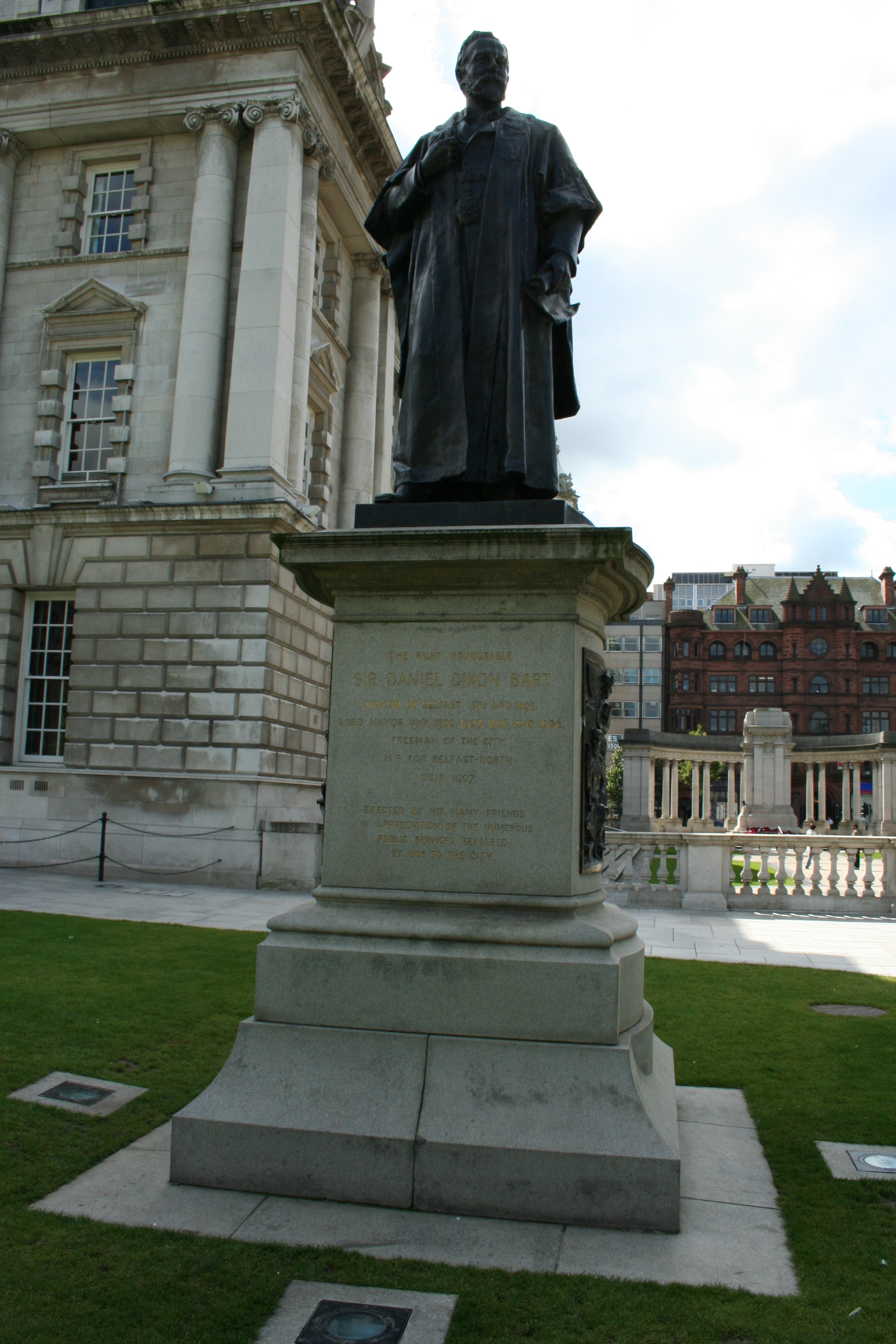
Monument to Sir Daniel Dixon, grounds of Belfast City Hall, Northern Ireland

Sir Daniel Dixon, 1st Baronet, PC (Ire), DL (28 March 1844 – 10 March 1907) was an Irish businessman and politician.

== Early life ==
Dixon was born on 28 March 1844 the son of Thomas and Sarah Dixon of Larne, County Antrim; his father was a merchant and shipowner. He was educated at the Royal Belfast Academical Institution. He joined his father's timber business, Thomas Dixon and Sons, becoming a partner in 1864.

== Political career ==
He served as Mayor of Belfast in 1892 and as Lord Mayor of Belfast in three terms; 1893, 1901 to 1903, and 1905 to 1906. He was also a member of parliament for Belfast North as an Irish Unionist from 1905 to 1907.

Dixon was appointed to the Privy Council of Ireland in the 1902 Coronation Honours list published on 26 June 1902, and was sworn in by the Lord Lieutenant of Ireland, Earl Cadogan, at Dublin Castle on 11 August 1902. In October 1903 he was created a Baronet, of Ballymenock in the County of Antrim.

== Businessman ==
Dixon was head of one of the largest shipowning companies in Ireland.

== Family life ==
Dixon married, firstly, Lizzie, daughter of James Agnew, in 1867. After his first wife's death in 1868 he married, secondly, Annie, daughter of James Shaw, in 1870. He died on 10 March 1907 in Belfast, aged 62, and was succeeded in the baronetcy by his eldest son Thomas. Lady Dixon died in 1918.

== Sources ==
- Kidd, Charles; Williamson, David (editors). Debrett's Peerage and Baronetage (1990 edition). New York: St Martin's Press, 1990.
- Leigh Rayment's list of baronets
- Leigh Rayment's Historical List of MPs

Parliament of the United Kingdom
| Preceded by Sir James Horner Haslett | Member of Parliament for Belfast North; 1905–1907 | Succeeded by George Clark |
Civic offices
| New office previously Mayor of Belfast | Lord Mayor of Belfast; 1892–1893 | Succeeded by William McCammond |
| Preceded by R. J. McConnell | Lord Mayor of Belfast; 1901–04 | Succeeded by Otto Jaffe |
| Preceded by Otto Jaffe | Lord Mayor of Belfast; 1905–07 | Succeeded by Anthony Ashley-Cooper |
Baronetage of the United Kingdom
| New title | Baronet (of Ballymenock); 1903–1907 | Succeeded by Thomas Dixon |
