= Kelly's Cellars =

Public house in Belfast, Northern Ireland

Coordinates: 54.599°N 5.932°W

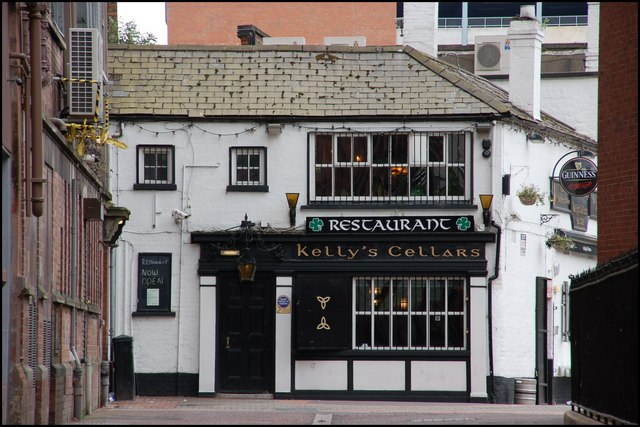
Kelly's Cellars, Belfast

Kelly's Cellars is a pub in Belfast, Northern Ireland, situated at 30 Bank Street in the city centre. Built on 14 March 1720, it is one of the oldest pubs of Belfast.

It sits in what used to be an alleyway off Royal Avenue, but a few buildings were knocked down and now Kelly's sits in a square beside Castlecourt, a major Belfast shopping centre. It provides pub food and traditional music sessions. It remains resolutely old-fashioned, with vaulted ceiling and elbow-worn bar and is crammed with bric-a-brac.

== History ==
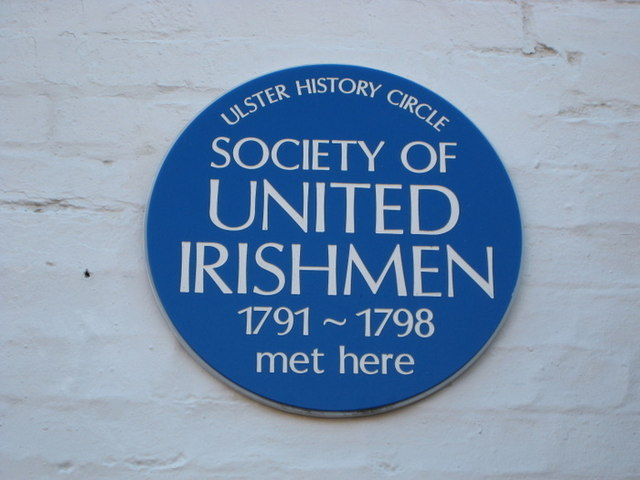
Blue plaque to United Irishmen

It was a meeting place for Henry Joy McCracken and the United Irishmen when they were planning the 1798 Rising. The story goes that McCracken hid behind the bar when British soldiers came for him.

The influential nationalist politician Joseph Devlin was assistant manager of the pub in the 1890s.

In September 2004 the pub had a grand re-opening under new management. In 2007 a blue plaque was erected on the site by the Ulster History Circle stating that the Society of United Irishmen met there during the period 1791 to 1798.

=== Ownership ===
From 2000 to 2024 the pub was owned by Lily Mulholland and Martin O’Hara. In 2024 the pub was bought by the Downey pub-owning group of brothers Henry, Seamus and John.

== Delisting and relisting ==
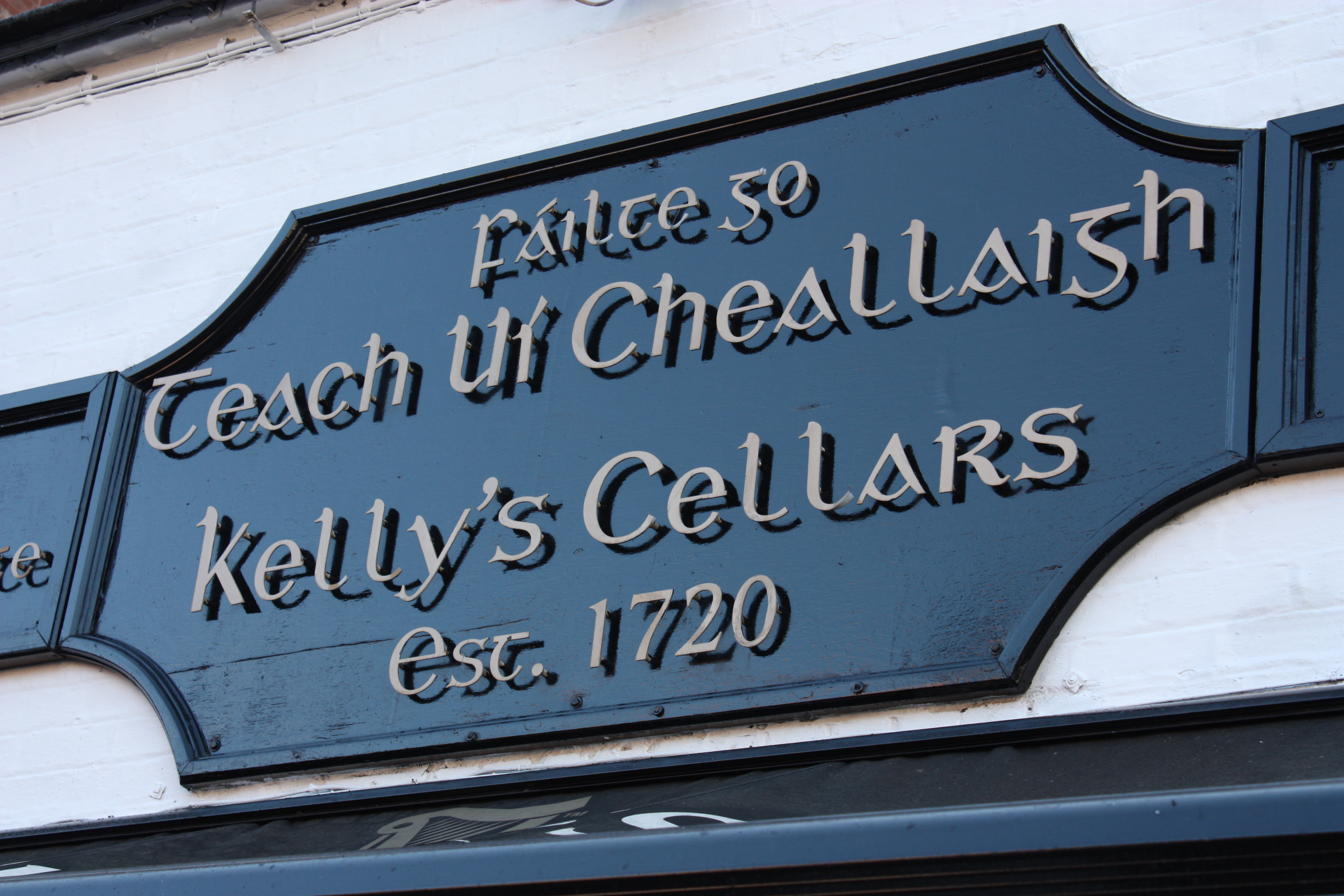
Kellys Cellars, Belfast, February 2011

In February 2015 it was reported that the Department of the Environment (Northern Ireland) proposed delisting 17 Belfast Buildings, including Kelly's Cellars, subject to review by the Historic Buildings Council and Belfast City Council. The Ulster Architectural Heritage Society declared that "despite their present condition, all buildings currently proposed for delisting contribute to the value of Belfast’s fragile built heritage and are important resources to promote tourism, economic investment and social regeneration".

As part of the significant backlash against the proposal to delist Kelly's Cellars, Meghan Finlay (née Rice) of Massachusetts set up an online petition to stop it, based on the pub's historical significance. The petition attracted more than 2,000 signatures and brought to international attention the fight to maintain the listed status of Kelly's Cellars. The decision to strip the pub of its protected status has since been reversed. On 25 August 2015 following the campaign victory, Kelly's Cellars released, via their official Facebook page, a statement of thanks to all who had supported their cause.
