= 1905 Belfast North by-election =

UK Parliamentary by-election

The 1905 Belfast North by-election was held on 14 September 1905 when the incumbent Irish Unionist MP, Sir James Horner Haslett died. It was retained by the Unionist candidate Sir Daniel Dixon.

1905 Belfast North by-election
| Party | Candidate | Votes | % | ±% |
|---|---|---|---|---|
| Irish Unionist | Daniel Dixon | 4,440 | 52.8 | −16.4 |
| Labour Repr. Cmte. | William Walker | 3,966 | 47.2 | New |
| Majority | | 474 | 5.6 | −32.8 |
| Turnout | | 8,406 | 78.1 | +18.5 |
| Registered electors | | 10,762 | | |
| Irish Unionist hold | | Swing | | |
