= Fionnuala Jay-O'Boyle =

British lobbyist, charity trustee and public official

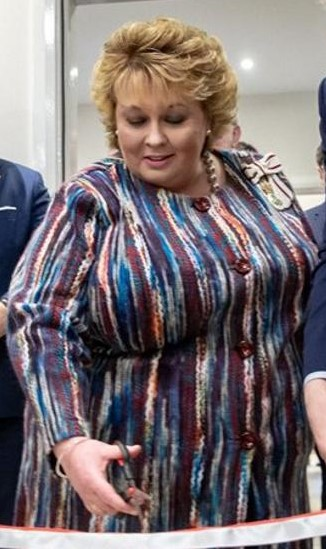

Dame Fionnuala Mary Jay-O'Boyle, DBE DStJ (born 22 March 1960) is a British lobbyist, charity trustee, and public official. She is the Lord-Lieutenant for the County Borough of Belfast since 2014, and was a member of the House of Lords Appointments Commission from 2019 until September 2025.

Jay-O'Boyle founded the Belfast Buildings Trust in 1996, of which she remains patron. She was appointed Member of the Order of the British Empire (MBE), Commander of the Order of the British Empire (CBE) in the 2008 Birthday Honours and Dame Commander of the Order of the British Empire (DBE) in the 2022 Birthday Honours for services to the community in Northern Ireland. Jay-O'Boyle was also appointed a Dame of the Order of Saint John (DStJ).She was presented an Honorary Doctorate of Laws for Distinction in Public Service at Queen's University Belfast.

== Life ==
Fionnuala Mary Jay-O'Boyle, who was born in Derry in 1960 and is married to Richard Jay, trained as a singer and has worked in marketing and communications. She was a trustee of The Prince's Regeneration Trust from 2003 and of The Prince's Foundation for Building Community from 2016 until they were both merged into The Prince's Foundation in 2018. She founded the Belfast Buildings Trust in 1996, of which she remains patron. She was a deputy lieutenant for Belfast from 2009 until her elevation in 2014. She is the Lord-Lieutenant for the County Borough of Belfast since 2014, and a member of the House of Lords Appointments Commission since 2019.

== Honours and awards ==
Jay-O'Boyle was appointed Member of the Order of the British Empire (MBE) in 2000, Commander of the Order of the British Empire (CBE) in the 2008 Birthday Honours and Dame Commander of the Order of the British Empire (DBE) in the 2022 Birthday Honours for services to the community in Northern Ireland.

Jay-O'Boyle was also appointed a Dame of the Order of Saint John (DStJ) on 22 April 2021.

On 12 December 2022, Jay-O'Boyle was presented an Honorary Doctorate of Laws for Distinction in Public Service at Queen's University Belfast.

Honorary titles
Preceded by Mary Peters	Lord Lieutenant of Belfast; 6 July 2014 – present	Incumbent
