= Belfast Buildings Trust =

Architectural conservation trust in Northern Ireland

- Founded: 1996
- Founder: Fionnuala Jay-O'Boyle CBE LL
- Type: Charity
- Purpose: Heritage led regeneration, built heritage, social and physical regeneration
- Location: The Gate Lodge, 511a Ormeau Road, Belfast, BT7 3GS
- Origins: Founded to rescue historic buildings in Belfast through heritage led regeneration
- Region served: Belfast
- Key people: Chairman – John Marshall BEM Patron – Fionnuala Jay-O'Boyle CBE DL
- Website: www.belfastbuildingstrust.org

The Belfast Buildings Trust (BBT), founded in 1996 as the Belfast Buildings Preservation Trust, is a cross-community building preservation trust with charitable status that delivers physical, social, and economic regeneration through the reuse of landmark buildings in Belfast, Northern Ireland.

Each building rescued by the trust seeks to regenerate the community it serves in a variety of ways, from traditional skills promotion to job creation and engendering a sense of civic pride. The BBT's work demonstrates what can be achieved through vision, determination and community energy. It is committed to restoring to Belfast those buildings that make it special, and which are landmarks in the heart of the city's communities.

The current chairman is John Marshall BEM, retired registrar at the Royal Belfast Academical Institution. The founding chair, Fionnuala Jay-O'Boyle CBE DL, with a background in public affairs, has extensive experience of regeneration projects having been a trustee of a number of regeneration charities, including the Prince's Regeneration Trust.

== Completed projects ==
The BBT has completed three regeneration projects: St Patrick's School, Donegall Street; Christ Church, College Square North; and The Gate Lodge at the former Good Shepherd Convent on Ormeau Road, which now serves as the trust's headquarters.

=== St Patrick's National School (1828) ===
St Patrick's was built by Newryborn architect Timothy Hevey on land donated by the Marquess of Donegall for the first Catholic national school in the city. It continued to serve the educational needs of the north of the city until it closed in 1982.

=== Christ Church (1832) ===
This church, built by the Dublin architect William Farrell suffered a declining congregation and closed in the early 1990s including an arson attack in 1995.

With a similar package of funding to St Patrick's School and a partnership with the board of governors of The Royal Belfast Academical Institution the building is now restored as a library and IT centre, with extensive community use. The building was opened by the Prince of Wales in 2003 and has won many architectural and regeneration awards. This building in particular is proof of the way in which restored buildings can bridge communities when politicians' words cannot.

== See also ==
- Building Preservation Trust
- Hearth Historic Buildings Trust
