= 1907 Belfast North by-election =

UK Parliamentary by-election

- 17 April 1907

Candidate	Clark	Walker
Party	Irish Unionist	Labour
Popular vote	6,021	4,194
Percentage	58.9%	41.1%
MP before election
Sir Daniel Dixon
Irish Unionist
Subsequent MP
George Clark
Irish Unionist

The 1907 Belfast North by-election was held on 17 April 1907. The by-election was held due to the death of the incumbent Irish Unionist MP, Daniel Dixon. It was won by the Irish Unionist candidate George Clark. North Belfast had previously been a marginal seat with the Labour candidate, William Walker, coming within 500 votes of winning on the two previous occasions. In order to win over Protestant voters, Walker made clear that he was opposed to Home Rule

1907 Belfast North by-election
Party	Candidate	Votes	%	±%
Irish Unionist	George Smith Clark	6,021	58.9	+7.4
Labour	William Walker	4,194	41.1	−7.4
Majority		1,827	17.8	+14.7
Turnout		10,215	84.7	+1.1
Registered electors		12,065		
Irish Unionist hold		Swing	+7.4	
