= Jessie Lennox =

British nurse (1830–1933)

Jessie Lennox (1830-1933) was a British nurse, trained at Florence Nightingale's school of nursing. She is also known for accompanying the writer Anna Mackenzie and Mary Livingstone, wife of David Livingstone, when they travelled to Africa to find him in 1862.

== Missionary work ==
Jessie Lennox went to Natal, South Africa in the 1850s to work as a missionary with Bishop Charles Frederick Frazier Mackenzie (1825–62) who later on travelled with David Livingstone to the Zambezi river region. She also accompanied Mary Livingstone when she travelled to the Zambezi river region.

== Nightingale Training School for Nurses ==
After coming back in England, Jessie Lennox attended the Nightingale Training School for Nurses, founded by Florence Nightingale (1820-1910) in 1860. She became a close friend of Florence Nightingale, corresponding with her over the years.

"Will you kindly accept a little sum to help in things which must be always cropping up, that you want to do among your little ones? Please tell me when you write how is going on the boy that bought the pig for his family with the money given him for his own wooden leg. God bless you again and again."

~ excerpt from a letter by Florence Nightingale to Matron Lennox – December 1885

== Later career ==
Appointed by the War Office, Lennox was one of the first six Army Sisters at the Royal Victoria Hospital in Netley, a large military hospital, commissioned by Queen Victoria and mainly used during World War I. The hospital had a bakery, gasworks, reservoir and prison.

Later, Lennox became the matron of the Royal Belfast Hospital for Sick Children. The main goal of this institution, founded in 1873, was to guarantee healthcare to the working classes in Ireland. Lennox assisted with the planning and research for the hospital's design in its first location at Queen Street, Belfast. Lennox held the role of matron for 18 years before retirement.

After her retirement, Jessie Lennox acted as an honorary matron at the epileptic colony at Bridge of Weir, in Scotland. The epileptic colony, one of the first in Scotland, was founded by William Quarriers in 1876.

On 14 July 1927, Jessie Lennox was presented to King Edward VIII and to the Princes of Wales, during the opening ceremony for the Scottish War Memorial at Edinburgh Castle.

== Death ==
Lennox died in Edinburgh at the age of 102 in January 1933.
