= 1896 Belfast North by-election =

UK Parliamentary by-election

The Belfast North by-election of 1896 was held on 22 January 1896. The by-election was held due to the death of the incumbent Irish Unionist Party MP, Edward Harland. It was won by the Irish Unionist Party candidate James Horner Haslett.

1896 Belfast North by-election
Party	Candidate	Votes	%	±%
Irish Unionist	James Horner Haslett	3,595	51.1	N/A
Ind. Unionist	Adam Turner	3,434	48.9	N/A
Majority		161	2.2	N/A
Turnout		7,029	76.4	N/A
Registered electors		9,201		
Irish Unionist hold		Swing	N/A	
