= Edith Dixon =

Scottish philanthropist

Lady Dixon DBE
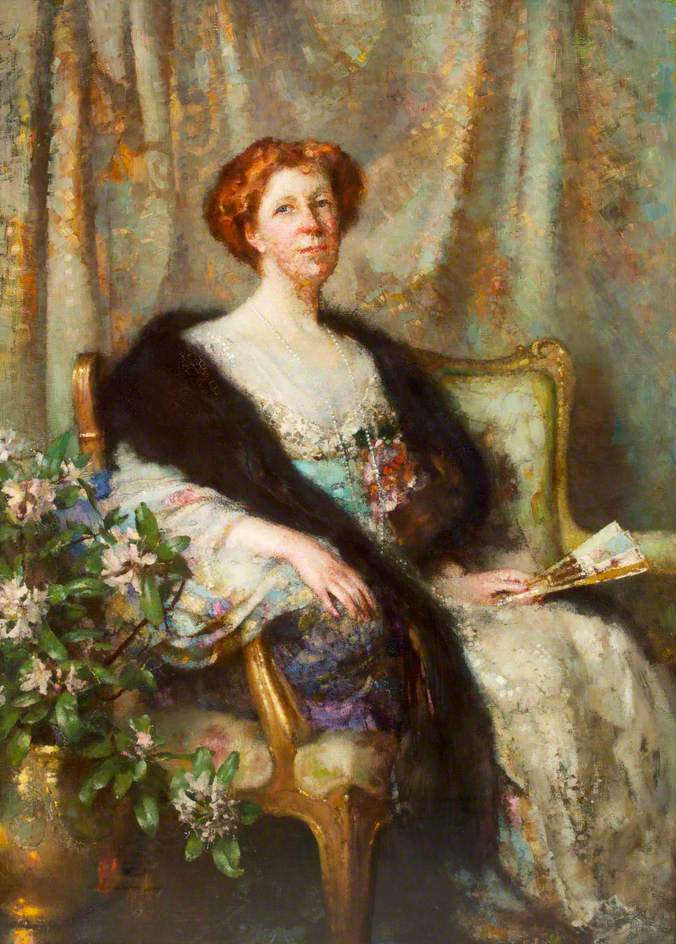
- Portrait of Lady Dixon by Henrietta Rae
- Born: Edith Stewart Clark; 27 February 1871; Paisley, Renfrewshire, Scotland
- Died: 20 January 1964 (aged 92)
- Occupation: Philanthropist

Dame Edith Stewart Dixon, Lady Dixon, DBE (née Clark; 27 February 1871 – 20 January 1964) was a Scottish philanthropist, largely based in Northern Ireland.

Dixon was born in Paisley, Renfrewshire, the daughter of Annie (née Smiley) and Stewart Clark. She married Belfast shipowner, Sir Thomas Dixon, 2nd Baronet on 7 February 1906. The couple donated more than £100,000 to good causes. For this philanthropy, she was appointed Dame Commander of the Order of the British Empire (DBE) in the Honours List for the opening of the Parliament of Northern Ireland in July 1921. Dixon died on 20 January 1964, aged 92, in Malone Park, Belfast. She is buried in Dundonald Cemetery.
