= Mary Peters (athlete) =

British athlete (born 1939)

Lady Mary Peters LG CH DBE
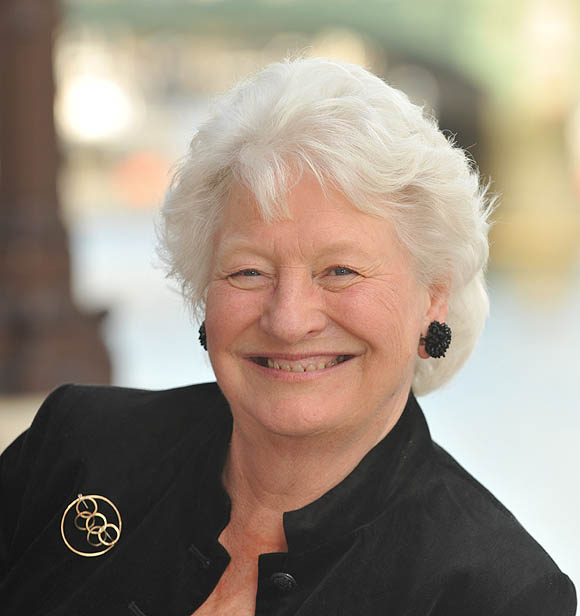
- Peters in 2008

Personal information
- Full name: Mary Elizabeth Peters
- Citizenship: UK
- Born: 6 July 1939 (age 87) Halewood, Liverpool, England
Medal record
Women's athletics
Representing Great Britain
Olympic Games
Gold medal – first place	1972 Munich	Pentathlon
Representing Northern Ireland
Commonwealth Games
Gold medal – first place	1970 Edinburgh	Shot put
Gold medal – first place	1970 Edinburgh	Pentathlon
Gold medal – first place	1974 Christchurch	Pentathlon
Silver medal – second place	1966 Kingston	Shot put

Lady Mary Elizabeth Peters (born 6 July 1939) is a Northern Irish former athlete and athletics administrator. She is best known as the 1972 Olympic champion in the pentathlon, for which she won the BBC Sports Personality of the Year Award. Peters was named as Lady Companion of the Order of the Garter on 27 February 2019. She was installed in St. George's Chapel, the chapel of the Order, on Garter Day, 17 June.

== Early life and education ==
Mary Elizabeth Peters was born on 6 July 1939 in Halewood, Liverpool and attended Hunts Cross primary school, later living at 5 Mere Avenue in Alkrington near Manchester, where she went to primary school.

Peters moved to Ballymena (and later Belfast) at the age of eleven when her father's job was relocated to Northern Ireland. As a teenager, her father encouraged her athletic career by building her home practice facilities as birthday gifts. She qualified as a teacher and worked while training.

== Athletics career ==
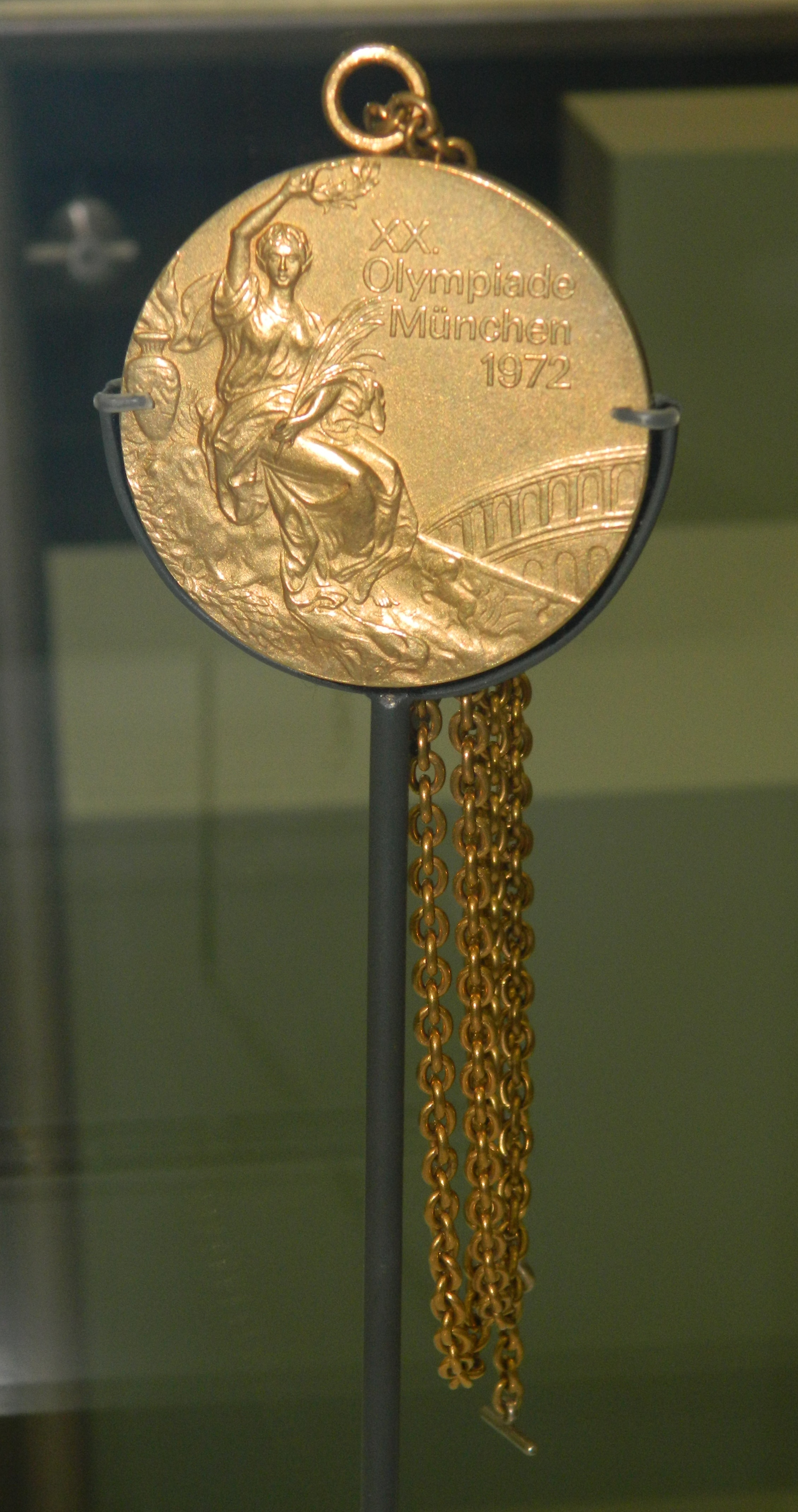
Peters' Women's Pentathlon gold medal, Munich Summer Olympics 1972

After Ballymena, the family moved to Portadown where she attended Portadown College. The headmaster Donald Woodman and the PE teacher Kenneth McClelland introduced her to athletics, McClelland being her first coach. She was head girl of the school in 1956.

In the 1972 Summer Olympics in Munich, Peters competing for Great Britain and Northern Ireland and won the gold medal in the women's pentathlon. She had finished 4th in 1964 and 9th in 1968. To win the gold medal, she narrowly beat the local favourite, West Germany's Heide Rosendahl, by 10 points, setting a world record score. After her victory, a death threat was phoned into the BBC by a man with an Irish accent: "Mary Peters is a Protestant and has won a medal for Britain. An attempt will be made on her life and it will be blamed on the IRA ... Her home will be going up in the near future." But Peters insisted she would return home to Belfast. She was greeted by fans and a band at the airport and paraded through the city streets, but was not allowed back in her flat for three months. Turning down jobs in the US and Australia, where her father lived, she insisted on remaining in Northern Ireland.

In 1972, Peters won the BBC Sports Personality of the Year award: "Peters, a 33-year-old secretary from Belfast, won Britain's only athletics gold at the Munich Olympics. The pentathlon competition was decided on the final event, the 200m, and Peters claimed the title by one-tenth of a second."

She represented Northern Ireland at every Commonwealth Games between 1958 and 1974. In these games she won two gold medals for the pentathlon, plus a gold and silver medal for the shot put.

== After athletics ==
Peters became a Trustee of The Outward Bound Trust in May 2001 and is vice-president of the Northern Ireland Outward Bound Association. She is also Patron of Springhill Hospice in Rochdale, Greater Manchester. She now lives in Derriaghy, within the Lisburn and Castlereagh district, just outside Belfast.

== The Mary Peters Trust ==
Peters established a charitable Sports Trust in 1975 (now known as the Mary Peters Trust) to support talented young sportsmen and -women, both able-bodied and disabled, from across Northern Ireland in a financial and advisory capacity. The trust has made a large number of awards, and has a list of well-known alumni that includes Graeme McDowell, Rory McIlroy, Jonathan Rea, Darren Clarke, David Humphreys, Bethany Firth, Ryan Burnett, Carl Frampton, Paddy Barnes, Michael Conlan, Kelly Gallagher and Michael McKillop.

In May 2025, Peters said she was thrilled that her Trust had been assisting young sports people for more than 50 years.

== Honours ==
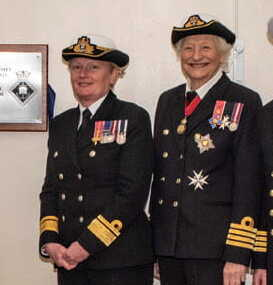
Honorary Captain Peters (right) with Jude Terry, the Royal Navy's first female admiral (2022)

Peters was appointed a Member of the Order of the British Empire (MBE) for services to athletics in the 1973 New Year Honours. For services to sport, she was promoted in the same Order to Commander (CBE) in the 1990 Birthday Honours and again to Dame Commander (DBE) in the 2000 Birthday Honours. In the 2015 New Year Honours, she was awarded as Member of the Order of the Companions of Honour (CH), also for services to sport and the community in Northern Ireland, and in 2017, she was made a Dame of the Order of Saint John (DStJ). Peters was appointed a Lady Companion of the Order of the Garter (LG) on 27 February 2019, and therefore granted the title Lady. She represented the Order at the 2023 coronation.

Northern Ireland's premier athletics track, on the outskirts of Belfast, is named after her. A statue of her stands within it.

In April 2009 she was named the Lord Lieutenant of the City of Belfast; she retired from the post in 2014, being succeeded by Fionnuala Jay-O'Boyle. Peters is a Freeman of the Cities of Lisburn and Belfast.

On 1 August 2012, Peters was made an Honorary Captain in the Royal Naval Reserve.

In June 2026, the Irish Football Association renamed their Community Cup as the Mary Peters Community Cup in her honour.

=== Arms ===
Coat of arms of Mary Peters
Notes Lady Mary was granted armorial bearings along with a badge by the College of Arms. A wooden rendition of her badge has been carved to be placed above her Garter stall in St George's Chapel, in place of the usual wooden crest that appears above men's stalls. Crest None Motto Fortiter Et Humaniter (lit. With courage and courtesy) Orders The Order of the Garter ribbon Badge of the Order of the British Empire; Badge of the Order of the Companions of Honour; Badge of the Order of St John Banner The banner of the Lady Mary Peters's arms used as a lady of the Garter depicted at St George's Chapel. Badge A Ulysses butterfly on the dome of Belfast City Hall proper. Symbolism The red and blue of the shield echo the Union Flag – under which Peters competed in the Olympic Games. The five interlaced rings in the centre symbolise her Olympic past, being a symbol of the International Olympic Committee. The significance of the circlet of ten oak trees is threefold. First, they recall her father who always referred to a large oak tree in Australia, his country of residence, as "his little bit of England". Second, Peters lives in Derriaghy, from the Irish Doire Achaidh, "oakwood of the field". Finally, ten oak trees were planted in her honour at the Mary Peters track as a gift after retiring as Lord Lieutenant of Belfast. For the supporters, the Springer Spaniel is included because of her family's love of the breed. The red and white roses around the dog's neck are symbols of Lancashire and Yorkshire respectively, which refer to the origin of her grandparents. Meanwhile, the liver bird supporter signifies Liverpool, her birth town. The collar of flax flowers signifies Northern Ireland. The bird's torch is the Olympic flame which is also a pun on the 'burn' in Lisburn, a place where she has the Freedom of the City. Additionally, it denotes the Mary Peters Trust, which uses a torch in its logo. Her badge is composed of the dome of Belfast City Hall, to recognise her freedom of Belfast. Atop the dome is a Ulysses butterfly which represents her brother who is knowledgeable about butterflies. Her motto is taken from the school she attended, Portadown College, which Peters telephoned to receive permission for its use.

Honorary titles
Preceded by Lady Carswell	Lord Lieutenant of Belfast; 9 August 2009 – 6 July 2014	Succeeded by Fionnuala Jay-O'Boyle
