= Lord Lieutenant of Belfast =

Ceremonial officer in Belfast, Northern Ireland

- Coat of arms of Belfast

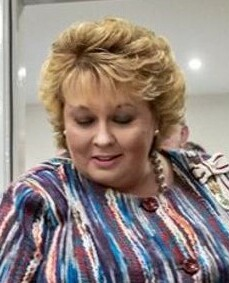
- Incumbent; Dame Fionnuala Jay-O'Boyle since 6 July 2014
- Appointer: King Charles III
- Inaugural holder: The 6th Marquess of Londonderry
- Formation: 1900
- Website: belfastlieutenancy.org.uk

The Lord Lieutenant of Belfast is the official representative of The King for the 'County Borough of Belfast', Northern Ireland. The current Lord Lieutenant is Dame Fionnuala Mary Jay-O'Boyle, who was appointed in July 2014. The position was first created in 1900 and was held by The 6th Marquess of Londonderry. The role is largely honorary with the few formal duties relating to liaising with the King's private office in the lead up to visits to the City regarding issues of local concern and the presentation of awards on behalf of the King. The High Sheriff of Belfast is theoretically the King's judicial representative in the city, while the Lord Lieutenant is the Sovereign's personal representative.

== List of Lord Lieutenants ==
- Charles Vane-Tempest-Stewart, 6th Marquess of Londonderry: 20 February 1900 – 1904
- Anthony Ashley-Cooper, 9th Earl of Shaftesbury: 19 January 1904 – 1911
- William Pirrie, 1st Viscount Pirrie: 4 November 1911 – 6 June 1924
- Sir Thomas Dixon, 2nd Baronet: 7 July 1924 – 10 May 1950
- Daniel Dixon, 2nd Baron Glentoran: 11 July 1950 – 1985
- Sir Robin Kinahan: 12 August 1985 – 1991
- Colonel James Wilson: 25 March 1991 – 2000
- Romayne Carswell, Lady Carswell: 26 May 2000 – 8 August 2009
- Dame Mary Peters: 9 August 2009 – 6 July 2014
- Dame Fionnuala Jay-O'Boyle: since 6 July 2014

== Deputy lieutenants ==
A deputy lieutenant of Belfast is commissioned by the Lord Lieutenant of Belfast. Deputy lieutenants support the work of the lord-lieutenant. There can be several deputy lieutenants at any time, depending on the population of the county. Their appointment does not terminate with the changing of the lord-lieutenant, but they usually retire at age 75.

=== 21st Century ===
- 28 October 2003: Lady Mary Peters
- 9 March 2005: Jennifer Campbell
- 30 October 2007: Dorota Iwaniec
- 21 February 2009: Joseph Corbett
- 28 June 2017: Mark Sheridan

== See also ==
- Belfast City Council
