= Thomas Jackson (architect) =

Irish architect (1807–1890)

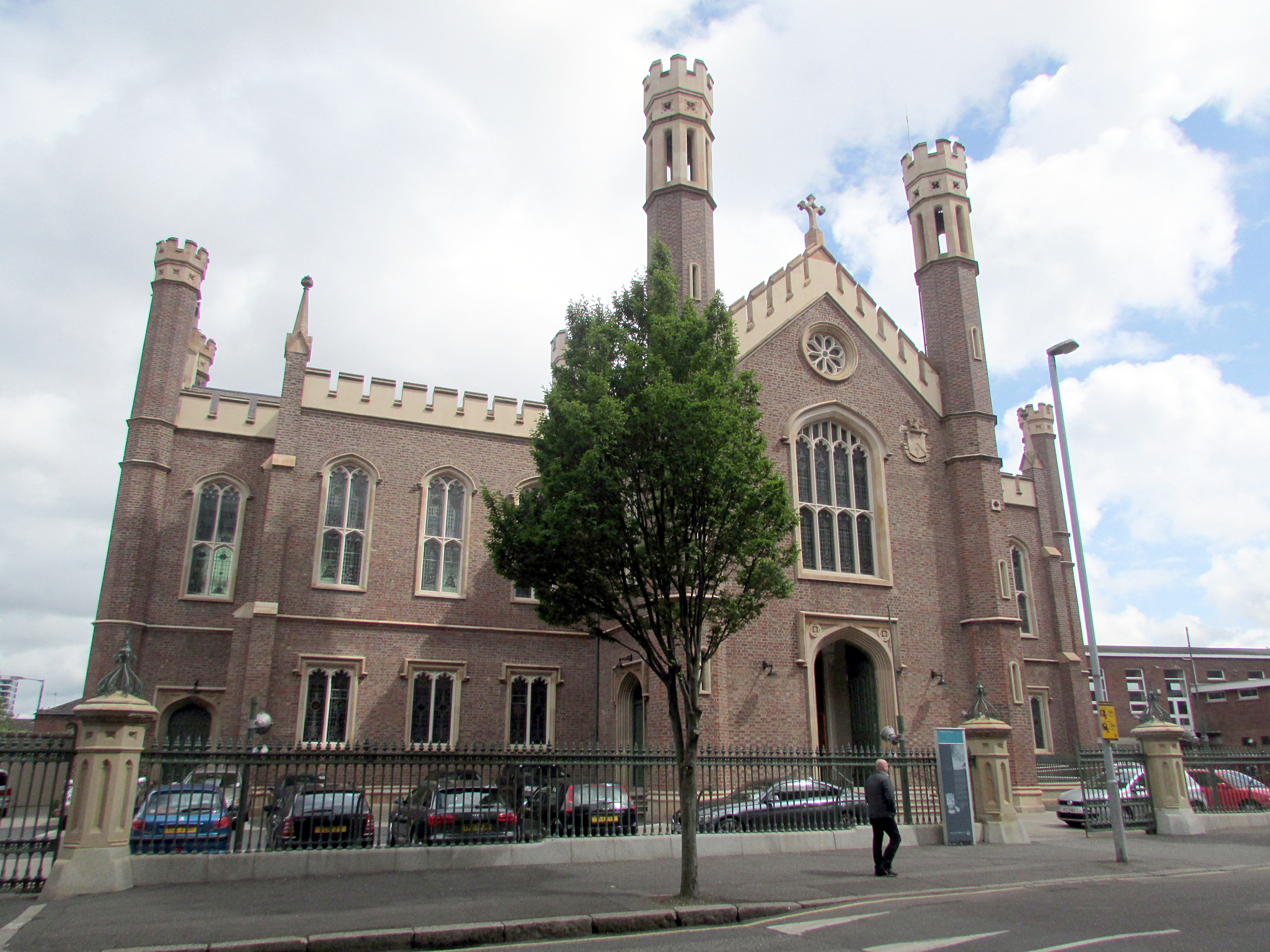
- St Malachy's Church, Belfast
- Born: 1807; Waterford, Ireland
- Died: 1890 (aged 82–83)
- Occupation: Architect
- Practice: Thomas Jackson & Sons
- Buildings: Belfast Hospital for Sick Children

Thomas Jackson (1807–1890) was a 19th-century Irish architect who contributed to the iconic baroque look of Belfast. He was described as being the foremost Belfast architect of his day.

== Early life ==
Thomas Jackson was born in the city of Waterford, Ireland, in 1807. His parents were Anthony Jackson and Elizabeth Pim, both practising Quakers. In fact, Thomas Jackson's great-great-great Grandfather was in attendance during the very first Irish Quaker meeting of 1654. Thomas Jackson would later contribute to the local Quaker movement by designing many of the Friends meeting houses in Northern Ireland.

Jackson married Lydia Newsom Ridgeway, another member of the Waterford Quaker community, on New Year's Day 1835. Together they produced two children; Anthony Thomas Jackson and William Ridgeway Jackson.

== Career ==
Thomas Jackson served his early apprenticeship with George Dymond of Bristol, England. In 1829, he moved to Ulster to work in partnership with Thomas Duff of Newry. He was in charge of Duff's newly established Belfast branch office. He kept this role until 1835 before striking out on his own. Thomas's most recognised work from this period was the Old Museum building for the Belfast Natural History and Philosophical Socitety, of which he was an Honorary member.

Around 1840 Jackson returned briefly to Waterford, the city of his birth, to design a new bank at 31 O'Connell Street. The bank was completed in around 1845.It remained a financial institution for well over a century before becoming offices. In April 2020 it reopened as the Waterford Gallery of Art.

Around 1867, Thomas Jackson's sons joined him, operating under the name Thomas Jackson & Sons. Anthony left to pursue his own interests circa 1870. William stayed on for roughly another ten years before emigrating to Australia. Thomas Jackson produced very little architectural work in the years following Williams departure.

Jackson was fundamentally a residential architect, but over the course of his career he turned his hand to commercial, educational, industrial and ecclesiastical buildings. An example of his domestic work would be the ambitious Cliftonville development. He was the principal architect of Ulster Bank and of the Banbridge, Lisburn & Belfast Junction Railway.

== Notable works ==
Thomas Jackson was personally credited with 114 designs in total. The following are good examples of work by Thomas Jackson and his sons:

- Arnotts Warehouse, Belfast
- Belfast Hospital for Sick Children
- Clifton Villas, Belfast
- Craigavon House
- Glenmachon House, Belfast
- Graymount House, Belfast
- Natural History Museum, Belfast
- St. George's Building, Belfast
- St. Malachy's Church, Belfast
- Quaker Bank, 31 O'Connell Street, Waterford (now the Waterford Gallery of Art)

== Gallery ==
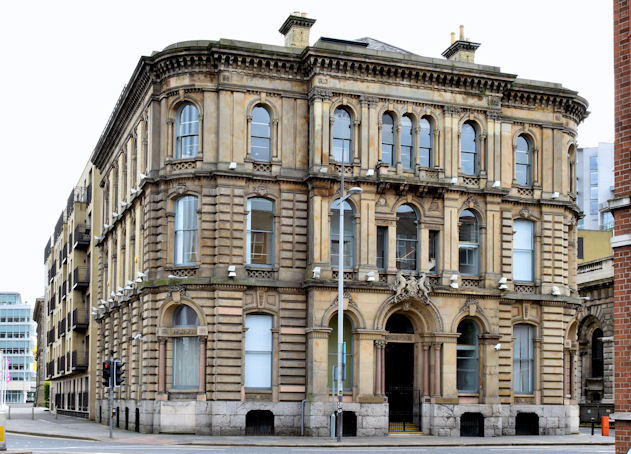
Scottish Amicable building, Belfast

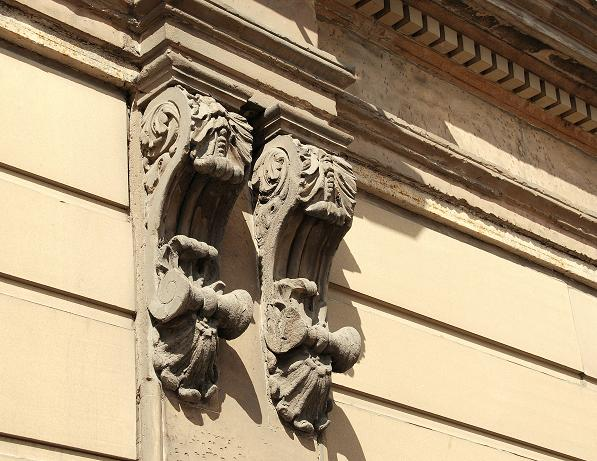
Detailing from the Corn Exchange, Belfast

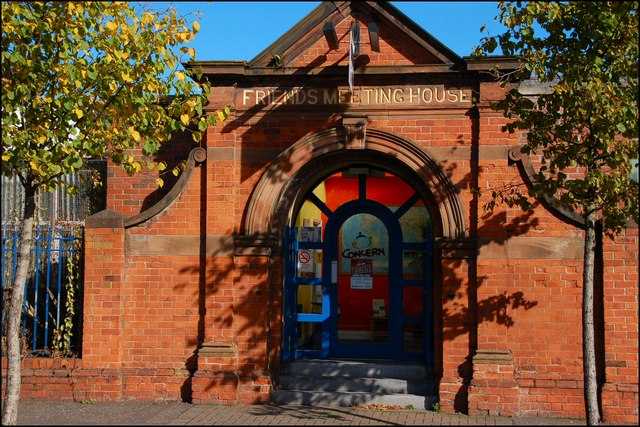
Former Frederick Street Quaker Meeting House, Belfast

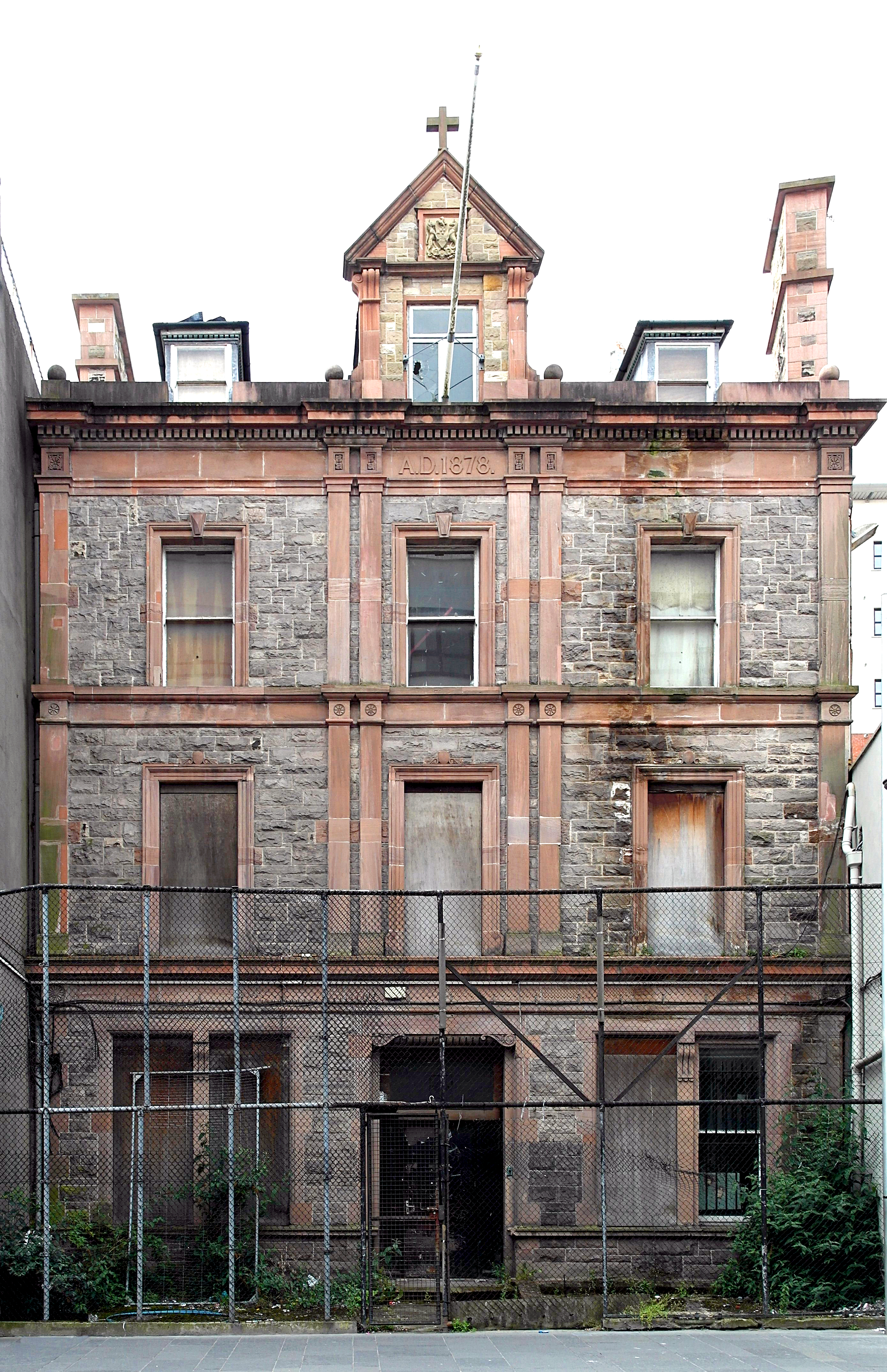
Belfast Hospital for Sick Children

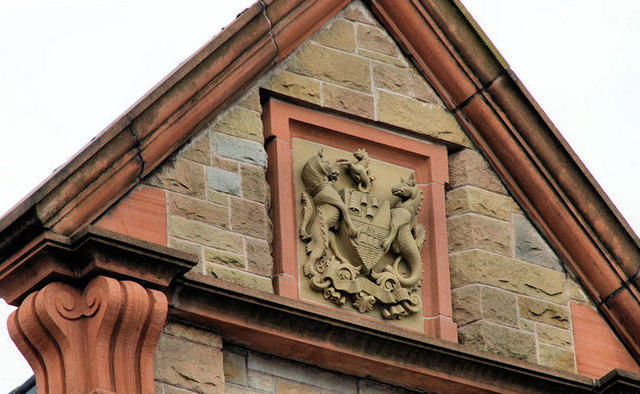
Detailing from Belfast Hospital for Sick Children

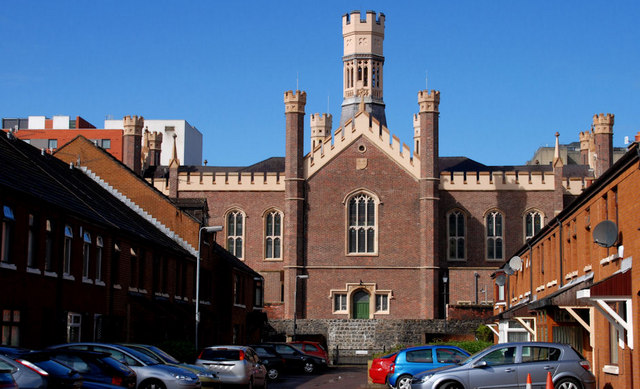
St Malachy's Church, Belfast

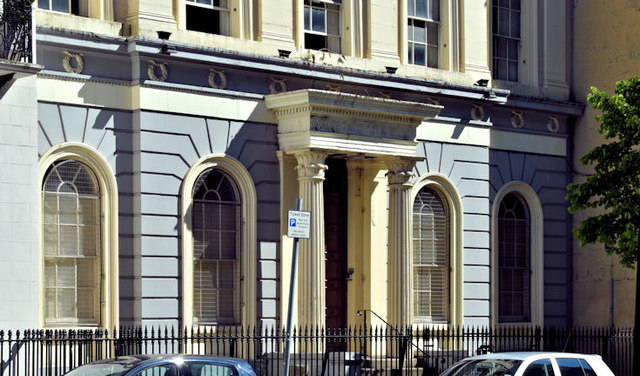
Old Museum, Belfast

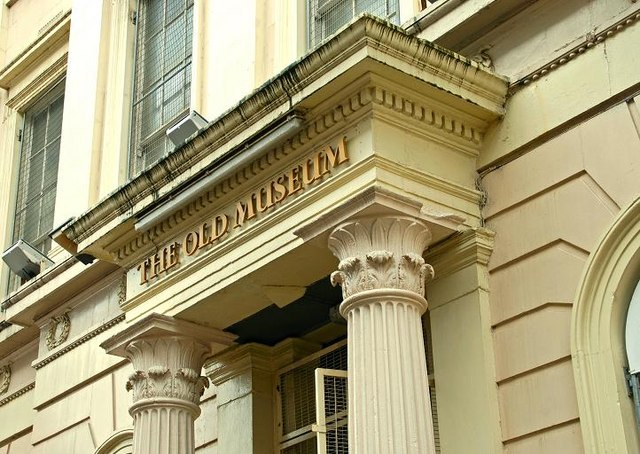
Detailing from Old Museum, Belfast

== Portfolio ==
NB: Some omissions due to lack of descriptive information.

Extensive list of designs attributed to Thomas Jackson –
- CO. ANTRIM, ANTRIM, MARKET SQUARE, ULSTER BANK – 1886
- CO. ANTRIM, BALLYMENA, BRIDGE STREET, LINEN WEAVING FACTORY (BRAID WATER FLAX SPINNING CO.) – Circa 1866
- CO. ANTRIM, BALLYMENA, DIOCESAN SCHOOLS – 1863
- CO. ANTRIM, BALLYMENA, FLAX MILL (BRAID WATER FLAX SPINNING CO.) – 1866
- CO. ANTRIM, BALLYMENA, GALGORM ROAD, MOUNT PLEASANT (KNOCKANURE) – 1856
- CO. ANTRIM, BALLYMENA, GEORGE STREET, ULSTER BANK
- CO. ANTRIM, BALLYMENA, HIGH STREET, UNITARIAN MEETING HOUSE – 1845
- CO. ANTRIM, BALLYMENA, HOUSE
- CO. ANTRIM, BALLYMENA, MOUNT PLEASANT, KNOCKABURE – Circa 1856
- CO. ANTRIM, BALLYMONEY, ULSTER BANK – Circa 1861
- CO. ANTRIM, BELFAST, ACADEMY STREET, ACADEMY (PROPOSED) – 1841
- CO. ANTRIM, BELFAST, ALFRED STREET, FLAX FACTORY & WAREHOUSE (LEADBETTER'S) – 1852
- CO. ANTRIM, BELFAST, ALFRED STREET, ST MALACHY'S CHURCH (RC) – 1840
- CO. ANTRIM, BELFAST, ASHLEY PL
- CO. ANTRIM, BELFAST, BALLYMACARRETT, SCHOOL – 1866
- CO. ANTRIM, BELFAST, BALLYMISCAW ROAD, TWESKARD
- CO. ANTRIM, BELFAST, BRIDGE STREET, NO. 012-16 (ARNOTT) – 1866
- CO. ANTRIM, BELFAST, BRIDGE STREET, PREMISES – 1858
- CO. ANTRIM, BELFAST, CASTLE PLACE, NO. 020-22 (CANTRELL) – 1866
- CO. ANTRIM, BELFAST, CLIFTONVILLE, CLIFTONVILLE COTTAGE – Circa 1835
- CO. ANTRIM, BELFAST, CLIFTONVILLE – Circa 1830
- CO. ANTRIM, BELFAST, CLIFTONVILLE ROAD, NO. 026-30 (HOME FOR THE BLIND) – Circa 1831
- CO. ANTRIM, BELFAST, CLONARD GARDENS, CLONARD HOUSE – 1843
- CO. ANTRIM, BELFAST, COLLEGE SQUARE EAST, ACADEMICAL INSTITUTION – 1874
- CO. ANTRIM, BELFAST, COLLEGE SQUARE NORTH, MUSEUM (OLD) – Circa 1830
- CO. ANTRIM, BELFAST, COLLEGE STREET, REFORMED PRESBYTERIAN CHURCH (OLD) – 1843
- CO. ANTRIM, BELFAST, CORPORATION STREET (& GREEN STREET), WAREHOUSE (PATTERSON) – Circa 1867
- CO. ANTRIM, BELFAST, CORPORATION STREET, WAREHOUSE – Circa 1853
- CO. ANTRIM, BELFAST, CUPAR STREET, FLAX SPINNING MILL (J. & T.M. GREEVES)
- CO. ANTRIM, BELFAST, DERRYVOLGIE AVENUE, NO. 008
- CO. ANTRIM, BELFAST, DERRYVOLGIE AVENUE, NO. 008 (TIGHNABRUAICH) – 1880
- CO. ANTRIM, BELFAST, DONEGALL PLACE, NO. 001-5 (ANDERSON & MCAULEY)
- CO. ANTRIM, BELFAST, DONEGALL PLACE, NO. 27 (ROYAL HOTEL) – Circa 1849
- CO. ANTRIM, BELFAST, FALLS ROAD, GUNNING & CAMPBELL MILLS
- CO. ANTRIM, BELFAST, FALLS ROAD, NORTHERN SPINNING CO. – 1867
- CO. ANTRIM, BELFAST, FORTHRIVER, FLAX SPINNING MILL (J. & T.M. GREEVES)
- CO. ANTRIM, BELFAST, FOUNTAIN STREET, HALL – 1889
- CO. ANTRIM, BELFAST, FREDERICK STREET, QUAKER MEETING HOUSE – 1840
- CO. ANTRIM, BELFAST, GLENBANK SPINNING MILLS
- CO. ANTRIM, BELFAST, GLENMACHAN ROAD, ALTONA – 1864
- CO. ANTRIM, BELFAST, GLENMACHAN ROAD, GLENMACHAN TOWER – 1862
- CO. ANTRIM, BELFAST, GLENMACHAN ROAD AREA, HOUSE (GLEN EBOR) – 1862
- CO. ANTRIM, BELFAST, GRAY'S LANE, GRAYMOUNT – Circa 1835
- CO. ANTRIM, BELFAST, HIGH STREET, FORSTER GREEN & CO. – Circa 1865
- CO. ANTRIM, BELFAST, HOLYWOOD ROAD, RICHMOND LODGE – Circa 1845
- CO. ANTRIM, BELFAST, LISBURN ROAD, ROYAL TERRACE – 1848
- CO. ANTRIM, BELFAST, MALONE ROAD, NO. 071 (BERTHA) – 1853
- CO. ANTRIM, BELFAST, MAY STREET, MUSIC HALL – 1840
- CO. ANTRIM, BELFAST, MOUNT CHARLES, NO. 002 & 4 – 1842
- CO. ANTRIM, BELFAST, OLD HOLYWOOD ROAD, HEIDELBERG
- CO. ANTRIM, BELFAST, OLD HOLYWOOD ROAD, LISMACHAN
- CO. ANTRIM, BELFAST, QUEEN'S ELMS – 1859
- CO. ANTRIM, BELFAST, ROYAL AVENUE, NO. 103-107 (EAGLE CHAMBERS) – Circa 1883
- CO. ANTRIM, BELFAST, SCHOOLS – 1872
- CO. ANTRIM, BELFAST, SPRINGFIELD
- CO. ANTRIM, BELFAST, STRANDTOWN, SCHOMBERG
- CO. ANTRIM, BELFAST, UNIVERSITY ROAD, ELMWOOD TERRACE – 1858
- CO. ANTRIM, BELFAST, UNIVERSITY SQUARE, NO. 004-30 – Circa 1848
- CO. ANTRIM, BELFAST, VICTORIA STREET, NO. 001-7 (CORN EXCHANGE) – 1851
- CO. ANTRIM, BELFAST, VICTORIA STREET, NO. 010-14 (SCOTTISH AMICABLE LIFE ASSURANCE CO) – 1863
- CO. ANTRIM, BELFAST, WARING STREET, NO. 012 (W.H. SMITH) – 1878
- CO. ANTRIM, BELFAST, WARING STREET, NO. 035-39 (ULSTER BANK) – 1859;1869;1873
- CO. ANTRIM, BELFAST, WILMONT
- CO. ANTRIM, BELFAST, WINDSOR AVENUE, NO. 046 (CEARA) – 1854
- CO. ANTRIM, BELFAST, YORK STREET, SPINNING MILLS
- CO. ANTRIM, CARRICKFERGUS, HOUSES (003) – Circa 1844
- CO. ANTRIM, CARRICKFERGUS, TAYLOR'S AVENUE, BARN FLAX SPINNING MILLS
- CO. ANTRIM, GREENISLAND, SEAPARK HOUSE, VICTORIAN TURKISH BATHS
- CO. ANTRIM, LISBURN, LISNAVARVEY
- CO. ANTRIM, LISBURN, LISSUE
- CO. ANTRIM, LISBURN, RAILWAY STREET, QUAKER MEETING HOUSE – 1853
- CO. ANTRIM, LONGWOOD (NEWTOWNABBEY)
- CO. ANTRIM, MERVILLE (CARNMONEY)
- CO. ANTRIM?, OLD FORGE
- CO. ARMAGH, GOSFORD CASTLE (MARKETHILL) – Circa 1852
- CO. ARMAGH, LURGAN, HIGH STREET, HOUSES (2) – 1837
- CO. ARMAGH, LURGAN, HOUSE
- CO. ARMAGH, LURGAN, SILVERWOOD – 1840
- CO. ARMAGH, PORTADOWN, STRAMORE
- CO. CORK, CORK, HOUGHTON
- CO. DOWN, BANBRIDGE, GAS WORKS – 1851
- CO. DOWN, BANBRIDGE, RAILWAY STATION – 1861
- CO. DOWN, CRAIGAVAD, HOUSE (AILSA LODGE?) – Circa 1875
- CO. DOWN, DOWNPATRICK, INSTITUTE – 1841
- CO. DOWN, DOWNPATRICK, IRISH STREET (& MARKET STREET), ULSTER BANK – 1854
- CO. DOWN, DROMORE, RAILWAY STATION – 1861
- CO. DOWN, HILLSBOROUGH, BARRACK STORE – 1870
- CO. DOWN, HILLSBOROUGH, RAILWAY STATION – 1861
- CO. DOWN, MULLAGHFERNAN, RAILWAY STATION – 1861
- CO. FERMANAGH, ENNISKILLEN, DARLING STREET, ULSTER BANK – 1875
- CO. FERMANAGH, LISNASKEA, ULSTER BANK – 1872
- CO. LIMERICK, LIMERICK, CECIL STREET, QUAKER MEETING HOUSE – 1806
- CO. LONDONDERRY, DERRY, WATERLOO PLACE, ULSTER BANK – 1858
- CO. LONDONDERRY, MAGHERA, ULSTER BANK – 1866
- CO. MONAGHAN, CARRICKMACROSS, MAIN STREET, ULSTER BANK – 1873
- CO. MONAGHAN, CARRICKMACROSS, MAIN STREET, ULSTER BANK – 1873
- CO. TYRONE, BERNAGH (DUNGANNON) – Circa 1850
- CO. TYRONE, CASTLEDERG, MAIN STREET, ULSTER BANK – 1866
- CO. TYRONE, COOKSTOWN, WILLIAM STREET, ULSTER BANK – 1852
- CO. TYRONE, OMAGH, JAMES STREET, RAILWAY STATION – 1861
- CO. TYRONE, STRABANE, ABERCORN SQUARE, ULSTER BANK – 1861
- CO. TYRONE, TAMNAMORE (DUNGANNON), HOUSE
- CO. TYRONE, TULLYLAGAN, HOUSE
- CO. WATERFORD, WATERFORD, MORGAN STREET & MILITARY ROAD), BACON CURING FACTORY
- CO. WATERFORD, WATERFORD, O'CONNELL STREET, SAVINGS BANK – Circa 1840
- CO. WATERFORD, WATERFORD, ROCKVILLE

== Bibliography ==
- James Stevens Curl, 'A Dictionary of Architecture and Landscape Architecture'. ISBN 9780198606789
- Hugh Dixon, 'Honouring Thomas Jackson (1807–1890)'. British Natural History and Philosophical Society Journal.
- Paul Larmour, 'A hive of activity (Thomas Jackson 1807–1890)'. QUB Perspective Journal.
