= Ulster Architectural Heritage Society =

Ulster Architectural Heritage
- Ulster Architectural Heritage Society
- Abbreviation: UAH
- Formation: 1967; 59 years ago
- Purpose: To promote the historic environment, its protection, conservation and heritage-led regeneration for people and communities
- Headquarters: Old Museum Building
- Location: Belfast, Northern Ireland
- Region served: Officially serves the entire province of Ulster but operates primarily in Northern Ireland
- Chairman: Dr David Johnston OBE
- Website: ulsterarchitecturalheritage.org.uk

Ulster Architectural Heritage Society was founded "to promote appreciation and enjoyment of good architecture of all periods and encourage the conservation, restoration and re-use of Ulster's built heritage to regenerate and sustain our communities".

== History ==
It was founded in 1967, mainly under the impetus of Sir Charles Brett, to counter threats to the survival of Ulster's historic architecture. When the UAHS was founded there was no statutory listing of buildings in Northern Ireland and its campaigns led to the establishment of listed building legislation for Northern Ireland in 1972. Subsequently, historic buildings grants, conservation areas and a public buildings record were all developed under the auspices of the Department of the Environment (Northern Ireland), in no small part due to the UAHS.

The UAHS along with the Charles Brett and the National Trust, later established Hearth Historic Buildings Trust in 1972.

== Campaigns ==
In February 2015 it was reported that the Department of the Environment proposed delisting 17 Belfast buildings, including the historic Kelly's Cellars, subject to review by the Historic Buildings Council and Belfast City Council. UAHS declared that "despite their present condition, all buildings currently proposed for delisting contribute to the value of Belfast’s fragile built heritage and are important resources to promote tourism, economic investment and social regeneration". In March 2015 Belfast city councillors vowed to fight the Department of Environment over plans to remove protective listed status from Kelly's Cellars, now one of eight properties which the department has indicated that it plans to delist.

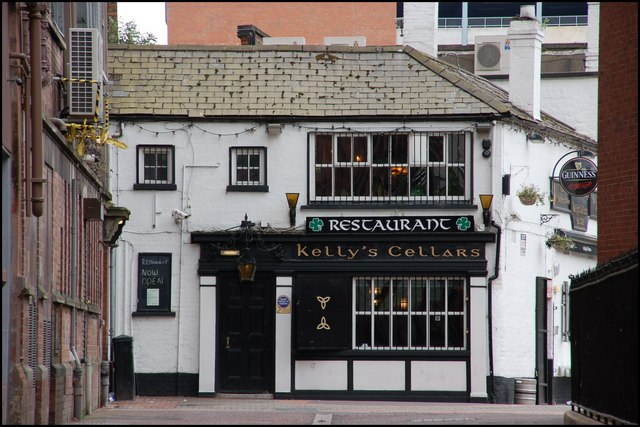
Kelly's Cellars, Belfast, in 2007

== Heritage at Risk Register Northern Ireland (HARNI) ==
The Heritage at Risk Register NI (HARNI) is a partnership between Ulster Architectural Heritage and the Historic Environment Division (HED) of the Department for Communities. The primary aims of the HARNI project are to record architecturally and historically important buildings that appear to be at risk, and act as a catalyst for conservation and re-use of built heritage at risk. Since 1993, UAH, the Department for Communities (and its predecessor, the Department of the Environment) have, through the project, provided help and advice for existing owners who may wish to engage upon a suitable scheme of maintenance, and offered assistance to potential owners that may be interested in restoring an at-risk building.

As of 2023 there are 1039 buildings on the register, of which 822 are listed buildings.
