= Sir Thomas Dixon, 2nd Baronet =

Northern Ireland politician

Sir Thomas James Dixon, 2nd Baronet, PC (NI) (29 May 1868 – 10 May 1950), was a Northern Ireland politician.

Dixon was the eldest son of Sir Daniel Dixon, 1st Baronet, Lord Mayor of Belfast, and his wife, Eliza (née Agnew). He succeeded his father as second Baronet in 1907. Dixon was a Member of the Senate of Northern Ireland from 1924 to 1950, and was admitted to the Privy Council of Northern Ireland in 1931. He served as High Sheriff of Antrim in 1912, and of County Down in 1913. He was Lord Lieutenant of Belfast between 1924 and 1950.

Dixon married Edith Stewart Clark on 7 February 1906. He died in May 1950, aged 81, and was succeeded in the baronetcy by his younger brother Herbert, who had already been elevated to the peerage as Baron Glentoran. He is buried in Dundonald Cemetery.

In 1919, Dixon purchased Wilmont House and its estates in Belfast for £21,500. Lady Dixon was appointed Dame Commander of the Order of the British Empire (DBE) for her services during World War I.

== Legacy ==
Sir Thomas and Lady Dixon Park opened the same year.

== Sources ==
- Kidd, Charles, Williamson, David (editors). Debrett's Peerage and Baronetage (1990 edition). New York: St Martin's Press, 1990.
- Leigh Rayment's list of baronets

Honorary titles
Preceded by The Viscount Pirrie	Lord Lieutenant of Belfast; 1924–1950	Succeeded by Daniel Dixon
Baronetage of the United Kingdom
Preceded by Daniel Dixon	Baronet (of Ballymenock); 1907–1950	Succeeded by Herbert Dixon
