= Hearth Historic Buildings Trust =

Heritage and housing organisation in Belfast, Northern Ireland

- Formation: 1972; 54 years ago
- Founder: Charles Brett; Ulster Architectural Heritage Society; National Trust
- Founded at: Belfast
- Type: Registered society
- Headquarters: The Old Museum, 7 College Square North, Belfast BT1 6AS
- Origins: Co-operative and Community Benefit Societies Act (Northern Ireland) 1969
- Services: Architectural conservation and housing
- Chairman: Alastair Rankin
- Key people: Charles Brett
- Website: hearthni.org.uk
- Formerly called: Historic Environmental and Architectural Rehabilitation Trust for Housing (HEARTH); Hearth Revolving Fund

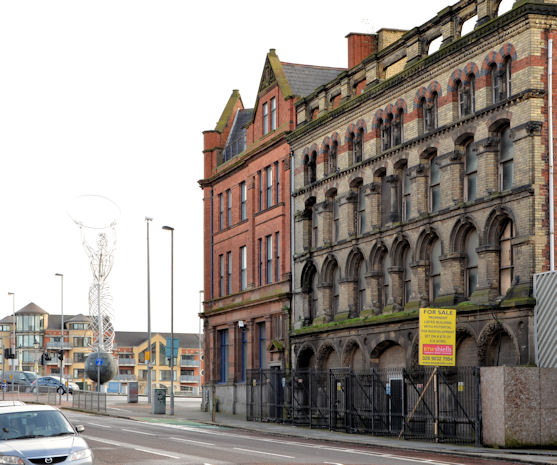
Riddel's warehouse in 2014.

The Hearth Historic Buildings Trust is an architectural heritage, conservation and housing organisation which operates in Northern Ireland and is headquartered in Belfast.

== History ==
The organisation was established as a joint initiative by the National Trust and the Ulster Architectural Heritage Society (UAH) in 1972 and named the Historic Environmental and Architectural Rehabilitation Trust for Housing (HEARTH). It was established following the passing of the Co-operative and Community Benefit Societies Act (Northern Ireland) 1969.

In 1991, the organisation changed its name to the Hearth Revolving Fund to reflect its model of restoring properties and selling them to fund further projects. In 2017, the name was officially changed to Hearth Historic Buildings Trust.

It restored almost forty buildings across its history. Charles Brett was the organisation's inaugural chairman. As of September 2026, recent notable projects include ongoing works on restoring Riddel's Warehouse in Belfast.

== Hearth Housing Association ==
From 1978 to 2016, the Hearth committee established and ran its own sister charity, Hearth Housing Association which restored at least 100 houses. In 2016, Hearth Housing Association merged with Clanmil Housing Association and became its heritage housing division.

== See also ==
- Historic Buildings Council of Northern Ireland
