= Sir George Clark, 1st Baronet =

George Smith Clark
- Born: 8 November 1861; Paisley, Scotland
- Died: 23 March 1935 (aged 73); Belfast, Northern Ireland
- Resting place: Belfast City Cemetery
- Education: Merchiston Castle School
- Occupation: Shipbuilder
- Years active: 1877–1935
- Partner: Frances Elizabeth Matier
- Children: Sir George Clark, 2nd Baronet (1882–1950); Henry Douglas Clark (1889–1952)

Sir George Smith Clark, 1st Baronet, DL (8 November 1861 – 23 March 1935) was a businessman and politician in Northern Ireland. George S. Clark was born in Paisley, Scotland the second son of thread manufacturer James Clark, and Jane Smith; both his parents were Scottish Presbyterians.

== Early life ==
Clark was educated at Merchiston Castle School, Edinburgh. He was apprenticed to Harland and Wolff in Belfast and, in 1877, opened his own shipyard on the river Lagan with Frank Workman. Clark's mother's brother, George Smith, was able to provide capital for this initial venture. In 1891 the firm became Workman, Clark and Company. During the First World War the shipyard concentrated on Admiralty work and it was for this that, in 1917, Clark received the Baronetcy of Dunlambert.

=== Personal life ===
In 1881 Clark married Frances Matier, and became a director of her family's linen firm; Henry Matier & Co. The couple had two sons. The family hosted computing pioneer Dora Metcalf in Belfast when she was introducing comptometery machines into the shipyards in 1916.

== A leading Belfast Unionist ==
In a 1907 by-election he became Member of Parliament for North Belfast, retiring in 1910 to devote more attention to his business affairs. In 1913 the Workman Clark shipyard had assisted the UVF with the Larne gun running campaign encouraged by Sir Edward Carson. In 1925 Clark became a Unionist Senator in the Northern Ireland parliament. He remained in this position until his death at his home, Dunlambert, Fortwilliam Park, Belfast, on 23 March 1935. He also served as a Deputy Lieutenant and director of the Bank of Ireland.

=== Death and legacy ===
He was buried on 26 March in Belfast City Cemetery. The virtues of company law are such that despite the ruin of Workman, Clark & Co. Ltd. Sir George died a millionaire.

Upon his death his son, Sir George Clark, 2nd Baronet, succeeded to the baronetcy; he was a Cambridge-educated naval architect and soldier (d. 1950).

== Arms ==
Coat of arms of Sir George Clark, 1st Baronet

Notes
Granted 1 June 1920 by George James Burtchaell, Deputy Ulster King of Arms.
Crest
A demi-hunstman Proper habited Argent blowing a horn Or.
Torse
Of the colours
Escutcheon
Barry wavy of four Argent and Azure a galley with sail net and flags flying all Or on a chief of the second a thistle slipped with two leaves between two noses of the third.
Motto
Free For A Blast

Parliament of the United Kingdom
Preceded by Sir Daniel Dixon, Bt	Member of Parliament for Belfast North; 1907 – January 1910	Succeeded by Robert Thompson
Baronetage of the United Kingdom
New creation	Baronet (of Dunlambert); 1917–1935	Succeeded by George Clark
