= Building preservation trust =

Type of heritage charity in the United Kingdom

A building preservation trust (BPT) is an organisation whose main aims include the preservation and regeneration of historic buildings. BPTs normally have charitable status.

There are around 300 BPTs in the United Kingdom and their scope ranges from national to the preservation of an individual building or type of building. Trusts that work on a number of simultaneous or successive projects are known as revolving fund trusts. A register of revolving trusts is maintained by the Architectural Heritage Fund.

The Heritage Trust Network acts as a representative body for all not for profit built heritage groups, including BPTs, in the U.K.

== See also ==
- Building Preservation and Conservation Trusts in the UK
