= William McCammond =

Irish politician

William McCammond, as Lord Mayor

Sir William McCammond was an Irish Unionist politician who served as Lord Mayor of Belfast between 1894 and 1896. He was knighted in 1895 and died in 1898. McCammond was active in trying to resolve the Belfast and Clyde shipbuilders' crisis of 1895 .

== Arms ==
Coat of arms of William McCammond

Notes
Granted by Sir John Bernard Burke, Ulster King of Arms, on 20 December 1895.
Crest
Out of a mural crown a lion's head Gules charged on the neck with a bell Argent.
Escutcheon
Or a fess Vair between three sea horses Proper.
Motto
Justus Ac Tenax

Civic offices
Preceded by Daniel Dixon	Lord Mayor of Belfast; 1894–1896	Succeeded by William James Pirrie
