= List of parks and gardens in Belfast =

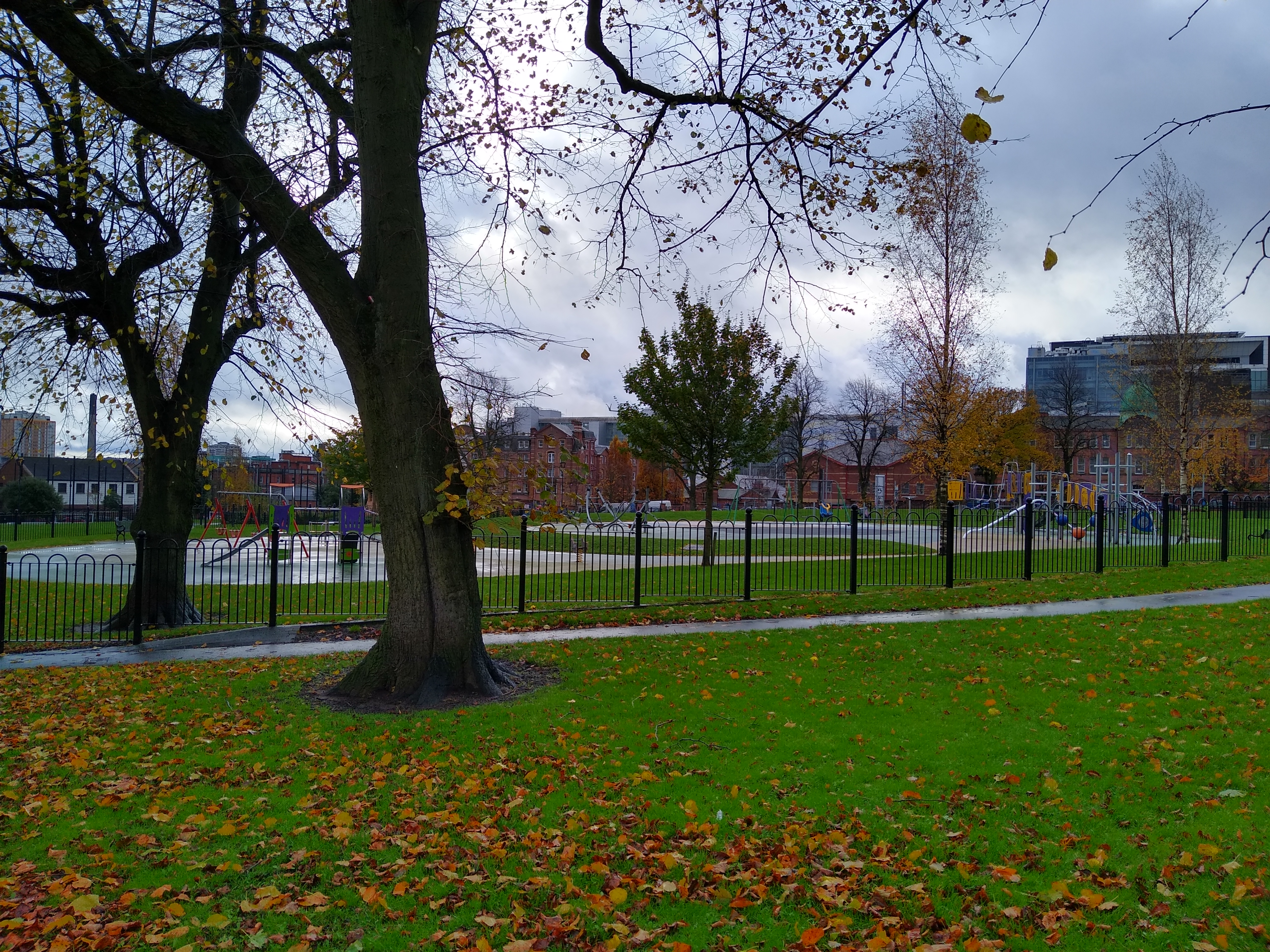
Dunville Park

Belfast, Northern Ireland, has over forty public parks. The Forest of Belfast is a partnership between government and local groups, set up in 1992 to manage and conserve the city's parks and open spaces. They have also commissioned more than 30 public sculptures since 1993. In 2006, the City Council also set aside £8 million to continue this work. The Belfast Naturalists' Field Club was founded in 1863 and is administered by National Museums and Galleries of Northern Ireland.

One of the most popular parks is Botanic Gardens in the Queen's Quarter. Built in the 1830s and designed by Sir Charles Lanyon, Botanic Gardens Palm House is one of the earliest examples of a curvilinear and cast iron glasshouse. Attractions in the park also include the Tropical Ravine, a humid jungle glen built in 1889, rose gardens and public events ranging from live opera broadcasts to pop concerts. U2 played here in 1997 and the Tennents Vital festival takes place in the gardens each summer.

Sir Thomas and Lady Dixon Park, to the south of the city centre, attracts thousands of visitors each year to its International Rose Garden. Rose Week in July each year boasts over 20,000 blooms. It has an area of 128 acres (0.52 km^{2}) of meadows, woodland and gardens and also features a Princess Diana Memorial Garden, a Japanese Garden, a walled garden, and the Golden Crown Fountain commissioned in 2002 as part of the Queen's Golden Jubilee celebrations.

Woodvale Park is traditional City Park, which provides a range of passive and active recreation. The main facilities include Bowling Greens, Soccer pitches, a Kick about area and Play area. A network of paths through rolling lawns, shrubs borders and mature trees link these facilities. Historically Woodvale Park has been one of the main parks for the 26,000 people who make up the Greater Shankill area, due to regeneration in the area the population is increasing.

History

Woodvale Park became Belfast's fourth public park when it opened in 1888. The land was bought by Belfast Corporation from Reverend Glover. He had lived in a house called Woodville that once stood in the park. The park was due to be called Shankill Park, but the name was changed to Woodvale at the last minute. The opening was set for 3.00pm on Saturday 18 August 1888. By 3.35pm the dignitaries had not turned up and so one of the rangers took the key admit the large crowd. The park included a large pond, which was used by local people in wintertime for skating. Cricket was first played in the park in 1894, although the authorities were wary of possible injury to other park users. The pond was filled in after the Second World War and a children's playground established in its place.

== Full list ==
Name of park	Location	Notes
Alexandra Park	near Antrim Road, north Belfast	
Alderman Tommy Patton Memorial Park	Inverary Avenue, Holywood Road, east Belfast	Commonly known as Inverary Playing Fields
Belfast Castle	near Antrim Road, north Belfast	
Barnett Demesne	near Shaw's Bridge, south Belfast	
Belmont Park	Cairnburn Road, east Belfast	Semi-wild
Botanic Gardens	University area, south Belfast	Contains Palm House and Tropical Ravine Botanic station.
Carnanmore Park	near Stewartstown Road, south-west Belfast	
Carmena Allen Memorial Park	Braniel, east Belfast	Better known as Braniel Park or sometimes Sam's Park
Carr's Glen Linear Park	Ballysillan Road, north Belfast	
Cavehill Country Park	near Antrim Road, north Belfast	Two time Green Flag Award winner
City Hall	Donegall Square, central Belfast	
Clarawood Millennium Park	near Knock Road, east Belfast	
Clement Wilson Park	Newforge Lane, south Belfast	
Comber Greenway	East Belfast to Comber	Seven mile cycle route along path of a disused railway
Dover Street Millennium Park	near Shankill Road, west Belfast	
Dr Pitt Memorial Park	Newtownards Road, east Belfast	
Drumglass Park	Lisburn Road, south Belfast	Also called Cranmore or Marlborough Park
Dunville Park	Falls Road, west Belfast	
Falls Park	Falls Road, west Belfast	Facing Milltown cemetery
Finlay Park	Whitewell Road, north Belfast	
Forthriver Park	Ballygomartin Road, west Belfast	
Gasworks	Ormeau Road, south Belfast	Business park
Giant's Park	Dargan Road, north-east Belfast	Proposal for future park
Giant's Ring	Ballynahatty, south Belfast	
Glenbank Park	Ligoniel Road, north-west Belfast	
Glencairn Park	Glencairn Road, west Belfast	
Greenville Park	Grand Parade, Castlereagh Road, east Belfast	
Grovelands	Stockman's Lane, south-west Belfast	
King William Park	near Lisburn Road, south Belfast	one of Belfast's smallest parks
Knocknagoney Linear Park	Holywood Road, east Belfast	
Lagan Meadows	along the River Lagan, south Belfast	partial nature reserve
Lenadoon Millennium Park	near Stewartstown Road, west Belfast	
Ligoniel Park	Ligoniel Road, north-west Belfast	
Loughside Park	Shore Road, north Belfast	
Marrowbone Millennium Park	Oldpark Road, north Belfast	
Michelle Baird Memorial Park	Forthriver Road, west Belfast	
Moat Park	Upper Newtownards Road, East Belfast	Dundonald
Musgrave Park	Stockman's Lane, south-west Belfast	2010 Green Flag Award winner
Northwood Linear Park	Shore Road, north Belfast	
Orangefield Park	Orangefield Lane, East Belfast	
Ormeau Park	Ormeau Road, south Belfast	
Roddens Park	Braniel, east Belfast	Not to be confused with a nearby street with the same name
Sir Thomas and Lady Dixon Park	Upper Malone Road, south Belfast	Annual Rose Week every July
Springhill Millennium Park	Springhill Avenue, Springfield Road, west Belfast	
Springfield Park	Springfield Road, west Belfast	
Victoria Park	Park Avenue near Holywood Road, east Belfast	Contains a lake Near Sydenham station.
Waterworks	between Antrim Road and Cavehill Road, north Belfast	Former source of city's water supply
Woodvale Park	Woodvale Road, upper Shankill, north-west Belfast	
Wedderburn Park	near Lisburn Road, south Belfast	Contains playing fields, bowling green and tennis courts

== See also ==
- List of parks in Northern Ireland
