= Ballynahatty =

Ballynahatty may refer to:

- Ballynahatty, County Down, Northern Ireland
- Ballynahatty, County Tyrone, in County Tyrone, Northern Ireland
- Ballynahatty woman
