= A55 road (Northern Ireland) =

Road in Northern Ireland

Coordinates: 54.56784°N 5.89886°W

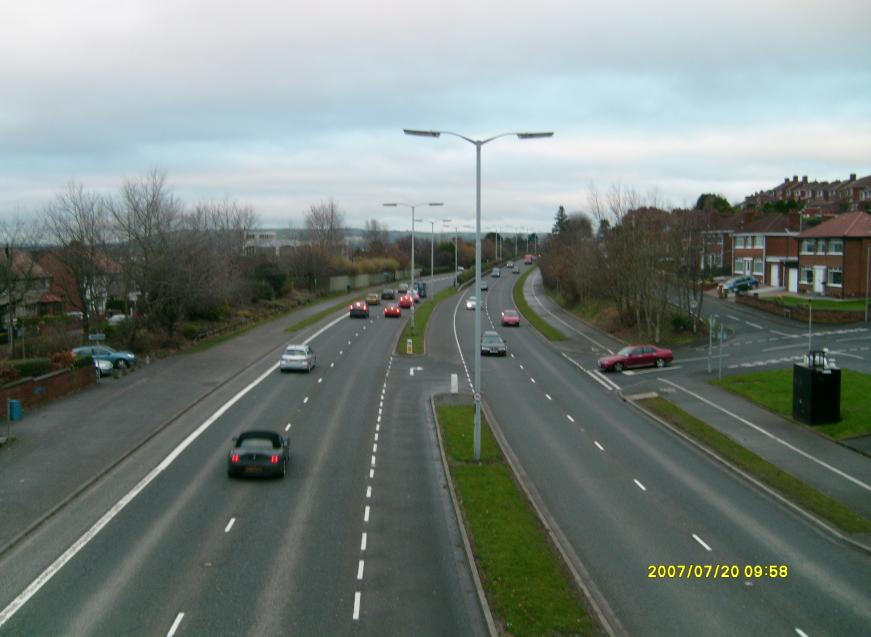
The A55 at Knockbreda in south Belfast. (View eastwards.)

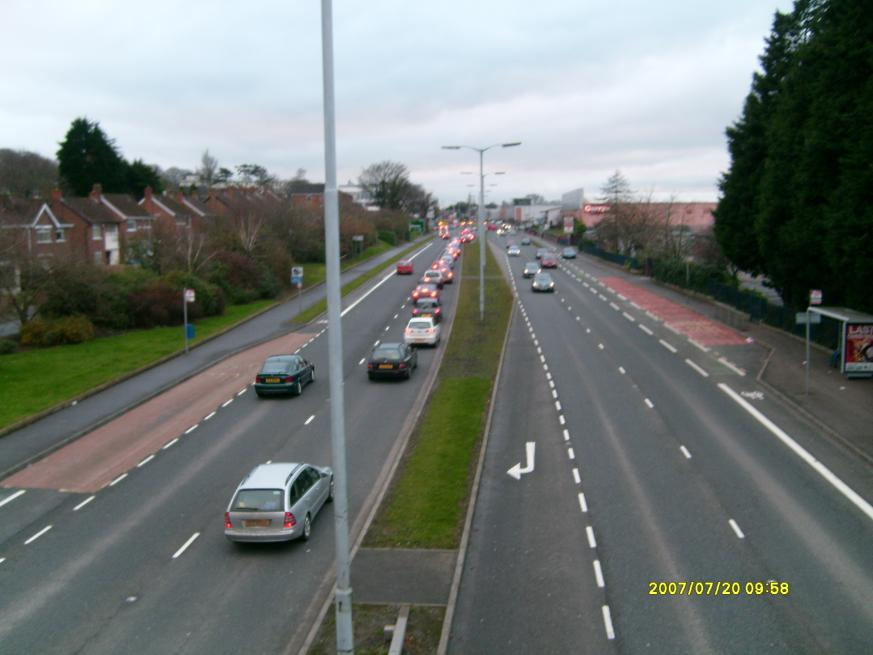
The A55 at Knockbreda in south Belfast. (View westwards towards Forestside Shopping Centre.)

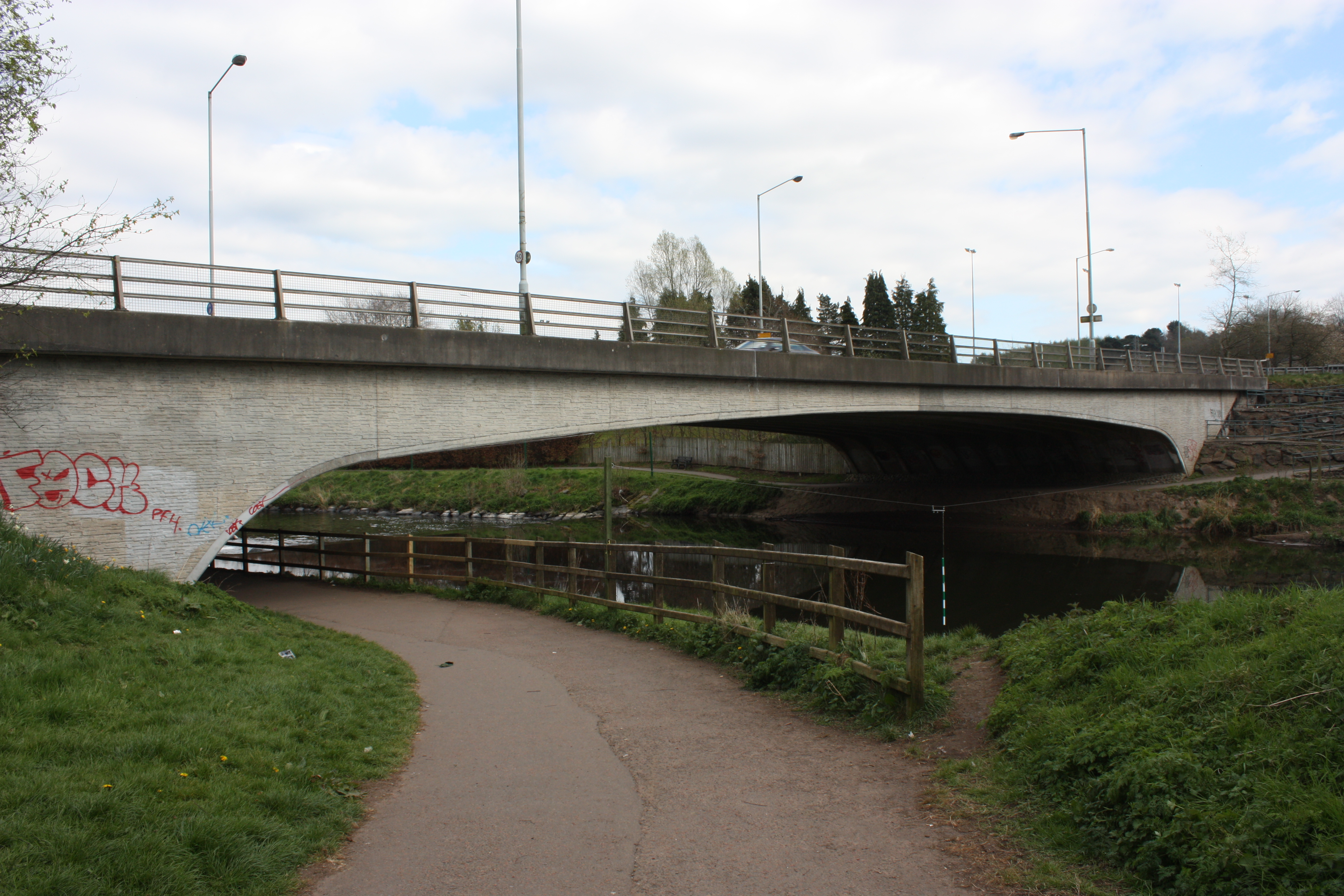
The A55 crossing the Lagan at Shaw's Bridge

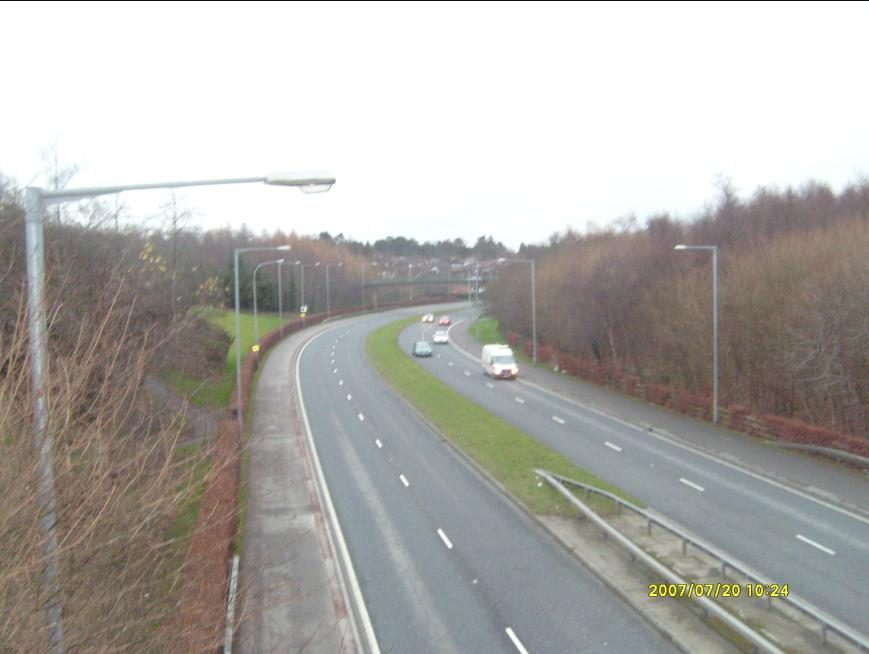
The A55 near Ballymaghan and Belmont in east Belfast. (View southwestwards.)

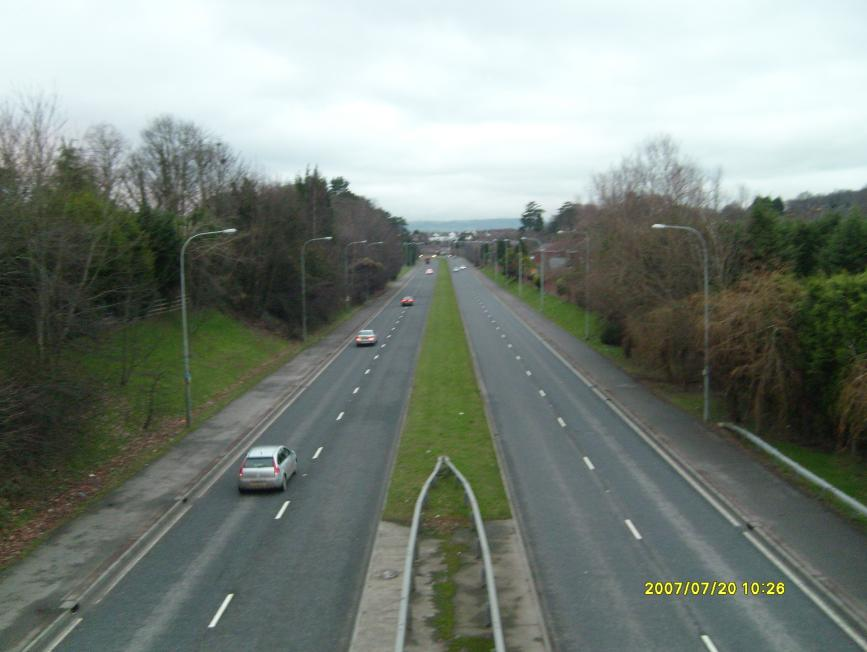
The A55 near Ballymaghan and Belmont in south Belfast. (View northwards towards Holywood.)

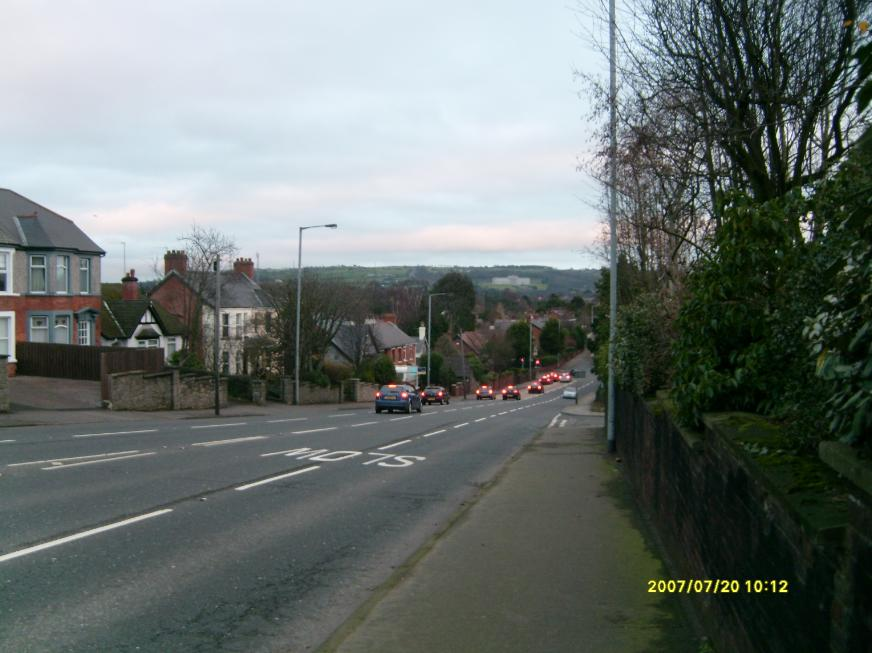
The A55 in Knock, east Belfast. (View northeastwards towards Stormont.)

The A55 road forms Belfast's outer-ring road.

== Description ==
A55 links many of the main arterial routes within the city as well as creating a bypass of the often congested city centre and problematic A12 Westlink. Large sections of the route in east Belfast have been upgraded to dual carriageway standard with at-grade traffic light controlled junctions, together with off-road cycle paths alongside. However many sections (e.g. through Knock and from the Shaw's Bridge (Belvoir) to the M1) remain single carriageway, with four lanes of traffic. (Though the section through Knock has a proposed upgrade going through the final designs stages as of January 2009.) Despite this, all of the route in the west and north of the city (with the notable exception of the Monagh Bypass near Andersonstown) is nothing more than a single carriageway two-lane road based on local city streets and arterial routes.

=== Crossing the Lagan ===
The A55 crosses the River Lagan at Lagan Valley Regional Park, where the Malone Road becomes the Milltown Road. The single-span, 70m-long arched concrete bridge runs parallel to the more historic Shaw's Bridge, which it replaced in 1977.

Next crossing upstream	River Lagan	Next crossing downstream
Shaw's Bridge	Shaw's Bridge (A55)	Governor's Bridge

== Proposed upgrades ==
The lack of investment directed towards an upgrade for these sections of the city's ring road can be explained by a lack of demand, relatively lower traffic levels and few industrial sites in comparison to those of the south and east. However, in an attempt to attract inwards investment into the area the West Belfast & Greater Shankill Task Force has laid out a plan (publicised in late 2008) which proposes to extend and improve the route; extending from the Monagh Bypass as far north as the A52 Crumlin Road in the northwest of the city.
