= John Craig Wallace =

Horticulturist (1928–2020)

- Born: 31 July 1928; East Belfast
- Died: 18 November 2020 (aged 92); Bangor
- Occupation: Horticulturist
- Known for: Director of Parks for Belfast City Council; articles about horticulture, especially roses

John Craig Wallace MBE (31 July 1928 – 18 November 2020) was a horticulturalist and writer. He was Director of Parks for Belfast City Council (1972–1988) and founded the Rose Society of Northern Ireland.

== Personal life and education ==
John Craig Wallace attended Ballymena Academy. After gaining some practical experience in horticulture, he gained a distinction in the general horticultural course at Greenmount College of Agriculture and Horticulture, County Antrim. In 1948 he took a degree in horticultural science at University of Reading.

He married and had two sons. He married Iris Veronica Martin in 1954 and their two sons, Ian and Duncan, now live in Newtownards and Perth, Australia respectively.

== Career ==
Craig Wallace worked at Samuel McGredy and Son, a company that bred and raised roses, immediately after leaving school. After completing his degree, he joined the horticultural education and advisory service of the Ministry of Agriculture in Northern Ireland. He was promoted to co-ordinating this service in 1953. He was Director of Parks for Belfast City Council from 1972 until 1988 and during this time directed repair of the Palm House and Tropical Ravine in the Botanic Gardens and the restoration of Malone House in Barnett Demesne as well as several other places that came into council ownership including Clement Wilson Park, Knocknagoney Linear Park, Danny Blanchflower Playing Fields and Cavehill Country Park. He also introduced more planting of street trees, floral displays and hanging baskets in the city.

He led the development of the City of Belfast International Rose Gardens in collaboration with Sam McGredy IV and also began trials of new varieties in Sir Thomas and Lady Dixon Park in 1964. He founded the Rose Society of Northern Ireland and was Secretary (1964–1972) and then President (1988–2018). In 1978 Craig Wallace made sure that Northern Ireland was included in the Britain in Bloom contests. He retired in 1988.

Craig Wallace wrote about gardening in the Belfast Telegraph from 1960 until 2001, as well as several horticultural magazines.

He was awarded the RHS Associate of Honour in 1981 for his work with Belfast parks, MBE in 1987 for services to horticulture and the Royal National Rose Society Silver Medal (2004).
