= Giant's Park =

Planned public park in Belfast

- Interactive map of Giant's Park
- Type: Public park
- Location: Belfast, Northern Ireland
- Coordinates: 54.632°N 5.910°W
- Area: 200 acres (0.81 km²)
- Created: Planned
- Status: Under development

Giant's Park is a planned public park, in Belfast, Northern Ireland. The proposed 200-acre (0.81 km^{2}) site is the Dargan Road Landfill site on the northern shore of Belfast Lough Its name comes from the nearby Cavehill, which is thought to be the inspiration for Jonathan Swift's Gulliver's Travels. He described the hills as a sleeping giant, safeguarding the city. Planned features of the park include an educational facility and festival space.

Since 2017, Belfast’s newest film studio based on an 8-acre site at Giant’s Park. Belfast Harbour Studios provides more than 120,000 sq ft of studios, workshops and offices. Ulster University in partnership with Belfast Harbour and supported by Northern Ireland Screen, has developed an additional film production facility at the site, including an integrated R&D centre for real-time and virtual production. Studio Ulster is expected to be fully operation early in 2024.

== See also ==
List of parks and gardens in Belfast
