= Giant's Ring =

Neolithic henge monument

- An Fáinne Mór (Irish)
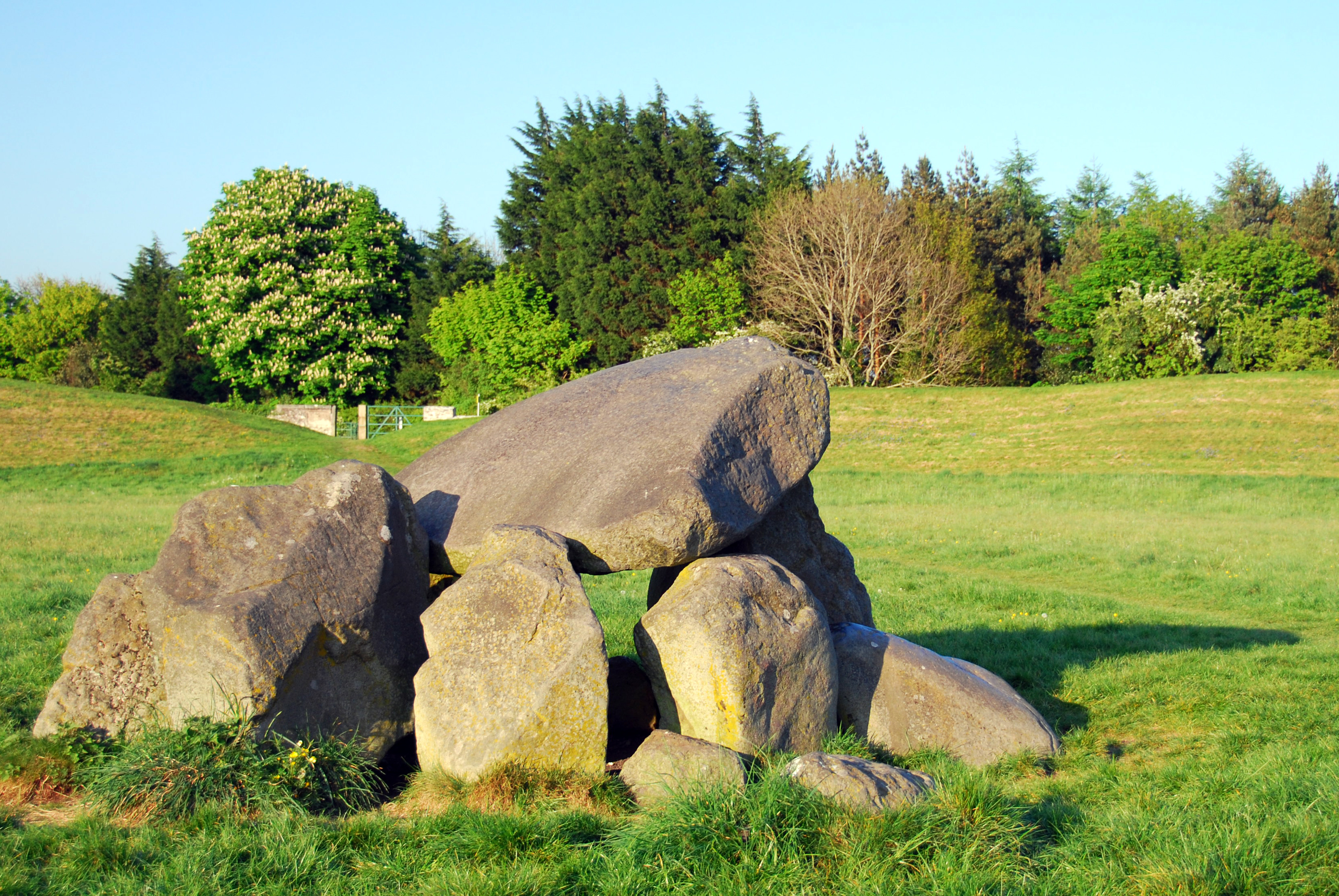
- The Megalithic tomb at the centre of the Giant's Ring

- Location in County Down, Northern Ireland
- 54°32′25″N 5°57′0″W
- Type: Henge
- Periods: Neolithic
- Location: County Down, Northern Ireland

History
- Built: c. 2700 BC

Site notes
- Material: Dirt
- Height: 3.5 m (11 ft)
- Diameter: 180 m (590 ft)
- Public access: Open
- Contains a central passage tomb

The Giant's Ring is a henge monument at Ballynahatty, near Shaw's Bridge, Belfast, Northern Ireland. The site is a State Care Historic Monument and also a Site of Special Scientific Interest.

The site consists of a circular enclosure, 180 m (590 ft) in diameter and 2.8 hectares (6.9 acres) in area, surrounded by a circular earthwork bank 3.5 m (11 ft) high. At least three of the five irregularly spaced gaps in the bank are intentional and possibly original. East of the centre of the enclosure is a small passage tomb with a vestigial passage facing west. There were reports of other tombs outside the enclosure, but there is no trace of these.

A wall to protect the site was constructed under the supervision of local landowner Arthur Hill-Trevor, 3rd Viscount Dungannon in 1837. An inscribed stone tablet on the wall surrounding the site, which details Viscount Dungannon's interest, was carved by Belfast stone-carver Charles A Thompson c. 1919.

== History ==
The Giant's Ring dates from the Neolithic period and was built around 2700 BC, before the Egyptian pyramids. The site has had some sort of public use throughout its history. It is near the Shaw's Bridge crossing of the River Lagan, a point which has been used as a crossing of the river since at least the Stone Age.

It is generally assumed that the tomb structure in the centre is earlier than the ring and that the earthwork enclosure was created afterwards, perhaps as a function of activities that took place there. Substantial effort over many years would have been needed to construct this earthworks.

The original purpose of the monument is unknown but it has often been hypothesised that it meeting place or as a memorial to the dead. Over time the usage may well have changed so it impossible to ascribe a single defined usage to such a site.

Archaeologist Michael J. O'Kelly believed that the Giant's Ring, like hundreds of other passage tombs built in Ireland during the Neolithic period, such as Newgrange, showed evidence for a religion which venerated the dead as one of its core principles. He believed that this "cult of the dead" was just one particular form of European Neolithic religion, and that other megalithic monuments displayed evidence for different religious beliefs which were solar, rather than death-orientated.

In the 18th century, the site was used for horse racing. A ritual site adjacent to the henge was excavated in the early 1990s by Barrie Hartwell of the Queen's University of Belfast who has published a comprehensive and thorough account of the site, the many excavations and possible original usages of the wider Ballynahatty townland in which the Giant's Ring is situated.

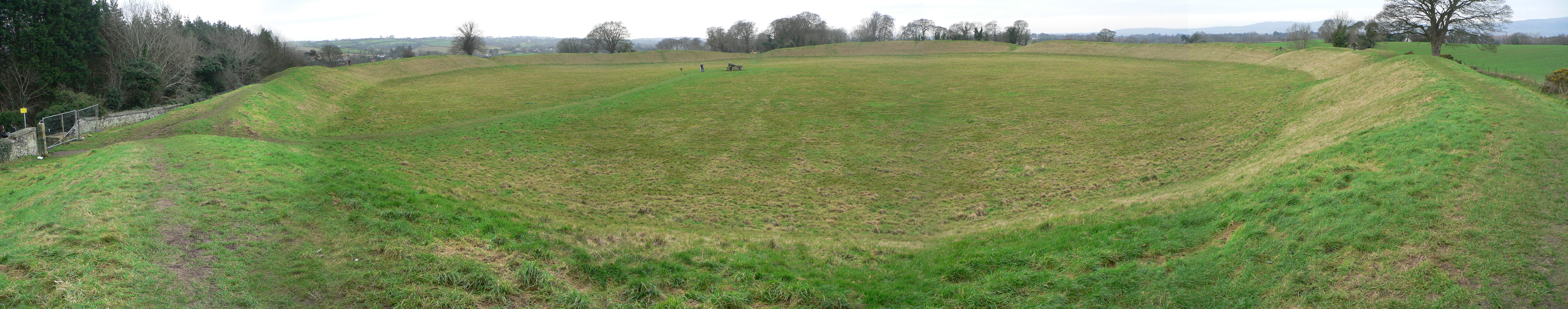
A panorama of The Giant's Ring

== See also ==
- List of archaeological sites in County Down
- List of megalithic monuments in Ireland
