= Shaw's Bridge =

Bridges in Belfast, Northern Ireland

Coordinates: 54°33′08″N 5°57′11″W

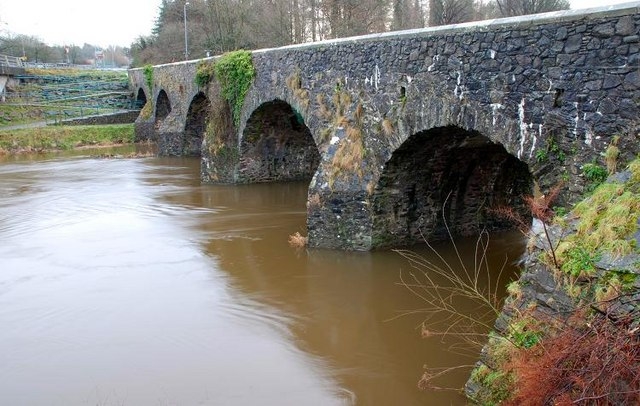
The older Shaw's Bridge in 2007

Shaw's Bridge is the name given to two adjacent bridges across the River Lagan in Belfast, Northern Ireland. The older of the bridges is a historic stone arched bridge (built 1709), which is open to cyclists and pedestrians. The new bridge is a concrete bridge which carries the A55 road. They are 3 miles (5 km) south of the city centre.

== Old bridge ==
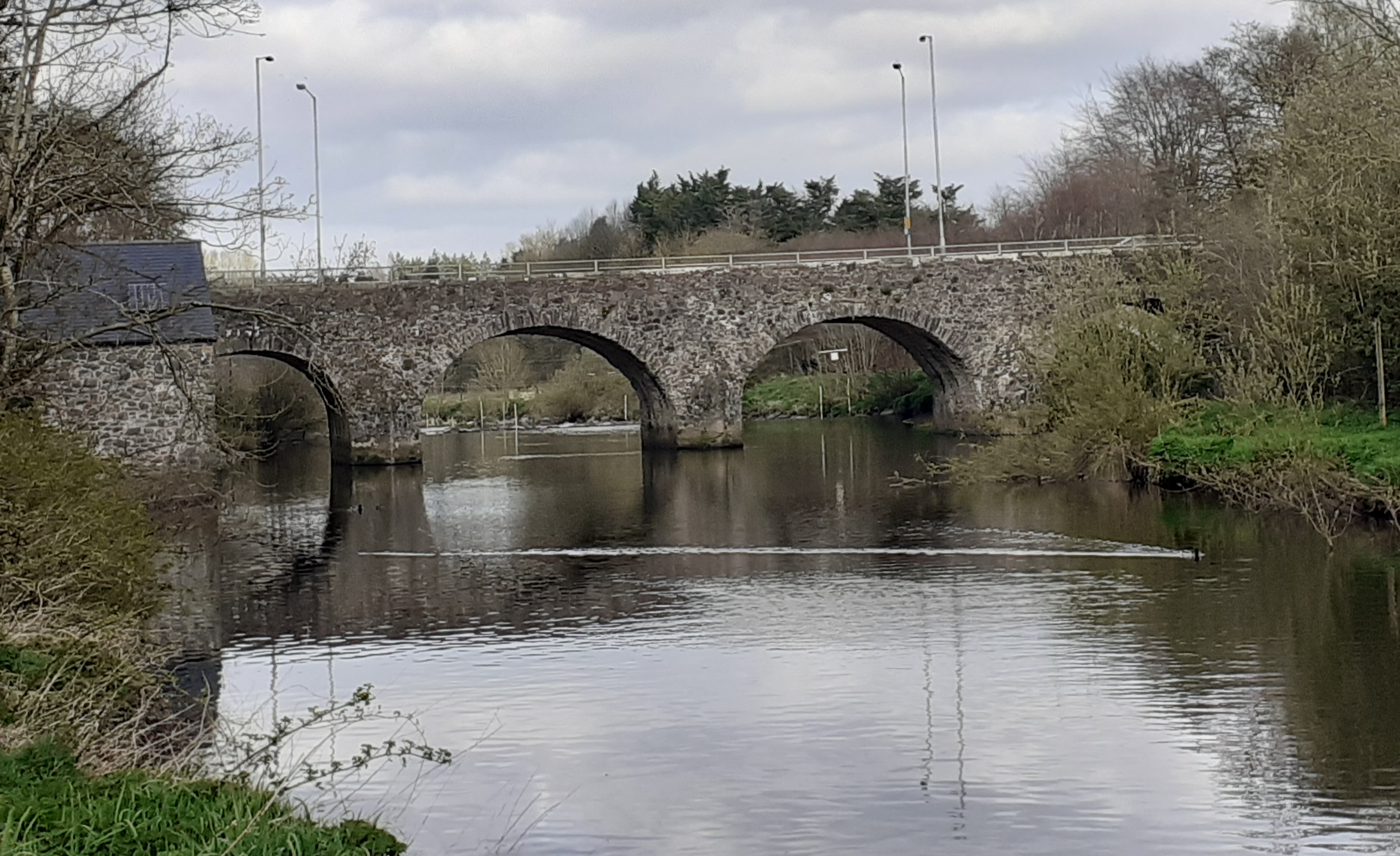
The older bridge crossing the Lagan at Shaw's Bridge

The crossing is located at a shallow section of the Lagan, which had historically been used as a crossing point. The bridge is named after Captain John Shaw of Oliver Cromwell's army, who built an oak bridge here in 1655, possibly replacing one from 1617. A stone bridge was built in 1691 by Thomas Burgh, although this was destroyed by floods, leading to its replacement with the current bridge in 1709.

The bridge is composed of five stone arches: four across the river and one across the adjacent footpath. Its deck is only wide enough for one lane of traffic. Despite this, it was an important connection for many years, carrying the main road from Belfast to County Down and Dublin. The construction of the A55 road rendered the bridge obsolete, and in 1977 it was pedestrianised, along with its approach roads. It now forms part of the Lagan Valley Regional Park.

Next bridge upstream	River Lagan	Next bridge downstream
Gilchrist Bridge	Shaw's Bridge	Shaw's bridge (new)

== New bridge ==
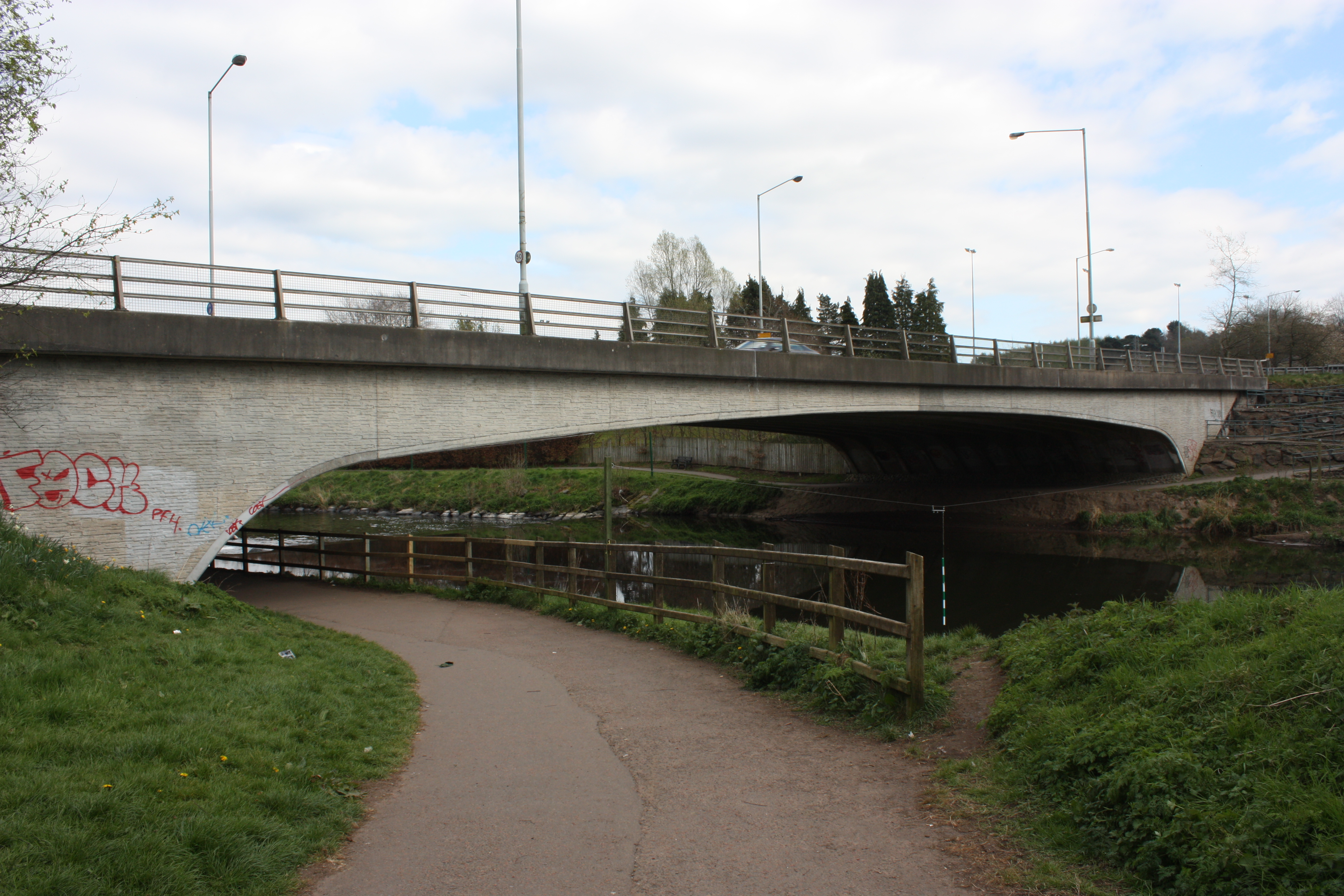
The A55 crossing the Lagan at Shaw's Bridge

In 1977, a section of the A55 road was opened across the Lagan Valley. The road forms Belfast's outer-ring road, and crosses the Lagan on a specially constructed bridge, 20m downstream of the existing bridge. This bridge, also referred to as Shaw's Bridge, is a concrete arch bridge which crosses the river and the footpaths on either side in one 70m span.

Next bridge upstream	River Lagan	Next bridge downstream
Shaw's Bridge (old)	Shaw's Bridge	John Luke Bridge

== In popular culture ==
The old bridge is depicted in a painting by Belfast-born artist John Luke. In 2018, the bridge and adjacent boat house were both featured in BBC drama Come Home.
