= Sir Thomas and Lady Dixon Park =

Public park, Belfast, Northern Ireland

Coordinates: 54.541°N 5.980°W

The Sir Thomas and Lady Dixon Park is a park in South Belfast, Northern Ireland, covering almost 130 acres (0.53 km^{2}) and is accessible from the Upper Malone Road. It includes meadows, woodland, riverside fields, formal rose gardens, a walled garden and a Japanese garden, as well as a children's playground, coffee shop, an orienteering course and many walks. It is owned and maintained by Belfast City Council's Parks and Cemeteries Services Section. On 14 July 2010, the park hosted the annual International Rose Trials, the highlight of Rose Week, involving judges from around the world.

== History ==
The park was bequeathed to the people of Belfast in 1959 by Lady Edith Stewart Dixon and was dedicated to the memory of her husband, the late Sir Thomas Dixon. The first roses were planted in 1964 and the Trial roses were judged for the first time in summer 1965. A permanent panel of judges is provided by the Rose Society of Northern Ireland, formed by Craig Wallace in 1964.

== Gallery ==
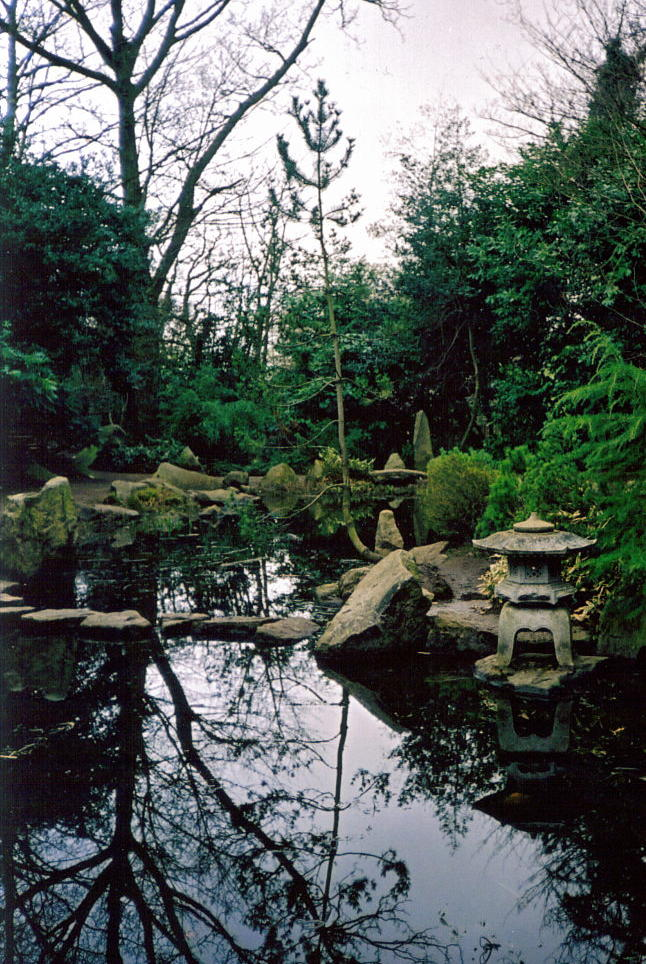
Japanese garden, 2002

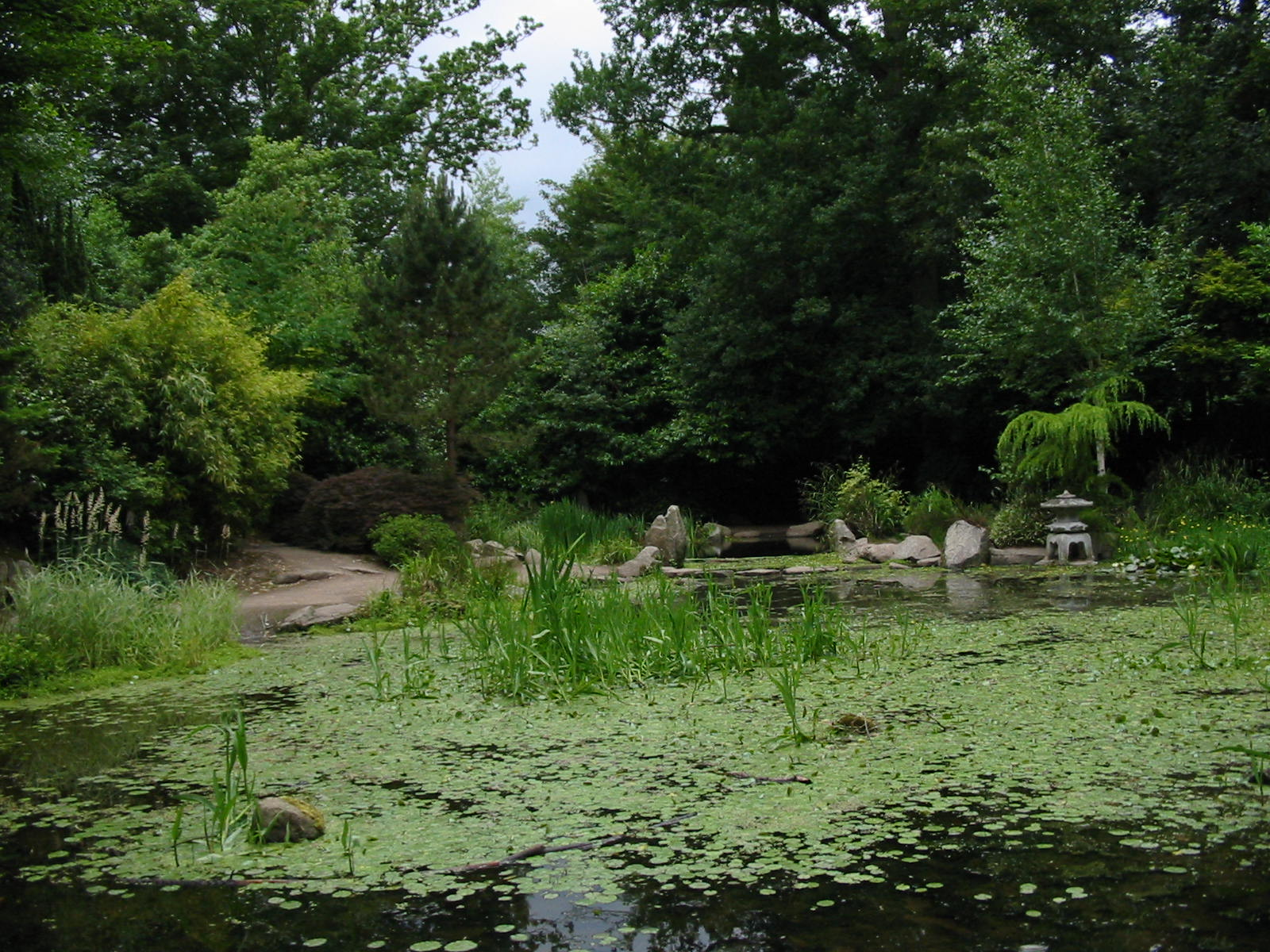
Shady pond, 2006

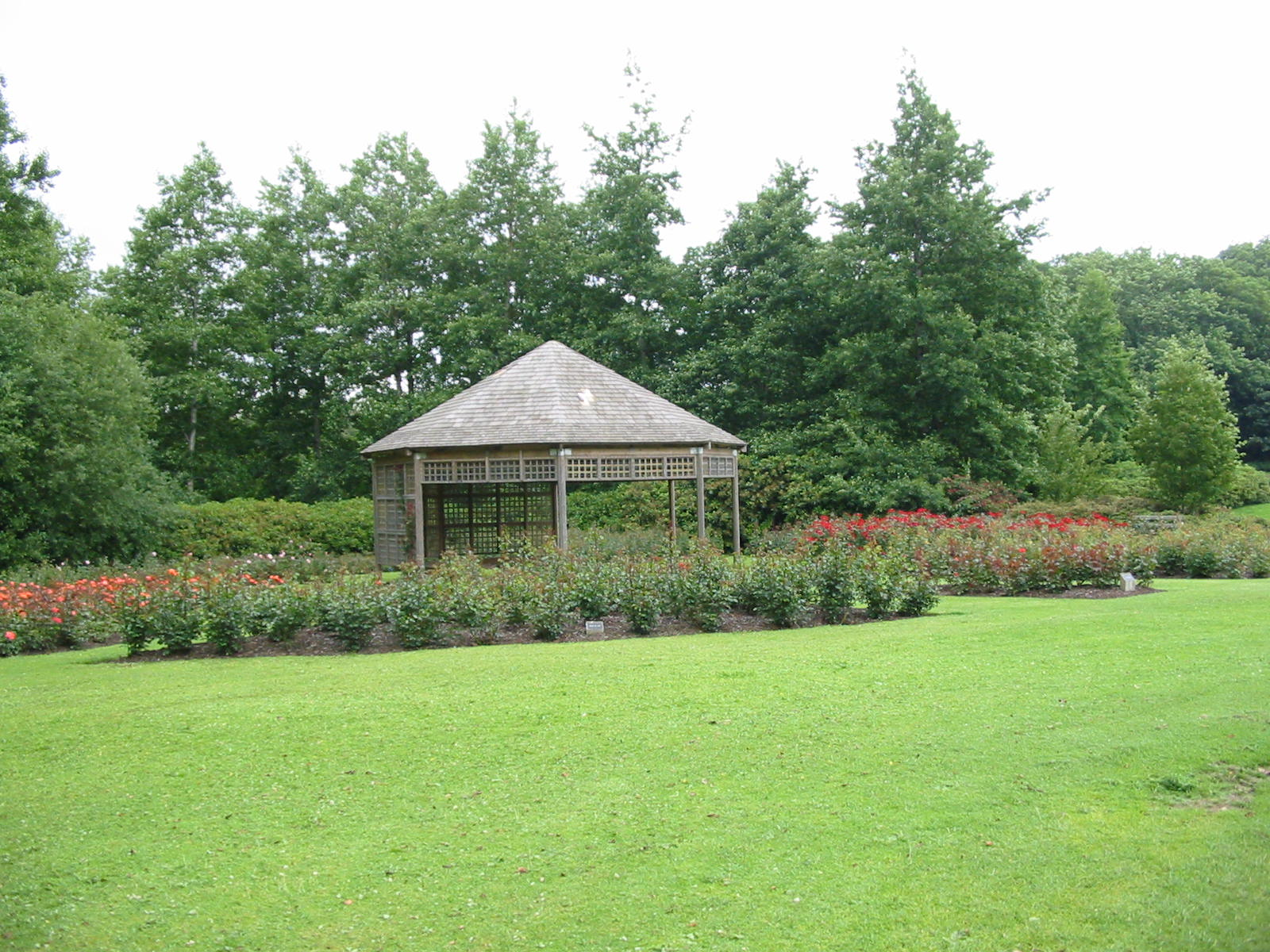
Rose Garden, 2006

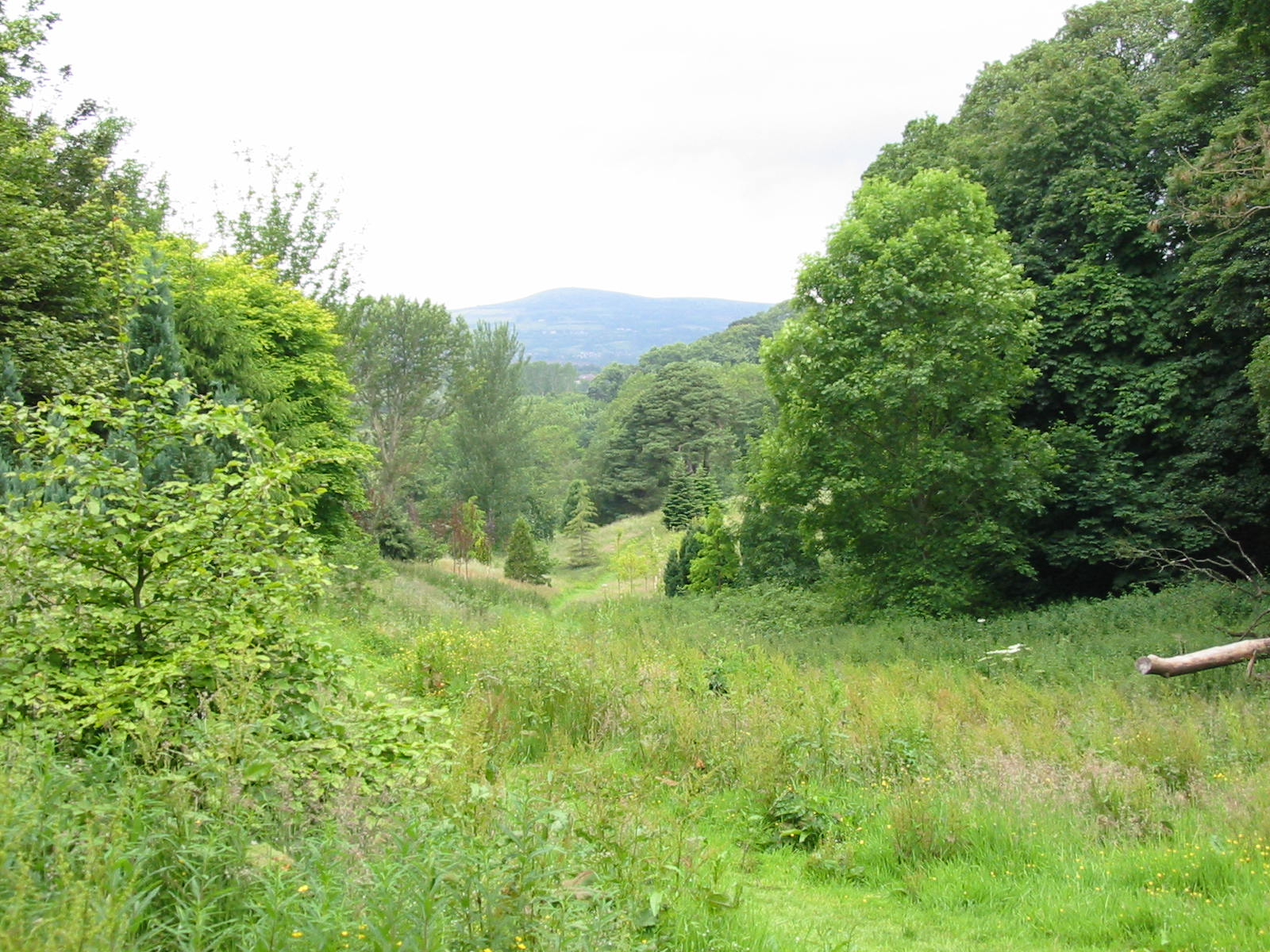
Meadow and woodland, 2006

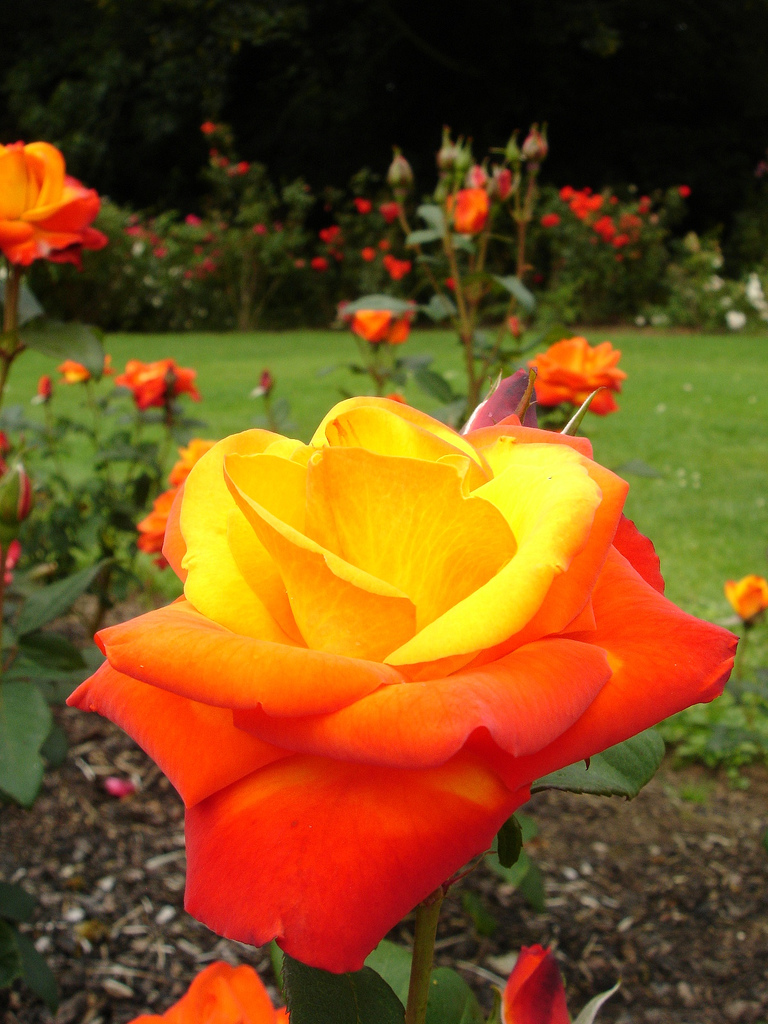
Rose in International Rose Week 2006
