= Woodvale Park =

Park in Belfast, Northern Ireland

Coordinates: 54°36′26″N 05°57′54″W

- Interactive map of Woodvale Park
- Location: Belfast, Northern Ireland
- Created: 1888
- Operator: Belfast City Council

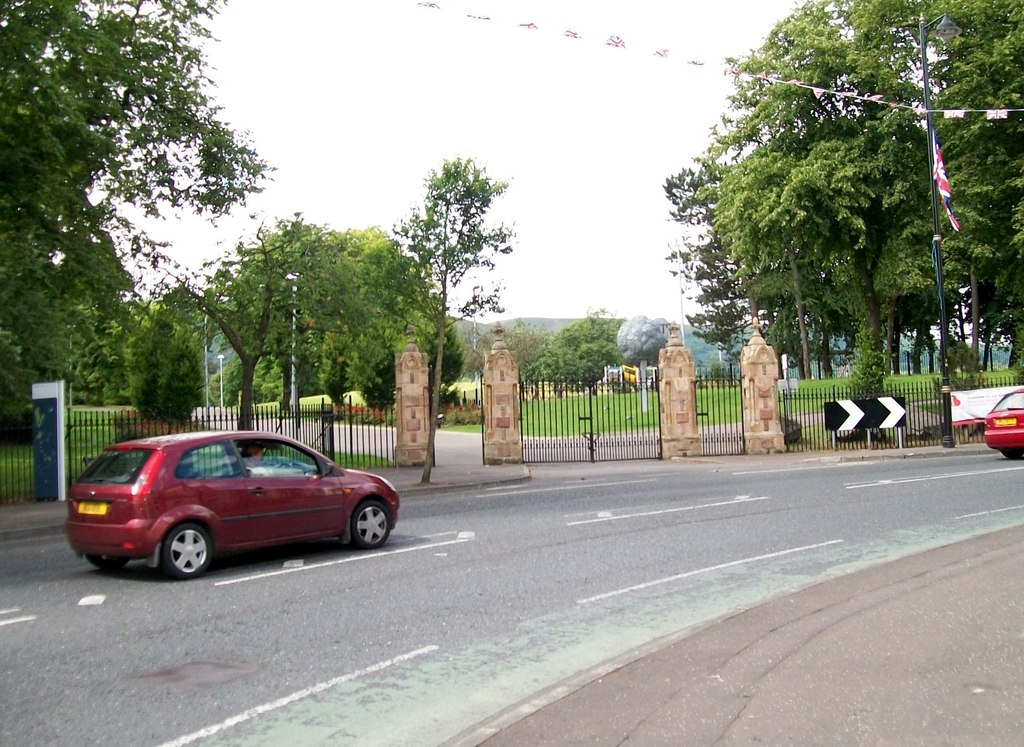
The gates of the park

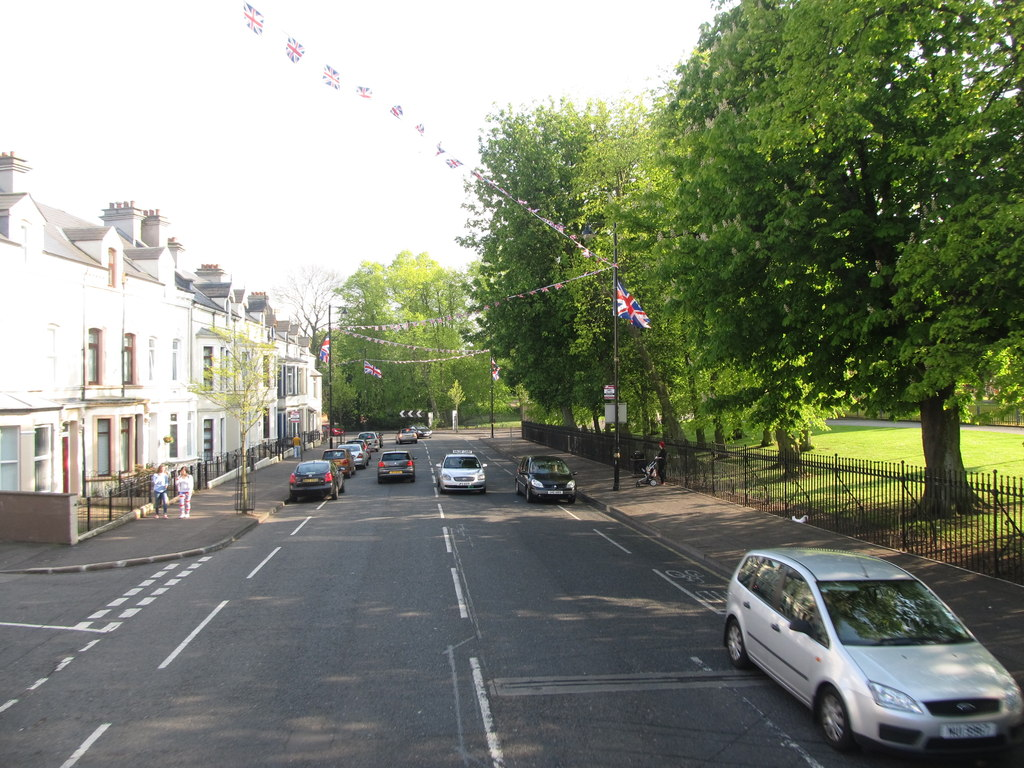
The park and the adjacent Woodvale Road

Woodvale Park is a park in Belfast, Northern Ireland. Opened in 1888 and run by the city council, it provides a venue for association football and bowls as well as a children's play area and landscaped areas for walking. The park is home to the Peace Tree, an oak planted in 1919 to commemorate the end of the First World War, which was voted Northern Ireland's Tree of the Year for 2015. The European War Memorial honouring those from all sides killed during the First World War was unveiled in the park in 2014.

== Description ==
The park lies in the Woodvale district of Belfast adjacent to Woodvale Road and Ballygomartin Road. The park is a current holder of a Green Flag Award. Woodvale park has full size association football pitches, 7-a-side football pitches, a bowls green and pavilion, a children's playground, a toddlers play area, an outdoor exercise area, a community garden and allotments. Its landscape features a bandstand, landscaped flower beds and shrubberies. It has several trails said to be popular with walkers. The park opens at 7.30 a.m. each day and some of the grounds are lit.

== History ==
The park was originally the site of Woodvale House, which was located in southern portion of the grounds adjacent to Woodvale Road. The house and grounds were sold to the Belfast Corporation by Reverend Glover in 1888. The corporation planned to open the park to the public under the name "Shankhill Park", but this was changed to "Woodvale Park" shortly before it opened. The park opened to the public on 18 August 1888. It was scheduled to be opened by local dignitaries at 3pm. There was a delay in the representatives arriving and at 3.35pm a park ranger unlocked the gates and opened the park to a large waiting crowd.

The park originally featured a pond that was used for ice skating in the winter. This was filled in at some point after the Second World War and the children's play area constructed on the site. The park underwent a £2 million refurbishment that was completed in August 2013. A formal reopening was to have been carried out by the Sinn Féin Lord Mayor of Belfast Máirtín Ó Muilleoir. During the ceremony he came under attack by loyalist members of the crowd. Ó Muilleoir sought refuge in a nearby shed and remained there for 20 minutes whilst his police escort organised an escape. Three men later appeared in court charged with disorder over the incident.

The park's bandstand was granted protection as a listed structure in March 2016. That October a statue was unveiled in the park to commemorate Shankill's contribution to boxing history. In 2017 the council, in conjunction with the Northern Ireland Housing Executive opened elf-themed children's trails within the park. An accompanying puzzle booklet was also produced. In July 2018 the park hosted the first Woodvale Festival, a free event featuring pop music, fairground amusements and traditional local dancing and music. In September 2018 a sculpted metal bench was placed in the park as a memorial to those lost to suicide and to encourage people to talk about their mental health.

== War memorial ==
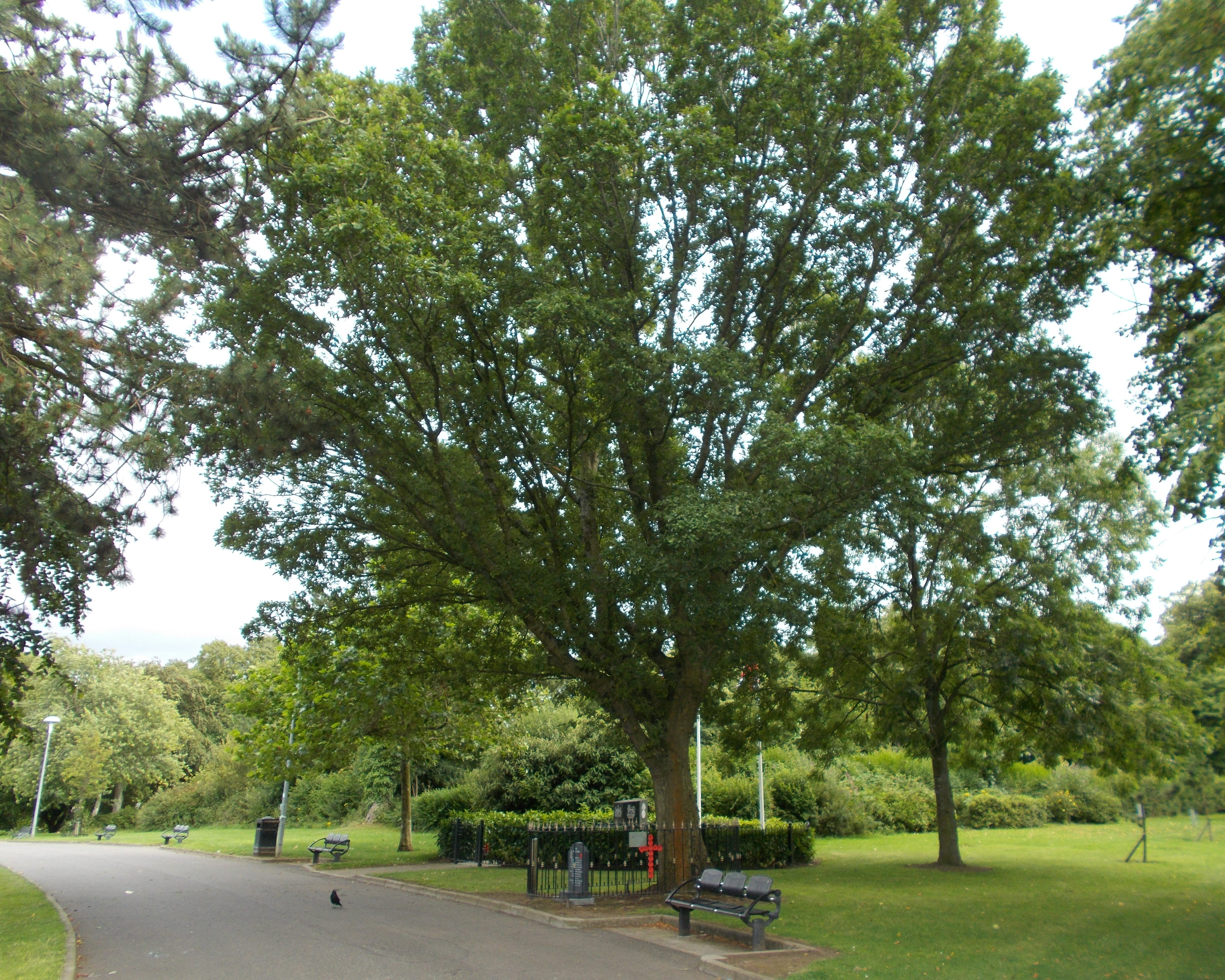
The Peace Tree

An oak tree (Quercus robur), known as the Peace Tree, was planted in the park on Empire Day 1919 to remember those killed during the First World War. It became a focal point for veterans in the local area. A similar tree was planted at the same time in Falls Park but died of natural causes. Discussions have taken place recently between local politicians with a view to replacing the tree.

The Woodvale Park tree was later forgotten until its rediscovery during preparations for the 90th anniversary of start of the Battle of the Somme in 2006. At this time the original railing around the tree, which had been lost, was replaced. The tree and its planting ceremony are recounted in Robert Scott's work A Breath of Fresh Air, The Story of Belfast Parks. The Peace Tree was voted Northern Ireland's Tree of the Year for 2015. It was nominated for the European Tree of the Year competition of 2016 and came 13th out of 15 trees with 628 votes.

A memorial for the First World War was unveiled in the park in October 2014, near to the Peace Tree. Known as the European War Memorial, it commemorates the dead from all sides, including Germany, and was said to be unique in this respect. The memorial is a 6.5 tonne chunk of granite cut with six sides to resemble a stone from Giant's Causeway. The unveiling ceremony was conducted by the Lord Lieutenant of Belfast, Fionnuala Jay-O'Boyle and was attended by senior unionist politicians. The memorial was vandalised in May 2016 with a stone tablet being smashed, the main memorial daubed in green paint, flowers being ripped up and a European Union flag torn down. The memorial was repaired and rededicated on 1 July 2016, the 100th anniversary of the first day on the Somme.
