= Ballynahatty woman =

Prehistoric woman found in Northern Ireland

The Ballynahatty Woman is the name given to a prehistoric female discovered in 1855 in the townland of Ballynahatty, near Belfast. She is estimated to have lived approximately 5,000 years ago. In 2015, geneticists from Trinity College Dublin and archaeologists from Queen's University Belfast sequenced her genome, along with that of three men who lived around 4,000 years ago.

Both the Ballynahatty Woman and one of the men were found to carry mutations associated with hemochromatosis, a condition characterized by excessive iron retention in the body and prevalent in Ireland. Genetic analysis revealed her Neolithic Anatolian ancestry and showed that, among modern populations, she most closely resembles the Basques and Sardinians.

== See also ==
- Laurence Waddell
