= Ballynahatty, County Down =

Townland near Belfast, Northern Ireland

Coordinates: 54°32′32″N 5°57′24″W

Ballynahatty: Irish: Baile na hÁite Tí
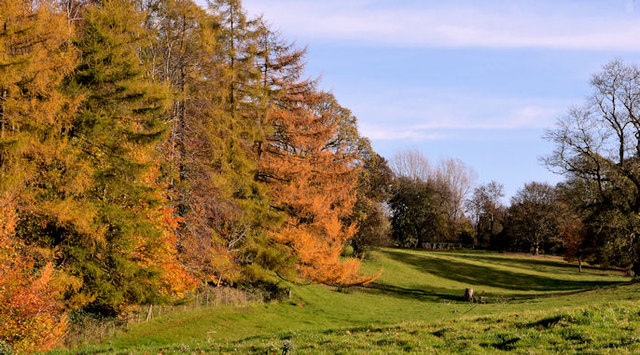
- Countryside at Ballynahatty

- Location within Northern Ireland Location within County Down Ballynahatty (County Down)
- Irish grid reference: J327667
- District: Lisburn and Castlereagh
- County: County Down
- Country: Northern Ireland
- Sovereign state: United Kingdom
- Post town: BELFAST
- Postcode district: BT8
- Dialling code: 028
- UK Parliament: Lagan Valley
- NI Assembly: Lagan Valley

Ballynahatty (from Irish Baile na hÁite Tí 'townland of the house site') is a townland in County Down, Northern Ireland. It lies on the southern edge of Belfast. It contains the Giants Ring, a henge monument.

The remains of a woman who was part of a Neolithic farming community were discovered buried in the henge in 1855. Now known as Ballynahatty woman, her genome was sequenced in 2015 and reveals a woman with black hair and brown eyes typical of those with Mediterranean heritage. This implies that Ballynahatty woman was part of a group of Early European Farmers (EEFs) that migrated across Europe in the Neolithic period, originating in the Middle East.

== Archeology ==
Ballynahatty is scheduled as a historic monument in 2019 under the Historic Monuments and Archaeological Objects (NI) Order 1995, and the area encompasses a dense concentration of archaeological features. These include standing stones, megalithic tombs, timber circles, cremation and cist burials, ring ditch cemeteries, ancient routeways, and enclosures. Notably, the site known as "Ballynahatty 5", excavated in the 1990s, revealed a massive timber circle and temple-like complex. Aerial surveys in 2018 further expanded understanding of the site, uncovering additional ring ditches and routeways leading toward the River Lagan. The landscape is considered comparable in significance to Brú na Bóinne.

Archaeological investigations have revealed evidence of human activity dating back to the Mesolithic period, with pollen analysis indicating woodland disturbance around 6410–6220 cal BC. During the Early Neolithic (c.3950–3700 cal BC), the area experienced significant forest clearance and the development of a mixed agricultural economy. Monumental constructions followed in the Mid-Neolithic (c.3600–3100 cal BC), including a passage tomb and the Giant’s Ring henge, which encircles the tomb and measures 190 metres in diameter. Excavations have also identified double-palisaded timber enclosures, cremation pits, and posthole structures interpreted as mortuary features. Radiocarbon dating places the use and dismantling of these timber complexes between 3080 and 2490 cal BC. The archaeological record suggests that these monuments were built within a domesticated landscape already shaped by agricultural practices.

=== Sepulchral chamber ===
Discovered in 1855 a subterranean circular structure approximately seven feet in diameter was located in a field almost adjoining the north side of the Giant's Ring. The chamber featured a flagged floor, six internal compartments formed by upright stones, and a roof of large flagstones. Excavation revealed cremated remains in clay urns, unburnt human bones including five skulls, and bones of domesticated animals. The chamber's construction and contents suggest it served as a communal burial site for a settled population engaged in agriculture and pastoralism.

Additional archaeological evidence from the surrounding field, long held by the Bodel family, includes stone coffins, urns, flint tools, and signs of extensive interments. The proximity to the Giant's Ring—a large circular enclosure with a central cromlech—indicates the site may date to a pre-Christian era and reflect burial practices of an advanced early population. The diversity of burial methods and absence of inscriptions or artifacts complicate precise dating, but the findings contribute significantly to understanding prehistoric life in Ireland.

== Geography ==
Townlands that border Ballynahatty include:

- Ballycowan to the east
- Ballydollaghan to the east
- Ballynavally to the east
- Edenderry to the west
- Malone Upper to the west
