= Murder of Margaret Perry =

Northern-Irish murder case

Margaret Perry
- Born: Northern Ireland
- Died: 21 June 1991 (aged 26); Portadown, County Armagh
- Body discovered: 30 June 1992
- Occupation: Civil servant
- Partner: Gregory Burns

On 21 June 1991, Margaret Perry, a 26‑year‑old woman from Portadown, County Armagh, Northern Ireland, was abducted. After a tip from the IRA, her body was found buried across the border in a field in Mullaghmore, County Sligo, Ireland, on 30 June 1992. She had been beaten to death. Her murder has never been solved.

== Background ==
Margaret Perry was a civil servant, working at Training and Employment in Lisburn. A Catholic, she lived with her widowed mother, Mary, at Churchill Park, Portadown. She disappeared on 21 June 1991 after crossing the border into the Republic of Ireland to visit her boyfriend, Gregory Burns, who was hospitalised in Monaghan. A year later, on 30 June 1992, acting on a tip-off from the IRA via a local priest, the Garda found her body near Mullaghmore. She had been strangled and beaten to death with a spade, then buried in a shallow grave in a forest on the former estate of Lord Mountbatten.

== Deaths of Burns, Dignam, Starrs ==
In June 1992, shortly after the recovery of Perry's body, the PIRA admitted responsibility for the killing of three men whose bodies were found at different roadsides in County Armagh. The IRA stated the men, all members of the organisation, were undercover agents for MI5 and the RUC Special Branch. The bodies were left naked and hooded in ditches. Each bore evidence of torture and a single bullet wound to the back of the head. The men were Gregory Burns (aged 33), John Dignam (aged 32), and Aidan Starrs (aged 29), all from Portadown.

The IRA stated the three were responsible for Perry's abduction and murder. They alleged Burns had had an affair with Perry, and that she threatened to reveal his group's intelligence links. According to the IRA, the men kidnapped and murdered her. As the bodies might have been booby‑trapped, they were left in place overnight.

== Allegations by An Phoblacht ==
It was later alleged, in an article in the Sinn Féin newspaper An Phoblacht, that Dignam had been detained by the RUC over Perry's disappearance in the summer of 1991. During interrogation, he allegedly confessed to her murder and implicated the other two men. The article alleged that instead of arresting the three, they were recruited as informers for the Force Research Unit, and that the man in charge of their interrogation and executions was Freddie Scappaticci.

The article also alleged that Burns had been a paid agent of MI5 for 13 years, since being recruited in Enniskillen. It alleged he had been an aide to Owen Carron, election worker for Bobby Sands, and that Burns had arranged the killing of his brother, Sean, in 1982, during one of the "shoot-to-kill" controversies of the 1980s.

It was further alleged that Burns had been involved in foiling IRA operations in Northern Ireland. According to the article, he wanted to end his relationship with Perry but feared she would reveal that he had told her he was working for British Intelligence. Burns consulted his handlers, who agreed that he, Dignam, and Starrs should be pulled out before they were uncovered. The head of the FRU, Brigadier Gordon Kerr, refused, telling Burns to resolve the situation. Burns allegedly stated that if he and his comrades were not pulled out, he would have to kill Perry. Burns travelled to Sligo for a minor arm operation in June 1991. On 21 June, Dignam and Starrs drove Perry to Sligo, ostensibly to see Burns, but outside Mullaghmore she was strangled and beaten to death with a spade, then buried in a shallow forest grave.

The allegations in An Phoblacht were denied by the families and supporters of the three men, who alleged the men had been set up. Burns' father, Jim, stated he did not believe his son had any involvement in his brother's death in 1982. The Guardian reported contradictions in the IRA's account.

Investigations into Perry's disappearance by Sunday World reporter Martin O'Hagan prompted IRA interest. Scappaticci and his unit interrogated Burns, Dignam, and Starrs the following year, leading to their deaths. Taped confessions by the three men recorded by Scappaticci were later played to Peter Taylor in a BBC documentary. The IRA gave information to a Sligo priest that led to Perry's body being recovered. Three days later, after nearly two weeks of interrogation, the three men were found dumped in County Armagh. All bore evidence of torture. After Dignam's funeral, a letter by him was given to his pregnant wife:

I have only a matter of hours to live. I only wish I could see you and the kids one last time, but as you know, this is not possible.

== See also ==
- Force Research Unit
- Internal Security Unit
- List of kidnappings
- List of solved missing person cases
- John Joe McGee
- Joseph Fenton
- Murder of Jean McConville
- Murder of Thomas Oliver
- Murders of Catherine and Gerard Mahon
- Stakeknife
