= John McAnulty =

John McAnulty (1940–41 – 1989) was a Northern Irish grain importer and an alleged informant from south County Armagh, killed by the Provisional Irish Republican Army (IRA).

McAnulty, a Catholic, was abducted by the IRA on 17 July 1989 in the Republic of Ireland, tortured, and shot dead. His body was found the following day at Culloville, South Armagh.

McAnulty was named at the Smithwick Tribunal as an intelligence source, and said to be involved in smuggling. He is said to have informed the Royal Ulster Constabulary that Garda Síochána Sergeant Owen Corrigan was colluding with the IRA, and that this led to his death.

== See also ==
- Thomas Murphy (Irish republican)
- Smithwick Tribunal
- 1989 Jonesborough ambush
- Loughgall Ambush
- Internal Security Unit
- Force Research Unit
- Eamon Collins
- John Joe McGee
