= Murder of Mary Travers =

Assassinated Irish teacher (1962–1984)

Mary Travers (Irish: Máire Ó Treabhair; 1962 – 8 April 1984) was a teacher who was shot dead in Belfast on 8 April 1984 by Provisional IRA gunmen trying to assassinate her entire family including her father, Thomas, a Catholic magistrate and her mother Joan. Mary Travers was about 22 at the time.

== Attack ==
She, her parents and siblings had left St Brigid's Catholic Church in Derryvolgie Avenue in south Belfast when two gunmen opened fire. Mary Travers was shot once through the back and her father was shot six times. One gunman brought his gun to point-blank range at her mother's face and attempted to fire twice, but the gun jammed.

In a long letter published in The Irish Times in 1994, Thomas Travers wrote:

"Mary's murder was carried out by member of an evil and brutal criminal organisation. Some of her killers were members of the murder machine, self-named Provisional IRA. At least one was a member of political Sinn Féin... May I say that on the day my lovely daughter was murdered her killer tried to murder my darling wife also. At that time Mary lay dying on her mum's breast, her gentle heart pouring its pure blood on to a dusty street in Belfast. The murderer's gun, which was pointed at my wife's head, misfired twice. Another gunman shot me six times. As he prepared to fire the first shot I saw the look of hatred on his face, a face I will never forget."

"After the attack the IRA claimed the judge had been a legitimate target because of his role in the British judicial system. They also tried to claim that the bullet which killed the young schoolteacher had passed through her father's body first but a post mortem found she was shot directly in the spine."

The IRA said in a statement that the killing of Mary Travers was accidental and that she had been killed by a bullet which passed through her father, hitting her in the back. The guns used in the attack had previously been used to assassinate Judge William Doyle in similar circumstances, in January 1983. Sinn Féin spokesperson Danny Morrison described the killing of Mary Travers as "tragic and regrettable" but said the targeting of her father was "directly related to the political situation in Ireland".

== Arrest ==
Mary McArdle, then aged 19, was arrested shortly after the attack and charged "after two hand guns, a grey wig and a black sock concealed in bandages were found strapped to her thighs." Two months later, 33-year-old IRA member Joseph Patrick Haughey was arrested and charged in connection with the attack. At the trial two years later, McArdle was found guilty and received "a life sentence for her role in the murder of Mary Travers and an 18-year concurrent sentence for the attempted murder of Mr Travers". Haughey was acquitted due to lack of forensic evidence and doubts over his identity, although Thomas Travers had positively identified him.

McArdle served 14 years in prison before being released early under the terms of the Belfast Agreement.

== Aftermath ==
Retired detective superintendent Alan Simpson wrote in the Belfast Telegraph on 11 June 2011 that he believed the shooting of the Travers family was revenge for a successful prosecution in the murder of a prison warder, William McConnell. He went on to say that "It is hard to believe that Sinn Féin are acting other than disingenuously by appointing Mary McArdle to a position carrying a taxpayer-funded salary of £78,000 – three times what a senior nurse in one of our hospitals would earn."

Haughey was later charged in connection with the murder. However, Haughey was acquitted after doubt was cast over Mr Travers' identification of the gunman. Twenty years later it was claimed that he was a long-time double agent for the British secret service (see Freddie Scappaticci). Both men have been closely linked to Sinn Féin President, Gerry Adams.

== Associated Special Adviser Appointment controversy ==
Mary McArdle was released under the terms of the Belfast Agreement. In 2011, McArdle was appointed Ministerial Special Adviser to Sinn Féin Culture Minister Carál Ní Chuilín, herself a former PIRA paramilitary who served four years in prison for firearm possession, possession of explosives with the intent to endanger life, and attempted murder. This move led to outrage that a convicted IRA murderer could hold such a post. Mary Travers' sister, Ann, called on McArdle to resign. In response, McArdle told the Andersonstown News that the killing was "a tragic mistake." McArdle's statement was rebutted by Mary Travers' sister, Ann, who stated:

"Mistake? Mistake? My sister was murdered. There were two gunmen, one standing over my dad shooting him and one who shot my sister in the back and attempted to murder my mother but the bullets jammed in the gun. The fact that she [McArdle] calls my sister’s murder a mistake, well, that day two gunmen went with two guns, so if they were just planning to kill my dad, why did they go out with two guns. They knew my dad wasn't armed. After 27 years I'd have thought I'd be able to speak about my sister's murder factually and without grief but when I heard of Mary McArdle's appointment last Thursday it did something to me which I just have not been able to contain the grief it brought back. Rather than Mary McArdle and Sinn Féin saying her death was a mistake, what they should be saying is Mary Travers' murder is an embarrassment which has come back to haunt them."

Her brother, Paul Travers, who now lives in Australia, told the Belfast Telegraph in July 2011:

"In 2011 we are told to put the past behind us and move on," he said. "I go home every year to visit my family and notice the murals to the hunger strikers are lovingly maintained. My sister Mary did not starve herself to death. She was murdered by those who now claim to be the 'peacemakers'. Mary has no mural. However, her memory is as alive to me now as it was 27 years ago when I travelled with her bloodied body in the ambulance to the Ulster Hospital. It is the same for the other victims of the Troubles."

Paul Travers made an open appeal to Sinn Féin to work with the Historical Enquiries Team and determine who killed his sister:

"You compare yourselves to Nelson Mandela. Well then, do as he did, if you are brave enough. Embrace the need for genuine truth and reconciliation and support the very institutions, such as the Historical Enquiries Team, that have been established to find it. Don't ignore them. Tell us who committed these foul atrocities. It seems to me that you selectively support those aspects of the 1998 peace agreement that suit you and not the ones that don't. You did the same thing during the Troubles. It is not acceptable now. You are the ones who will not move on. You are the ones who perpetuate hurt and promote your brand of hatred. You are the ones who fear the truth. What are you scared of, now you no longer have your guns?"

In June 2013, the Northern Ireland Assembly passed a bill to bar anyone with a serious conviction from being named a special political adviser (SPAD). The bill was put forward by Jim Allister who was inspired by Ann Travers' campaign. Allister said "She (Ann Travers) has done right and done well by her late sister and father, and we all owe her a great debt of gratitude." About the bill, Ann Travers said:

"I'm so pleased, and everything I've done has been for the memory of my beautiful sister Mary ... Hopefully, it will give victims that bit of hope that their voices will start to be heard now, and the we can all progress to a better, shared future."

== See also ==
- Murder of Jean McConville
- Gillian Johnston
- Eamon Ryan (IRA murder victim)
- Murder of Thomas Oliver
- Murder of James Curran

== Bibliography ==
- Lost Lives:The stories of the men, women and children who died as a result of the Northern Ireland troubles, McKittrick, Kelters, Feeney, Thompson, 1999, (2006). ISBN 1-84018-227-X.
