= John Joe McGee =

Provisional Irish Republican Army member

John Joe McGee (1929–2002, Dundalk, County Louth, Ireland) was an IRA volunteer who was formerly in the British Special Boat Service.

== Background ==
McGee had served as a commando in the British Royal Marines prior to becoming a member of the Special Boat Service, before joining the Irish Republican Army sometime in the 1970s. He thereafter became involved with the Provisional IRA's 'nutting squad', the Internal Security Unit. He became its leader for around a decade between the mid-1980s and the mid-1990s. Between forty and fifty of those investigated by the unit were also executed as suspected informers or alleged British agents. Its sentences could only be countermanded by a member of the IRA Army Council. Members of the unit included Eamon Collins, Freddie Scappaticci, and "Kevin Fulton". During a court appearance, Fulton stated:

In 1979 I was approached by the Intelligence Corps, a branch of the British Army, whilst serving with my regiment the Royal Irish Rangers in Northern Ireland. I was asked to infiltrate a terrorist group, namely the PIRA, during this time as part of my undercover work for the Force Research Unit. I was active in the commission of terrorist acts and crimes … During this time my handlers were fully conversant with my activities and had guided me in my work which included the security section of the PIRA. The commanding officer of this section was John Joe Magee, a former member of the Special Boat Squadron. The purpose of this unit was solely to hunt out agents and informers of the British state. The suspected agents would be … tortured and murdered after obtaining any information.

Eamon Collins (later killed by the IRA) quoted a conversation he had with McGee and Scappaticci in his book Killing Rage:

I asked whether they always told people that they were going to be shot. Scap said it depended on the circumstances. He turned to John Joe (his boss, John Joe Magee) and started joking about one informer who had confessed after being offered an amnesty. Scap told the man he would take him home, reassuring him he had nothing to worry about. Scap had told him to keep the blindfold on for security reasons as they walked from the car. "It was funny," he (Scap) said, "watching the bastard stumbling and falling, asking me as he felt his way along railings and walls, "Is this my house now?" and I'd say, "No, not yet, walk on some more ..." " 'And then you shot the fucker in the back of the head," said John Joe, and both of them burst out laughing.

== See also ==
- Internal Security Unit
- Stakeknife
- Murder of Jean McConville
- Murders of Catherine and Gerard Mahon
- Joseph Fenton
- Murder of Thomas Oliver
- Force Research Unit
