= Murder of Eamon Ryan =

1979 murder in Ireland

Eamon Ryan (1946/47 – 7 August 1979) was an Irish civil servant and murder victim. He and his wife Bernadette had two children, Peter and Dorothy.

Ryan had been studying for a master's degree at Trinity College, Dublin. On 7 August 1979, he was in the Allied Irish Bank in Tramore, County Waterford, when it was raided by the Provisional IRA. Eamonn Nolan and Aaron O'Connell were later found guilty of his murder and given life sentences. The getaway driver, Bill Hayes, served nine years in prison. Ryan's death became the subject of media attention in 2013 when his family criticized Sinn Féin for giving an award to Hayes. In reply, Hayes said he wanted to offer his deep sympathy and apologies to Eamon Ryan's family for what they had suffered.

== See also ==
- Murder of Mary Travers
- Killing of Patrick Kelly
- Murder of Thomas Oliver
- Killing of Jerry McCabe
- Murder of James Curran
- Murder of Gillian Johnston
