= Gillian Johnston =

Gillian Johnston refers to:

- Murder of Gillian Johnston, a chemist and shop worker from Northern Ireland who was murdered by the IRA, in 1988
- Gillian Johnston (polo player), American polo player and patron
