= Operation Kenova =

Northern Ireland Troubles legacy investigation

Operation Kenova was an independent police investigation into the activities of a British Army Force Research Unit agent codenamed Stakeknife during the Troubles in Northern Ireland. It examined whether there was evidence of criminal offences by the alleged agent, by members of the Provisional Irish Republican Army (IRA), and by members of the British Army, the security and intelligence services, police or other state personnel.

The investigation was established under former Bedfordshire Police chief constable Jon Boutcher, who led it until his appointment as Chief Constable of the Police Service of Northern Ireland in 2023. It was subsequently led by Sir Iain Livingstone, former chief constable of Police Scotland.

Kenova published an interim report on its Stakeknife investigation in March 2024 and a final report in December 2025. The final report also included findings from related investigations and reviews: Operation Mizzenmast, concerning the murder of Jean Smyth-Campbell; Operation Turma, concerning the murders of three RUC officers; and Operation Denton, concerning the Glenanne series.

== Background ==
Stakeknife was the codename of a high-level British Army agent within the IRA. He was suspected of involvement in abductions, interrogations, torture and murders carried out by the IRA's Internal Security Unit (ISU), also known as the "Nutting Squad". Stakeknife has been widely reported to have been Freddie Scappaticci, a Belfast-born IRA member who died in 2023, although successive British governments did not formally identify him because of the policy of neither confirm nor deny (NCND).

Kenova's terms of reference were to establish whether there was evidence of criminal offences by the alleged agent, including murder, attempted murder and unlawful imprisonment attributed to the IRA, and whether criminal offences had been committed by members of the British Army, the security services or other government personnel.

Early media reporting on the investigation focused on whether the Royal Ulster Constabulary (RUC) had failed to investigate murders in order to protect Stakeknife's identity. Kenova later described its remit more broadly as including potential criminality by the alleged agent, IRA members, police, soldiers, intelligence handlers and other state personnel.

== Conduct of the investigation ==
The investigation was led by Boutcher through a team independent of the Police Service of Northern Ireland (PSNI). Its work included criminal investigation, intelligence analysis, disclosure review, forensic work and engagement with victims' families.

In July 2021, Kenova investigators announced that they had obtained new DNA evidence relating to the murder of Thomas Oliver, a County Louth farmer abducted and murdered by the IRA in 1991 after being falsely accused of being an informer.

In 2020, Boutcher expressed concern about government proposals to close or restrict many Troubles legacy investigations, saying that any new process would need to comply with legal obligations and command public confidence.

== Interim report ==
Kenova's interim report was published on 8 March 2024. It made ten recommendations concerning the handling of Troubles legacy cases, including recommendations about a new statutory framework, review and resourcing of the Public Prosecution Service for Northern Ireland, reconsideration of the NCND policy, classification and disclosure of previous reports, and apologies by the British government and republican leadership.

The interim report rejected claims that Stakeknife saved hundreds of lives. It estimated that the number of identifiable lives saved by intelligence attributable to Stakeknife was between high single figures and low double figures, and concluded that it was probable that more lives were lost than saved as a result of his continued operation as an agent. Boutcher said that the alleged agent was involved in serious criminality and should have been prosecuted while alive.

The report also criticised state agencies for failures in the handling of agents and in the investigation of murders during the Troubles. It emphasised the need to place victims and families at the centre of legacy processes.

== Undisclosed MI5 material ==
In August 2024, Livingstone wrote to the Secretary of State for Northern Ireland, Hilary Benn, after MI5 identified additional material relating to Stakeknife that had not previously been disclosed to Kenova. RTÉ reported that several hundred pages of previously unseen files had been found and that their assessment delayed publication of the final report. BBC News reported that Baroness O'Loan, a member of Kenova's steering committee, criticised MI5 over the late disclosure and said that the new material could affect what families had previously been told.

The final report later recorded that difficulties with access to MI5 material had affected the investigation, although Kenova had earlier believed that the problems related to process rather than intentional withholding.

== Final report ==
Kenova's final report was published on 9 December 2025. The PSNI said the report covered Operation Kenova, Operation Mizzenmast, Operation Turma and Operation Denton. The report said that nine years after Kenova had been established, its work had shown that historical investigations could still provide answers to families, although criminal prosecutions would often be difficult because of the passage of time.

The final report reaffirmed the interim report's conclusion that more lives were probably lost than saved by Stakeknife's continued operation as an agent. It also criticised the continued refusal to confirm or deny Stakeknife's identity and called for the government to allow the agent to be named.

The British government responded on the day of publication. Benn said that the government would provide a final response to Kenova's request to name Stakeknife after judgment in litigation concerning the NCND policy, and said the government's first duty was to protect national security.

In February 2026, the Northern Ireland Affairs Committee published a report calling on the government to formally name Stakeknife. The committee said that Kenova had been unable to confirm Stakeknife's identity because the government had refused authorisation, and that successive governments had relied on NCND.

== Operation Denton ==
Operation Denton, also known as the Barnard Review, was a related review concerning the Glenanne series of loyalist attacks and alleged security-force collusion. It arose from litigation concerning the activities of the so-called Glenanne gang, a term used to describe a network of loyalist paramilitaries and members of the security forces linked to attacks in the 1970s.

In May 2024, ahead of the 50th anniversary of the Dublin and Monaghan bombings, Livingstone said that there was no doubt that collusion had occurred in the Glenanne series, and that Operation Denton would define its character, nature and extent.

The high-level Operation Denton findings were published as part of the Kenova final report in December 2025. Livingstone said that there had been "deplorable collusion" between loyalist paramilitaries and some serving police officers and members of the military, but that no evidence was found that it had been directed at a political or strategic level. The report found that the term "Glenanne Gang" had become a shorthand for the activities of a wider network of loyalist paramilitary groups, primarily the Ulster Volunteer Force and Mid-Ulster UVF acting with corrupt members of the security forces, including the RUC and Ulster Defence Regiment.

== Reception and responses ==
Following the interim report in March 2024, Michelle O'Neill, the First Minister of Northern Ireland, reiterated an apology for all lives lost during the Troubles. The then foreign secretary, David Cameron, said the government would await the final report before taking decisions.

After the final report in December 2025, Benn commended Kenova's work and said it had set a standard for future legacy investigations. He described the behaviour reported in relation to the alleged agent as deeply disturbing and said that modern agent-handling practice was subject to stricter regulation.

== See also ==
- Freddie Scappaticci
- Stakeknife
- Force Research Unit
- Murder of Thomas Oliver
- Dublin and Monaghan bombings
- Glenanne gang
