= Eamonn Ryan =

Eamonn or Eamon Ryan may refer to:

- Eamon Ryan (born 1963), former leader of the Irish Green Party, minister for transport and environment
- Éamonn Ryan (born 1942), Gaelic football manager and player
- Eamon Ryan, Irish civil servant and murder victim, see Murder of Eamon Ryan
