= Peter Smithwick =

Irish judge (1937–2022)

Peter Smithwick (15 February 1937 – 8 March 2022) was an Irish judge who served as chairman and the sole member of the Smithwick Tribunal, a Tribunal of Inquiry into the events surrounding the killing of Chief Superintendent Harry Breen and Superintendent Robert Buchanan of the Royal Ulster Constabulary (RUC).

Smithwick was born on 15 February 1937. Prior to his appointment as Chairman of the Smithwick Tribunal in 2005, he was President of the District Court for 17 years.

Smithwick was a director and the ninth generation of his family to be associated with Smithwick's, the famous beer brewed by his family firm. He appears to have been extremely well-liked and respected. He was a Freeman of the city of Kilkenny.

He grew up in Kilcreene Lodge, and was educated at Castleknock College and University College Dublin. His family was prominent as part of the landed gentry of County Kilkenny, Leinster, Ireland.

Smithwick died on 8 March 2022, at the age of 85.
