= Eamon Collins =

Irish republican; memoirist, writer (1954-1999)

Eamon Collins (1954 – 27 January 1999) was a Provisional Irish Republican Army member in the late 1970s and early 1980s. He turned his back on the organisation in the late 1980s, and later co-authored a book called Killing Rage detailing his experiences within it. In January 1999 he was waylaid on a public road and murdered near his home in Newry in Northern Ireland.

== Early life ==
He was born in Camlough, County Armagh, his parents being Brian Collins and his wife Kathleen Cumiskey; his farmer father dealt in livestock, and was involved in cattle smuggling. Camlough, on the outskirts of Newry, was a small, staunchly Irish republican town in South Armagh. Despite the sentiment of the area, the Collins family had no association and little interest in Irish Nationalist politics. Kathleen Collins was a devout Catholic, and he was brought up under her influence with a sense of awe for the martyrs of that religion in Irish history, in its conflicts with Protestantism.

After completing his schooling, Collins worked for a time in the Ministry of Defence in a clerical capacity in London before studying law at Queen's University Belfast, where he became influenced by Marxist political ideology. In Easter 1974, as he walked home to his parents' home in South Armagh during a break from his studies in Belfast, on arrival he found both his parents being manhandled by soldiers of the Parachute Regiment during a house-to-house raid searching for illegal weapons, and on remonstrating with them Collins was himself assaulted, and both he and his father were arrested and detained. Collins later attributed his crossing of the psychological threshold of actively supporting Irish Republican paramilitarism to this incident. Another factor in his radicalization at this time was an English law tutor at university who had persuaded him that the newly formed Provisional Irish Republican Army was a means of opposing the British military presence in Northern Ireland, as well as a vehicle for Marxist revolutionary politics, in line with the radical ideological expression of a younger generation in the IRA in the late 1970s that were now replacing an old guard which was more Catholic and nationalist.

Collins subsequently dropped out of university, and after working in a pub for a period, he joined Her Majesty's Customs & Excise Service, serving in Newry, and would go on to use this internal position within the administrative machinery of the British Government to support IRA operations against British security forces.

Around this time he married Bernadette, with whom he subsequently had four children.

== IRA activity ==
Collins joined the Provisional IRA during the blanket protest by Long Kesh inmates in the late 1970s, which sought Special Category Status for Irish Republican paramilitary prisoners, and he became involved in street demonstrations at this time. He joined the "South Down Brigade" of the IRA, being active in one of its units based around Newry. This brigade sometimes worked alongside the "South Armagh Brigade", which was the IRA's most effective unit during the troubles. Psychologically unsuited to physical violence, Collins was appointed instead by the IRA as its South Down Brigade's intelligence officer. This role involved gathering information on members of the Crown security forces personnel and installations for targeting in gun and bomb attacks. His planning was directly responsible for at least five deaths, including that of Major Ivan Toombs of the Ulster Defence Regiment in January 1981, with whom Collins worked in the Customs Station at Warrenpoint, and possibly three times that number. Many of the bombing targets of his unit were of limited scale, such as the wrecking of Newry Public Library, and a public house where a Royal Ulster Constabulary (RUC) choir drank after practice.

Collins became noted within IRA circles for his hard-line views on the continuance of the armed campaign, and later joined its Internal Security Unit. At the instigation of the South Armagh Brigade's leadership, he became a member of Sinn Féin in Newry. The South Armagh IRA wanted a hard-line militarist in the local party, as they were opposed to the increasing emphasis of the Republican leadership on political over military activity. Collins was not selected as a Sinn Féin candidate for local government elections, in part, due to his open expressions of suspicion of the IRA and Sinn Féin leadership, whom he accused of covertly moving towards a position of an abandonment of the IRA's military campaign. Around this time Collins had a confrontation with Gerry Adams at the funeral of an IRA man killed in a failed bombing attack over how to deal with the funeral's policing, where Collins accused Adams of being a "Stickie" (a derogatory slang term for the Official IRA).

Despite his militarist convictions at this time, Collins found the psychological strain caused by his involvement in the IRA's war increasingly difficult to deal with. His belief in the martial discipline of IRA's campaign had been seriously undermined by the murder of Norman Hanna, a 28-year-old Newry man on 11 March 1982. Hanna, who had been targeted because of his former service with the Ulster Defence Regiment after resigning in 1976, was killed in front of his wife and young daughter. Collins had opposed the targeting of Hanna on the basis that it wasn't of a governmental entity, but had been over-ruled by his superiors, and he had gone along with the operation; his conscience burdened him afterwards about it though. His uneasy state was further augmented by being arrested under anti-terrorism laws on two occasions, the second involving his detention at Gough Barracks in Armagh for a week, where he was subject to extensive sessions of interrogation in 1985 after an IRA mortar attack in Newry, which had claimed the lives of multiple police officers. Collins had not been involved in this operation, but after five days of incessant psychological pressure being exerted by R.U.C. specialist police officers, during which he had not said a word, he mentally broke, and yielded detailed information to the police about the organisation. As a result of his arrest he was dismissed from his career with H.M. Customs & Excise Service.

Collins subsequently stated that the strain of the interrogation merely exacerbated increasing doubts that he had already possessed about the moral justification of the IRA's paramilitary campaign and his actions within it. These doubts had been made worse by the strategic view that he had come to that the organisation's senior leadership had in the early 1980s quietly decided that the war had failed, and was now slowly manoeuvering the movement away from a military campaign to allow its political wing Sinn Féin to pursue its purposes by another means in what would become the Northern Ireland peace process. This negated in Collins' mind the justification for its then on-going military actions.

== Statements against the IRA ==
After his confession of involvement in IRA activity, Collins became an RUC informant (or "Supergrass", in contemporary media language), upon whose evidence the authorities were able to prosecute a large number of IRA members. He was incarcerated in specialized protective custody, along with other paramilitaries who had after arrest given evidence against their organisations, in the Crumlin Road Prison in Belfast from 1985 to 1987. However, after an appeal from his wife who remained an IRA supporter, and on receiving a message from the IRA delivered by his brother on a visit to the prison, Collins legally retracted his evidence, in return for which he was given a guarantee of safety by the IRA provided he consented to being debriefed by it. He agreed, and was in consequence transferred by the authorities to the Irish Republican paramilitary wing of the prison.

== Trial for murder ==
As a result of losing his previous legal status as a Crown protected witness, Collins was charged with several counts of murder and attempted murder. However, on being tried in 1987 he was acquitted as the statement in which he had admitted to involvement in these acts was ruled legally inadmissible by the court, as it was judged that it had been obtained under duress and was not supported by enough conclusive corroboratory evidence to allow a legally sound conviction. On release from prison he spent several weeks being counter-interrogated by the IRA's Internal Security Unit to discover what had been revealed to the authorities, after which he was exiled by the organisation from the northern part of Ireland, being warned that if he was found north of Drogheda after a certain date he would be summarily executed by it. The technical acquittal in the Crown court based upon judicial legal principles made an impact upon Collins' view of the British state, markedly contrasting with what he had witnessed in the IRA's Internal Security Unit, and reinforced his disillusionment with Irish Republican paramilitarism.

== Post-IRA life ==
After his exile Collins moved to Dublin and squatted for a while in a deserted flat in the impoverished Ballymun area of the city. At the time the area was experiencing an epidemic of heroin addiction and he volunteered to help a local priest Peter McVerry, who ran programmes for local youths to try to keep them away from drugs. After several years in Dublin, he subsequently moved to Edinburgh in Scotland for a period, where he ran a youth centre. He would later write that because of his Ulster background, he felt closer culturally to Scottish people than people from further south in Ireland.

In 1995 he returned to live in Newry, a district known for the militancy of its communal support of the IRA, with numerous IRA members in its midst. The IRA order exiling him had not been lifted, but with a formal ceasefire from the organisation in operation ordered by its senior command, and in the sweeping changes that were underway with renunciations of violence by all the paramilitary organisations in Northern Ireland that had followed on from it, he judged it safer to move back in with his wife and children who had never left Newry.

== Broadcasting and published works ==
Having returned to live in Newry, rather than maintaining a low profile Collins decided to take a prominent role in the ongoing transition of Northern Ireland's society, using his personal history as a platform in the media to analyze the adverse effects of terrorism. In 1995 he appeared in an ITV television documentary entitled "Confession", giving an account of his disillusioning experiences and a bleak insight into Irish Republican paramilitarism. In 1997 he co-authored Killing Rage, with journalist Mick McGovern, a biographical account of his life and IRA career. He also contributed to the book Bandit Country by Toby Harnden about the South Armagh IRA. At the same time in the media he called for the re-introduction of internment after the Omagh bombing for those continuing to engage in such acts; published newspaper articles openly denouncing and ridiculing the Real IRA's campaign, alongside publicly analyzing his own past role in such activity, and the damage that it had caused on a personal and social level to the two communities of Northern Ireland.

== Witness evidence against Thomas Murphy ==
In May 1998, Collins gave evidence against leading republican Thomas "Slab" Murphy, in a libel case Murphy had brought against the Sunday Times, over a 1985 article naming him as the IRA's Northern Commander. Murphy denied IRA membership, but Collins took the witness stand against him, and testified that from personal experience he knew that Murphy had been a key military leader in the organisation. Murphy subsequently lost the libel case and sustained substantial financial losses in consequence.

After giving his testimony, Collins had said in the court-room to Murphy "No hard feelings Slab". However, soon after the trial, Collins' home was attacked and daubed with graffiti calling him a "tout", a slang word for an informer in Irish Republican circles. After his return to Newry in 1995 his home there had been intermittently subjected to acts of petty vandalism, but after the Murphy trial these intensified in regularity and severity, and another house belonging to his family in Camlough, in which no one was resident, was destroyed by arson. Threats were made against his children, and they faced persecution in school from elements among their peers. Graffiti threatening him with murder was also daubed on the walls of the streets in the vicinity of the family home in Newry.

== Death ==
Collins was beaten and stabbed to death by an unidentified assailant(s) early in the morning of 27 January 1999, whilst walking his dogs near the Barcroft Park Estate in Newry along a quiet stretch of country lane at Doran's Hill, just within sight of Sliabh gCuircin (Camlough Mountain). His body also bore marks of having been struck by a car moving at speed. The subsequent police investigation and Coroner's Inquest commented upon the extremity of weaponed violence to Collins' head and face used during the attack.

Rumoured reasons behind the murder were that he had returned to Northern Ireland in breach of the IRA's banning order, and further he had detailed IRA activities and publicly criticized in the media a multiplicity of Irish Republican paramilitary splinter groups that had appeared after the Provisional IRA's 1994 ceasefire, and that he had testified in court against Murphy. Gerry Adams stated the murder was "regrettable", but added that Collins had "many enemies in many places".

After a traditional Irish wake, with a closed coffin necessitated due to the damage to his face, and a funeral service at St. Catherine's Dominican Church in Newry, Collins' body was buried at the town's Monkshill Cemetery, not far from the grave of Albert White, a Catholic former RUC inspector, whose assassination he helped to organise in 1982.

== Subsequent criminal investigations ==
In January 2014, the Police Service of Northern Ireland (PSNI) released a statement that a re-examination of the evidence from the scene of the 1999 murder had revealed new DNA material of a potential perpetrator's presence, and made a public appeal for information, detailing the involvement of a specific car model (a white coloured Hyundai Pony), and a compass pommel that had broken off a hunting knife during the attack and had been left behind at the scene. In February 2014, detectives from the Serious Crime Branch arrested a 59-year-old man at an address in Newry in relation to the murder; he was subsequently released without charge. In September 2014, the PSNI arrested three men, aged 56, 55 and 42, in County Armagh in relation to inquiries into the murder, all of whom were subsequently released without charges after questioning. In January 2019, the PSNI released a statement regarding the murder that one of the assailants of Collins had been seriously injured by an accidentally sustained knife wound during the attack, and had left traces of his own blood at the scene, and that recent scientific advances in DNA evidence had increased the possibility of his identification. In May 2019, three men aged 60 to 62 were arrested and questioned, but then released unconditionally.

== Publications ==
- Killing Rage (1997)

== See also ==
- Internal Security Unit
- Stakeknife
- Freddie Scappaticci
- Murder of Thomas Oliver
