= Jon Boutcher =

British police officer

Chief Constable Jon Boutcher QPM
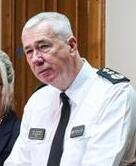
- Boutcher in 2024

Chief Constable of the Police Service of Northern Ireland
- Incumbent
- Assumed office 12 October 2023
- Deputy: Mark Hamilton; Bobby Singleton
- Preceded by: Simon Byrne

Personal details
- Born: Jonathan Michael Boutcher; 10 October 1965 (age 60)
- Education: University of Cambridge
- Profession: Police officer

Jonathan Michael Boutcher QPM (born 10 October 1965) is a British senior police officer. He was appointed as Chief Constable of the Police Service of Northern Ireland (PSNI) on 7 November 2023.

== Early life and education ==
Boutcher was born on 10 October 1965 in Derby, Derbyshire, England. He was educated at Spondon School in Derby. He later studied applied criminology and police management at Wolfson College, Cambridge, graduating with a Master of Studies (MSt) degree in 2015. His thesis was titled "Understanding Cybercrime and the Cybercriminal".

== Career ==
Boutcher was a Metropolitan Police Cadet in 1983, before becoming a police constable in the Metropolitan Police Service in 1984. He became a detective, reaching the rank of detective chief superintendent. In 2003, he joined the Anti-Terrorist Branch. He was a senior commander in the Metropolitan Police operation that saw Jean Charles de Menezes shot dead in London; he had been misidentified as a suspect in the 21 July 2005 London attempted bombings.

In 2011, he reached chief officer rank, serving as assistant chief constable of Hertfordshire Constabulary and leader of the Bedfordshire, Cambridgeshire, and Hertfordshire Joint Protective Services Command. In 2014, he moved to Bedfordshire Police as deputy chief constable. He then served as chief constable of the force from 2015 until April 2019.

From 2019 to 2023, he led Operation Kenova, a series of historical investigations into murders which occurred during the Troubles in Northern Ireland. Kenova published its interim report outlining its findings on 8 March 2024. He was succeeded as head of the operation by Iain Livingstone in 2023.

He served as interim chief constable of the Police Service of Northern Ireland (PSNI) from 12 October 2023 whilst the recruitment process was ongoing to appoint someone permanently. On 7 November 2023, it was announced that the appointment had been made permanent by the Northern Ireland Policing Board. He receives a salary of £220,000.

Boutcher was awarded the Queen's Police Medal (QPM) in the 2015 Birthday Honours.
