= Jo Farrell =

British police officer (born 1968)

Chief Constable Jo Farrell KPM
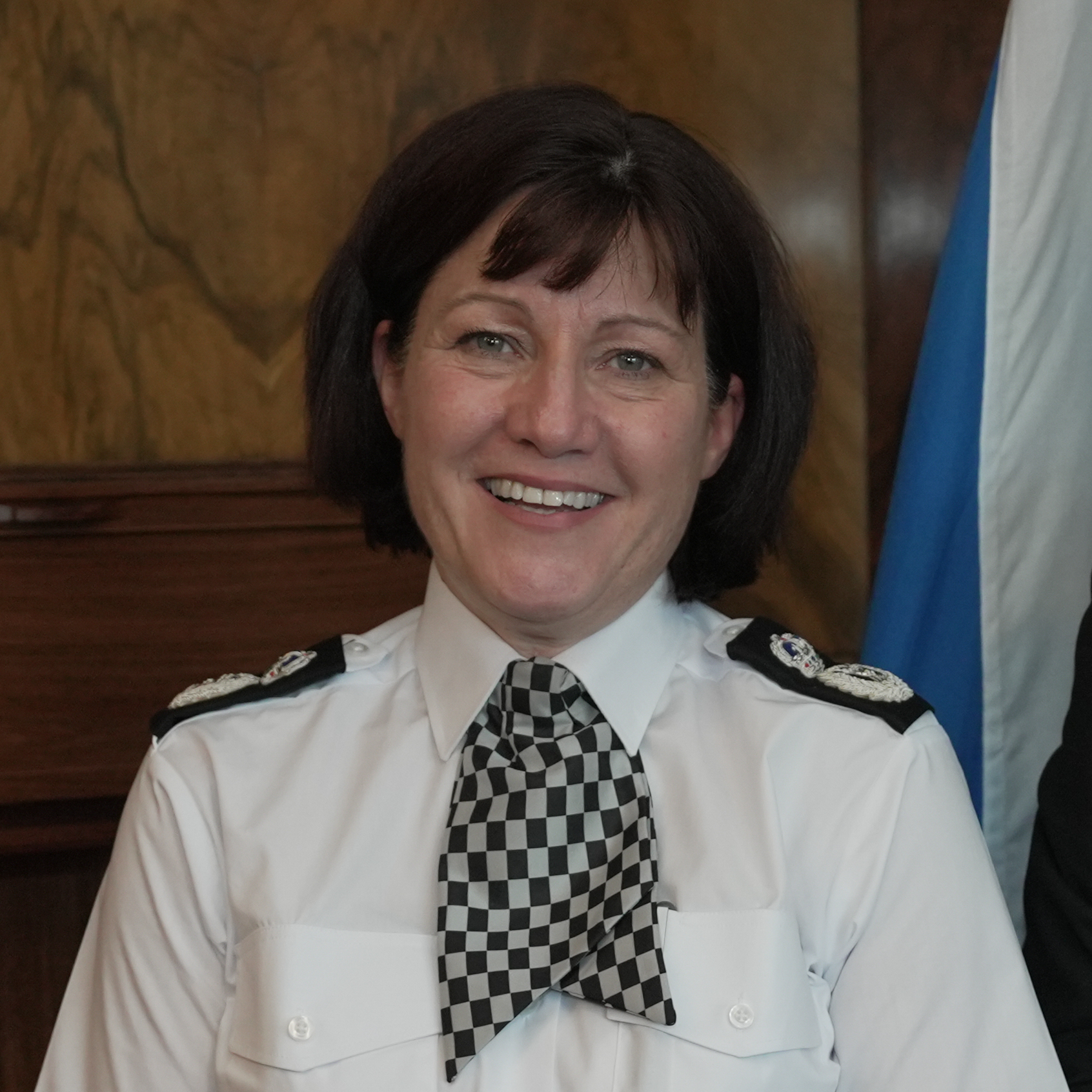
- Farrell in 2023

Chief Constable of Police Scotland
- Incumbent
- Assumed office 9 October 2023
- Preceded by: Iain Livingstone

Chief Constable of Durham Constabulary
- In office June 2019 – October 2023
- Preceded by: Michael Barton

Personal details
- Born: September 1968 (age 57) Wirral, Cheshire, England
- Education: Sheffield Hallam University, Fitzwilliam College, Cambridge
- Profession: Police officer

Joanna Farrell KPM (born September 1968) is a British police officer and Chief Constable of Police Scotland. She was appointed as Police Scotland's first female Chief Constable, replacing Sir Iain Livingstone who retired in August 2023.

== Life ==
Farrell was born in Wirral, Cheshire, and moved to Cambridge at the age of 15 when her father relocated there for work. After achieving a degree in Business Studies at Sheffield Polytechnic, she joined Cambridgeshire Police as a Police Constable in 1991, at the age of 22. She was promoted five years later, and in 2002, moved to Northumbria Police to take up the role of Chief Inspector, and was later promoted to Assistant Chief Constable. From 2011, she studied part-time on the Police Executive Programme at Fitzwilliam College, Cambridge. She joined Durham Constabulary in 2016, and was appointed as its first female Chief Constable in 2019. During her tenure as Chief Constable of Durham, the force introduced a new approach to dealing with rape suspects, and during the COVID-19 pandemic investigated Labour Party leader Sir Keir Starmer for a potential breach of COVID-19 regulations.

Farrell's appointment as Chief Constable of Police Scotland was made by the Scottish Police Authority following the announcement that Iain Livingstone would retire from the role in August 2023. Her appointment was confirmed by Angela Constance, Scotland's Cabinet Secretary for Justice, on 14 June 2023. She was the first woman to lead the Scottish force when she assumed that role in October 2023. Her previous force is one of the smallest in the UK, while Police Scotland is the second-largest.

In December 2023 she announced that Police Scotland would begin rolling out the use of body cameras from summer 2024.

Farrell was awarded the King's Police Medal (KPM) in the 2026 New Year Honours.

== Honours ==

Ribbon	Description	Notes
	King's Police Medal	2026 New Year Honours
	Queen Elizabeth II Golden Jubilee Medal	2002; UK version of this medal
	Queen Elizabeth II Diamond Jubilee Medal	2012; UK version of this medal
	Queen Elizabeth II Platinum Jubilee Medal	2022; UK version of this medal
	King Charles III Coronation Medal	2023; UK version of this medal
	Police Long Service and Good Conduct Medal	

Police appointments
Preceded by Iain Livingstone	Chief Constable of Police Scotland; 2023–present	Incumbent
