= District Court (Ireland) =

Irish summary jurisdiction court

The District Court (Irish: An Chúirt Dúiche) is the lowest court in the Irish court system and the main court of summary jurisdiction in Ireland. It has responsibility for hearing minor criminal matters, small civil claims, liquor licensing, and certain family law applications. It is also responsible for indicting the accused and sending them forward for trial at the Circuit Court and Central Criminal Court.

== Jurisdiction ==
The District Court is a court of local and limited jurisdiction.

The civil jurisdiction is limited to damages not exceeding €15,000; the court has no equitable jurisdiction.

The court has the power to renew licences for the sale of intoxicating liquor and grant licences for lotteries.

The family jurisdiction of the court includes the power to award guardianship, grant protection or barring orders, and award maintenance of up to €150 a week per child, €500 per week for a spouse or a lump sum up to €15,000.

The criminal jurisdiction is limited to summary offences – i.e. offences heard without a jury where the maximum punishment is 12 months imprisonment. Indictable offences may also be tried by the court provided the accused, the judge and the Director of Public Prosecutions agree. In such a case the maximum penalty imposed by the judge for the indictable offence can not exceed 12 months imprisonment. Murder, treason, rape and aggravated sexual assault are crimes that can not be disposed of summarily in such a manner. Bail hearings for offences triable by both the District Court itself and the Circuit Court are heard here also with a right to appeal to the High Court for a refusal to grant bail. Most of the offences are usually minor as the more serious cases are sent to the Circuit Court and Central Criminal Court. The District Court continues to hold indictment hearings for the more senior criminal court, although since 1967, the court no longer has any discretion whether or not to send forward the accused, as long as the DPP serves a book of evidence on the accused.

== Appeals ==
All judgements of the District Court in both civil and criminal trials can be appealed to a de novo hearing in front of the Circuit Court. The decisions of a District Court judge can also be judicially reviewed by the High Court.

== Organisation ==
The court consists of a president and sixty-three judges. Although, strictly speaking, there is just one District Court, in reality for the purposes of the administration of justice the country is divided into a Dublin Metropolitan District (covering the same area as the Garda Síochána's Dublin Metropolitan Area) and 23 District Court areas. At least one judge is assigned to each District Court area and a significant number of judges are normally assigned to the Dublin Metropolitan District. The District Court sitting in a particular location is normally referred to as (name of town) District Court, e.g. Tullamore District Court.

=== Judges ===
Judges of the District Court, other than the President, are styled e.g. Judge John Smith (or sometimes, as District Judge John Smith, or simply Judge Smith) and addressed in court as "judge" (Irish: A Bhreithimh). Prior to the Courts Act 1991, judges of the District Court were known as justices of the District Court or commonly as district justices and styled e.g. District Justice John Smith or Justice Smith (N.B. not Mr Justice Smith as this was and is the style of a superior court judge).

The President, as an ex-officio judge of the Circuit Court, is entitled to the style of a circuit judge, so is styled e.g. His/Her Honour Judge Smith instead.

== President of the District Court ==
The President of the District Court was established under the Courts (Supplemental Provisions) Act 1961 Part 4.

Name	Term of office
Peter Smithwick	1988–2005
Miriam Malone	2005–2012
Rosemary Horgan	2012–2019
Colin Daly	2019–2021
Paul Kelly	2021–present

== Children Court ==
The Children Court is an ancillary court of District Court, whose role is to deal with minor offences and most indictable offences where the defendant is below the age of 18.

The Dublin Metropolitan Area has its own permanently sitting Children Court centre in Smithfield, Dublin, while across the rest of the country the Children Court usually sits in the same location as the District Court, but on different times and days.

== History ==
The current District Court was established in 1961. However, the jurisdiction vested in it stems from the earlier courts of petty sessions. Petty sessions were originally held by justices of the peace, who were lay people (and in Ireland, typically members of the Protestant Ascendancy), as preliminary hearings for quarter sessions and the assizes). From 1836, the justices acted under the supervision of resident magistrates. The Petty Sessions (Ireland) Act 1851 regulated petty sessions, organising the country into petty sessions districts and providing for the appointment of clerks of petty sessions. A series of Summary Jurisdiction (Ireland) Acts, beginning in 1851, vested petty sessions with summary jurisdiction in minor criminal matters. Both these Acts are still on the statute book, though heavily amended. In Dublin, the divisional magistrates exercised similar power to petty sessions under the Dublin Police Acts.

During the War of Independence, the Royal Irish Constabulary retreated to barracks, and petty sessions could not be held in most of the country. A system of Dáil Courts was set up by the First Dáil to replace them. A Dáil parish court exercised summary jurisdiction in IRA-controlled areas. After the outbreak of the Irish Civil War, however, the Provisional Government decided to "revert" to the British courts, pending the report of a commission headed by Lord Glenavy on what would replace them. It decided, however, immediately to make changes to summary jurisdiction by dismissing all remaining resident magistrates and terminating the commissions of justices of the peace, many of whom had resigned anyway. It then proceeded to appoint 27 new resident magistrates who would sit alone without justices of the peace, giving them the title of district justices. The District Justices (Temporary Provisions) Act 1923 changed the name of petty sessions to district courts and confirmed the appointment of the existing district justices. The Dáil parish courts were wound-up separately by the Dáil Éireann Courts (Winding Up) Act 1923.

The District Court of Justice was formally established in 1924, replacing the renamed district courts and the Dublin Metropolitan Police Court. The Courts Acts of 1961 replaced this court with the current District Court.
