= Carál Ní Chuilín =

Principal Deputy Speaker of the Northern Ireland Assembly since 2024

Carál Ní Chuilín MLA
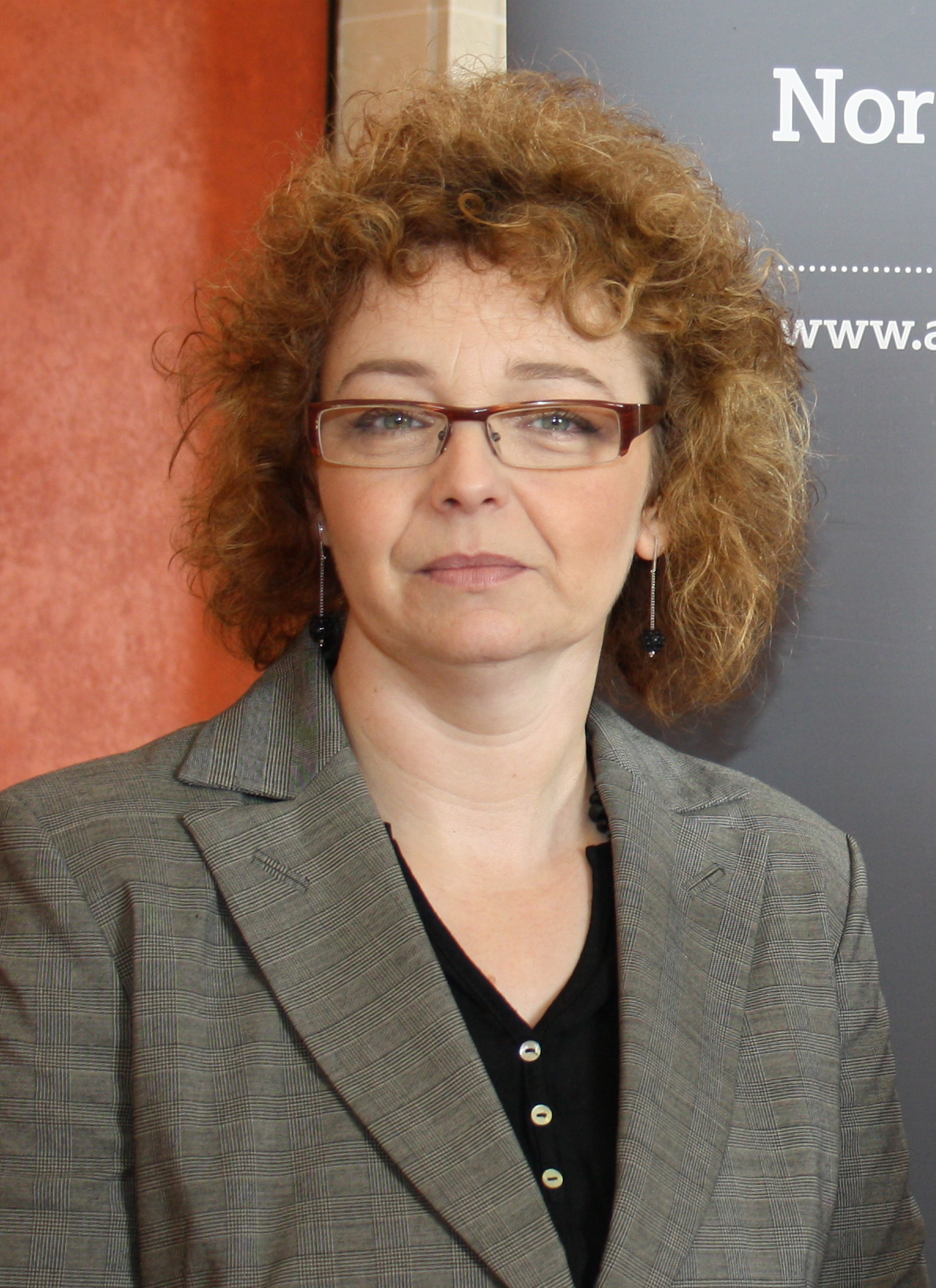
- Ní Chuilín in 2012

Principal Deputy Speaker of the Northern Ireland Assembly
- Incumbent
- Assumed office 6 February 2024
- Preceded by: Christopher Stalford

Minister for Communities
- In office 15 June 2020 – 16 December 2020
- First Minister: Arlene Foster
- Preceded by: Deirdre Hargey
- Succeeded by: Deirdre Hargey

Minister of Culture, Arts and Leisure
- In office 5 May 2011 – 6 May 2016
- First Minister: Peter Robinson; Arlene Foster
- Preceded by: Nelson McCausland
- Succeeded by: Office abolished

Member of the Northern Ireland Assembly for Belfast North
- Incumbent
- Assumed office 7 March 2007
- Preceded by: Kathy Stanton

Member of Belfast City Council
- In office 5 May 2005 – 7 March 2007
- Preceded by: Eoin Ó Broin
- Succeeded by: Conor Maskey
- Constituency: Oldpark

Personal details
- Born: Caroline Cullen; 18 December 1964 (age 61) New Lodge, Belfast, Northern Ireland
- Party: Sinn Féin
- Spouse: Gerard Magee
- Education: Open University; Queen's University Belfast
- Website: Official website

Carál Ní Chuilín MLA (Irish pronunciation: [kəˈɾˠaːl̪ˠ n̠ʲiː ˈxɪlʲiːnʲ]; born 18 December 1964), formerly known as Caroline Cullen, is an Irish Sinn Féin politician and former Provisional Irish Republican Army (IRA) volunteer serving as the Principal Deputy Speaker of the Northern Ireland Assembly since 2024. She has been a member of the Northern Ireland Assembly for Belfast North since 2007 and served in the Northern Ireland Executive as Minister of Culture, Arts and Leisure until 2016. On 15 June 2020, she was appointed Minister for Communities on a temporary basis, due to the health of the previous minister, Deirdre Hargey.

== Personal life ==
Ní Chuilín was born and raised in the New Lodge area of Belfast. She graduated from the Open University in 1994 with a BSc in Social Studies after completing a degree which she began whilst in prison. She later received a master's degree in Management from Queen's University Belfast.

== Republican activity ==
Ní Chuilín was an active volunteer in the IRA. In 1989, she was arrested after trying to place a booby-trap bomb under the gates of Crumlin Royal Ulster Constabulary station. At Belfast Crown Court the following year, she was convicted of firearm possession, possession of explosives with the intent to endanger life, and attempted murder. Ní Chuilín was sentenced to eight years in prison, but she was released after four years. She worked for ten years as coordinator of Tar Anall, a project for republican ex-prisoners.

In 1999, Ní Chuilín was one of two founding directors of Coiste na nIarchimí, a company described as "the umbrella organisation for republican ex-prisoner self-help groups throughout Ireland". The company was struck off in 2011 after failing to provide accounts, and Ní Chuilín resigned her position.

Ní Chuilín has been active with Sinn Féin since her release from prison and represented the Oldpark electoral area on Belfast City Council from 2005 to 2007, when she was replaced by Conor Maskey following her election to the Northern Ireland Assembly.

== Assembly ==
Ní Chuilín was elected in 2007 to the Northern Ireland Assembly as a Sinn Féin member for North Belfast. Re-elected in 2011, on 17 May 2011 she was elected Minister of Culture, Arts and Leisure by the Assembly under the D'Hondt method.

In this capacity Ní Chuilín became the first senior Sinn Féin representative to attend an association football match involving the Northern Ireland team, when it defeated the Faroe Islands at Windsor Park on 10 August 2011, but she did not attend until after the playing of the Northern Ireland Anthem of "God Save The Queen", and she commended "the very real efforts that have been made by the IFA to tackle sectarianism at their matches".

In September 2011 Ní Chulín's Department launched Líofa 2015, a project aimed at encouraging people in Northern Ireland to learn, teach and speak Irish. Among those taking up the challenge to achieve conversational fluency by 2015 was Judith Gillespie, Deputy Chief Constable of the Police Service of Northern Ireland, and some 1509 other PSNI officers.

In August 2012 Ní Chuilín revealed a £3m investment programme to improve facilities for boxing in Northern Ireland, saying "Over £3m will be invested through Sport NI; it's an initial investment, but it is to make sure that boxing clubs have the facilities that are fit for purpose, because at the minute many of them don't."

In 2011 former IRA prisoner Mary McArdle was appointed Special Adviser to Ní Chuilín. This appointment prompted much public controversy, as McArdle had been convicted of involvement in the murder of Mary Travers and the attempted murder of her father Tom Travers. Ann Travers, sister of Mary, spoke to the press of her anger at the appointment, and repeatedly demanded that McArdle resign. McArdle was later moved from the post, and in June 2013 the Northern Ireland Assembly passed a bill to bar anyone with a serious conviction from being a special political adviser.

Northern Ireland Assembly
Preceded by Kathy Stanton	MLA for Belfast North; 2007–present	Incumbent
Political offices
Preceded by Nelson McCausland	Minister of Culture, Arts and Leisure; 2011–2016	Office abolished
