= West Park School =

Location
- West Road; Spondon; Derby, Derbyshire, DE21 7BT; England; 52.9218°N 1.4136°W

Information
- Type: Academy
- Department for Education URN: 136634 Tables
- Ofsted: Reports
- Headteacher: Scott McGregor
- Gender: Mixed
- Age: 11 to 16
- Website: https://www.westpark.derby.sch.uk/

West Park School is a mixed secondary school located in the Spondon area of Derby in the English county of Derbyshire.

Previously a foundation school administered by Derby City Council, West Park School was converted to academy status on 1 April 2011. However the school continues to coordinate with Derby City Council for admissions. West Park School offers GCSEs and BTECs as programmes of study for pupils.

== Notable former pupils and staff ==
=== Spondon School ===
- Helen Clark, Labour Party MP for Peterborough
- Jon Boutcher, chief constable

=== West Park School ===
- Jamaal Lascelles, a professional footballer who plays for Newcastle United.
- Ben Osborn, a professional footballer who plays for Stockport County.
