= 1989 Jonesborough ambush =

Provisional IRA attack

- Part of The Troubles
- Warrant card photographs of Chief Superintendent Harry Breen (left) and Superintendent Bob Buchanan (right)
- Location: 54°4′25.18″N 6°22′26.38″W; Edenappa Road, outside Jonesborough, County Armagh, Northern Ireland
- Date: 20 March 1989; 15:40 (UTC)
- Attack type: Shooting
- Weapons: (2) .223 Armalite rifles, (1) Ruger Mini-14, (1) 7.62 Short rifle
- Deaths: Chief Superintendent Harry Breen and Superintendent Bob Buchanan of the Royal Ulster Constabulary
- Perpetrator: 1st Battalion Provisional IRA South Armagh Brigade

The Jonesborough ambush took place on 20 March 1989 near the Irish border outside the village of Jonesborough, County Armagh, Northern Ireland. Two senior Royal Ulster Constabulary (RUC) officers, Chief Superintendent Harry Breen and Superintendent Bob Buchanan, were shot dead in an ambush by the Provisional IRA South Armagh Brigade. Breen and Buchanan were returning from an informal cross-border security conference in Dundalk with senior Garda officers when Buchanan's car, a red Vauxhall Cavalier, was flagged down and fired upon by six IRA gunmen, whom the policemen had taken to be British soldiers. Buchanan was killed outright whilst Breen, suffering gunshot wounds, was forced to lie on the ground and shot in the back of the head after he had left the car waving a white handkerchief. They were the highest-ranking RUC officers to be killed during the Troubles.

Nobody has been charged with killing the two officers. There have been allegations that the attack was the result of collusion between the Gardaí and the Provisional IRA. As a result, Canadian judge Peter Cory investigated the killings in 2003; his findings were published in a report. This led to the Irish government setting up the Smithwick Tribunal, a judicial inquiry into the killings which opened in Dublin in June 2011 and published its final report in December 2013. In the Judge Peter Smithwick report he was unable to find direct evidence of collusion but said 'on balance of probability', somebody inside the Dundalk Garda station had passed on information to the IRA regarding the presence of Breen and Buchanan. He added that he was "satisfied there was collusion in the murders".

== Prelude ==
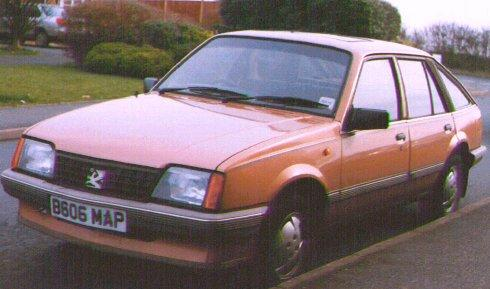
Breen and Buchanan were ambushed in the latter's red Vauxhall Cavalier, similar to this 1985 model

On the afternoon of Monday 20 March 1989, Chief Superintendent Harry Breen (51) and Superintendent Bob Buchanan (55), both high-ranking officers in the Royal Ulster Constabulary (RUC), were returning from an informal security conference with senior officers of equivalent ranks of the Garda Síochána in Dundalk, County Louth, Republic of Ireland. The unscheduled meeting had been arranged that morning by Buchanan over the telephone. (Note: The call was made on an open, unsecured line and there has been speculation at the Smithwick tribunal about the Provisional IRA's ability to tap Garda station telephones.) The meeting began at about 2.10 pm inside the office of Garda Chief Superintendent John Nolan, where they had drawn up plans for "Operation Amazing", the codename for a co-ordinated effort between the RUC and Gardaí against suspected cross-border Provisional IRA smuggling operations allegedly directed by Thomas 'Slab' Murphy . Breen was also due to meet Customs and Excise officials the following morning.

The two RUC officers were travelling without escort in Buchanan's personal unmarked car: a red Vauxhall Cavalier with the registration number KIB 1204 which was not armoured-plated and did not have bullet-proof glass. Buchanan had used this same car on all of his previous visits to Dundalk and other locations in the Republic of Ireland. Both officers were unarmed, as it was illegal to transport weapons into the Republic of Ireland, and they were in plain clothes. Buchanan drove away from the Dundalk Garda station after the meeting had ended at about 3.15 pm and turned off the main Dublin-Belfast road onto the Edenappa Road which is a minor rural road that passes through the village of Jonesborough. Buchanan was known by the British Army to regularly take this route when going to or from Dundalk Garda station.

== Ambush ==
At around 3.40 pm, they crossed the Northern Ireland border at Border Check Point 10 on the Edenappa Road. It was a dark, overcast wintry day. Yards up ahead, at the top of a hill on a tree-lined section of the road just south of Jonesborough, armed members of the Provisional IRA South Armagh Brigade waited to carry out the ambush. The site the IRA chose was in "dead ground", meaning that they could not be seen by the nearby British Army observation post. The secluded back road was considered to be one of the most dangerous in south Armagh and as such, a "no-go area" for the security forces as it was regularly patrolled by the local IRA. According to the Cory Collusion Inquiry Report, as Buchanan reached the hilltop he was flagged down by an armed IRA man standing in the middle of the road wearing Army battle fatigues and camouflage paint on his face. Another armed man, dressed likewise, stood in a ditch by the roadside by four cars he ordered to stop and their drivers to position so only one car could pass the road at a time and slowly at that. Buchanan, because of the location and dress of the two armed men would have had difficulty in ascertaining if it was an IRA or a British Army checkpoint, slowed down and stopped. At that moment, a stolen cream-coloured Litace van, which had been following behind his car, overtook and pulled into the laneway of an empty house opposite. Four more armed IRA men wearing battle fatigues and balaclavas leapt out of the van. They approached the Cavalier and immediately began shooting, mainly at the driver's side, hitting the two officers. Buchanan made two frantic attempts to reverse and escape but his car stalled on each attempt and he was likely already dead before his car came to a rest. Examination of the car the following day found it still to be in reverse gear with Buchanan's foot fully pressed against the accelerator. Breen, despite his gunshot wounds, managed to stumble out of the car, waving a white handkerchief at the gunmen in an apparent gesture of surrender. According to eyewitnesses, one of the gunmen walked over to him, told him to lie on the ground and fired a shot into the back of his head, killing him instantly. Another gunman then approached Buchanan's already dead body in the car and shot him again in the side of the head at point-blank range.

After removing security documents relevant to the meeting with Garda from the Cavalier, and the personal belongings of the two officers, including notes for a history of his church Buchanan had been writing, and a diary containing the contact details of informers and an RUC Assistant Chief Constable (whose house was later bombed) from Breen, the IRA gunmen drove away from the scene of the killings. They were heard by witnesses to have cheered and shouted "Hurrah" as the van sped northwards.

=== Aftermath ===
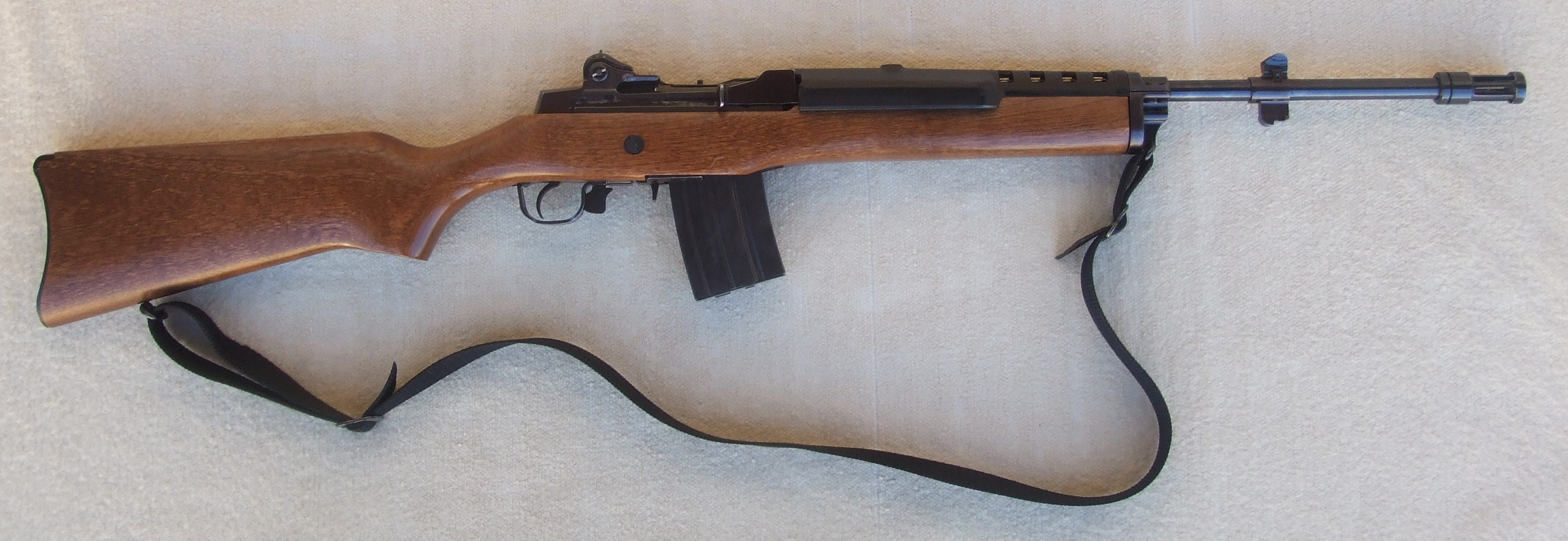
A Ruger Mini-14, like the model shown here, was one of the weapons used to kill officers Breen and Buchanan

The RUC at Forkhill received an emergency call at 3.45 pm reporting that there were two dead men on the Edenappa Road. Police arrived on the scene at 3.54 pm, where they found Breen lying dead on the roadside; alongside the body was his pen, his glasses and the white handkerchief that he had been carrying. His wallet, warrant card and pager were missing. Buchanan's body was behind the wheel of his car, with his seatbelt still fastened. Although the crime scene was cordoned off, the police were unable to remove the bodies or inspect the area due to a sudden snowstorm; therefore, the bodies were not taken away until the following morning after they had been checked for booby-trap bombs. When the security forces inspected the scene, they found Kleenex tissue and a Lucozade bottle, but later forensic tests on the items did not find any fingerprints or saliva. Ballistic testing showed that the weapons used in the attack were two .223 Armalite rifles, one Ruger Mini-14 and a 7.62 Short rifle. A total of 25 rounds had been fired in the attack, 11 of the bullets had struck the car's front windscreen. One of the Armalites had last been used in a helicopter attack at Silverbridge on 23 June 1988 and the other Armalite had been used in the killing of alleged Garda informer Eamonn Maguire on 1 September 1987 at Cullaville. The other two guns were "clean" weapons.

It was learned during the RUC Criminal Investigation Department (CID) investigation that, on the afternoon of the shootings, the IRA had set up four checkpoints on each of the four roads leading out of Dundalk: Dundalk-Omeath, Dundalk-Carrickmacross, Dundalk-Newry, and Dundalk-Jonesborough, where the ambush occurred.

The cream-coloured van was spotted on 22 March by a helicopter patrol, but before the area could be secured for the police to investigate it, the van was destroyed by fire. It was found that it had been stolen from a church car park on 18 March. Although the Provisional IRA claimed responsibility for carrying out the attack, nobody has ever been charged with the killings.

Breen and Buchanan were the highest-ranking RUC officers to be killed during the Troubles.

=== Reactions ===
In a House of Commons parliamentary debate held the day after the killings, unionist politicians, many of whom had been personally acquainted with Breen and Buchanan, criticised the decision to send the unarmed officers to a meeting in Dundalk, a town renowned at the time for its close IRA affiliations.

Judge Cory described the killing of the two officers as: "...brutal, cowardly, and demonstrate a callous insensitivity to both the suffering of individuals and to life itself."

In 2005, in a statement before the Dail, the Irish Minister for Justice, Equality and Law Reform, Michael McDowell, described the killings as "an appalling act of savagery".

== The victims ==
=== Chief Superintendent Harry Breen ===
Harry Breen was a native of the townland of Stragowna, immediately south of the village of Kinawley in the south of County Fermanagh; at the time of his death, he and his wife and children were living in Banbridge in County Down. Breen had been educated at Portora Royal School in Enniskillen. Henry Alexander "Harry" Breen (1938 – 20 March 1989) had joined the RUC on 5 May 1957. He served as a sergeant in Lurgan and then as an inspector in Newry and Banbridge. In 1978, he was targeted by the IRA in an ambush at Sturgan Brae, near Camlough, County Armagh, in which Constable William Turbitt was killed. Breen was promoted to superintendent in 1980. As a superintendent, he held posts in the Complaints and Discipline and Inspectorate Branch. He appeared on television in May 1987 holding a press conference following the Loughgall Ambush in which the Special Air Service shot dead eight IRA members. On 8 February 1988 he was promoted to the rank of Chief Superintendent and became Divisional Commander of the RUC's "H" Division, which was based in the town of Armagh and encompassed the areas of South Armagh and South Down which contained some of the most staunchly Irish republican areas of Northern Ireland. He was well respected within the force and had been commended twice and highly recommended another two times. He was a recipient of the RUC Service Medal and the Police Long-Service and Good Conduct Medal. He was married to June and the father of two children, Gillian and David.

Journalist Joe Tiernan described the six-foot-tall, solidly built Breen as a "hard man" with a cold, remote personality. Breen's former colleagues maintained that he had been a "gentleman of the old school, who always carried a dress handkerchief in his suit pocket". Judge Cory remarked that he was dedicated to the protection of the public and was concerned for the welfare of the RUC officers who served under his command which was an attribute greatly appreciated by them.

Harry Breen was 51. His funeral was held with full police honours at the Church of Ireland Holy Trinity Church in Banbridge on 23 March and was presided over by Archbishop Robin Eames.

An autopsy report found that he had been hit on both the left and right sides of his body. He had been wounded in the head, abdomen, upper-right shoulder and arm.

=== Superintendent Bob Buchanan ===
Robert James "Bob" Buchanan (18 March 1934 – 20 March 1989) was from Bready, County Tyrone. He joined the RUC on 13 August 1956 and was commended on six separate occasions. He had served as a sergeant in Derrygonnelly, County Fermanagh, and in County Antrim where he was promoted to inspector. In 1975, he was promoted to chief inspector and was stationed in Lisburn and held posts in the Complaints and Discipline Department. On promotion to superintendent, he became sub-divisional commander in Omagh and then staff officer to RUC senior command at force headquarters in Belfast. It was in this post in 1985 that he was asked to take on the difficult and dangerous post of Border Superintendent for "H" Division and be responsible for all cross-border matters and liaison between the RUC and the Garda Siochána in the South Armagh/North Louth area. The posts of Border Superintendent had been created by the Anglo-Irish Agreement in an attempt to improve security co-operation between the two Irish police forces. He was scheduled to be transferred to Newtownards the month following his death and his Garda counterpart in Dundalk, Superintendent Pat Tierney, testified to the Smithwick Tribunal he was in a joyous mood on the day he was killed because of the news of his transfer. He was married to Catherine, by whom he had a son, William, and a daughter, Heather, and at time of his death he had two grandsons, Andrew and Robert.

Buchanan had a good relationship with the Gardaí. At the Smithwick Tribunal more than twenty years after his death, several former Garda officers testified they had come to regard him as a personal friend as he frequently visited their stations in his capacity as Border Superintendent. His job also meant that he became known to the Provisional IRA in Dundalk and other towns in County Louth as he would usually travel south in the same car without changing its number plates. He was 5'9 with a large, heavy-set build, and had been described as a man of utter integrity and a dedicated, able and proud police officer who was well respected by his colleagues on both sides of the border. He was also a devout Christian who was a lay Presbyterian preacher at his church in Lisburn. He had written a book on the history of the Kellswater Reformed Presbyterian Church, located outside Ballymena, County Antrim; it was published after his death.

Bob Buchanan had just turned 55 when he was killed. His funeral was held on the same day as Chief Superintendent Breen's, 23 March, at the Reformed Presbyterian Church in Lisburn and was attended by a congregation including RUC Chief Constable Sir John Hermon and many Garda officers. Hermon later blamed Buchanan's belief in predestination, telling Toby Harnden: "The reason they died was so simple. There was no advance preparation, they just went. Bob Buchanan was a very devout Christian and he did not believe in taking precautions because God was in control. He did not follow basic, elementary security procedures."

The autopsy revealed a number of fragment wounds on the right side of his head. He also had many fragment wounds on the front of his right shoulder and upper chest; two major fragments had gone straight through his chest. He had a lacerated lung and much internal bleeding. The autopsy also showed that he had been shot in the head at close range, most likely after he was already dead.

== Provisional IRA statement ==
On the radio news at 11.00 pm on 22 March 1989, the following statement was made:

In their statement the IRA says that after shooting the police officers dead they searched the vehicle in which the two RUC men were travelling from their security talks with the Gardaí in Dundalk and they found the confidential documents. They say the documents relate to cross-border collaboration with the security forces but they don't give any further specific details. The IRA say that the two top officers were shot dead after their car came to one of a number of checkpoints which the IRA claims they were operating on the Monday. They also say that the policemen acted suspiciously and attempted to drive off. Then, according to the IRA statement, the IRA volunteers feared their own lives could be in danger and they took what they called 'preventative action' to prevent the RUC men's escape.

Judge Cory made the following comment regarding the IRA statement: "The claim of self-defence, although imaginative, seems to have very little to do with either reality or veracity."

== Alleged Garda collusion ==
The ambush outside Jonesborough had been carefully planned and successfully executed. Since the killings there have been allegations of collusion between the Garda Síochána and the Provisional IRA. Journalist Toby Harnden suggested that the IRA had been tipped off about the return route that Breen and Buchanan had planned to take by a rogue Garda known as "Garda X". Buchanan had raised with Gardaí in Monaghan in 1987 that the RUC were concerned about the same Garda officer was 'unduly associating with the IRA' and hours before he left Armagh police station to meet Buchanan at Newry station, Breen had confided to Staff Officer Sergeant Alan Mains that he had a sense of foreboding about his trip to Dundalk because he believed the same Garda was in the pay of a senior IRA man living on the Armagh/Louth border and would pass on information to him.

Despite Breen's misgivings, at 1:50 pm the two officers left Newry for Dundalk and their 2:00 pm meeting with the Gardaí. In the 11 weeks before the killings, Buchanan had attended a total of 24 cross-border conferences with the Gardaí at the Dundalk, Carrickmacross and Monaghan Garda stations. He had driven his red Vauxhall Cavalier to all of the meetings without making any attempt to disguise it by changing its number plate with one from the stock of them he had been given for that purpose. He reportedly had never been worried about his safety whilst driving unarmed through the staunchly republican, IRA-dominated south Armagh countryside as he believed that "God would protect him". Breen had only recently attended one meeting in the Republic, on 2 February 1989 with Buchanan. For Breen, a visit to the Republic was a relatively rare event.

In March 2000, several months after the publication of Harnden's Bandit Country book, journalist Kevin Myers wrote in the Irish Times about the allegations of collusion between a Garda mole and the IRA, stating that they had led to the deaths of Breen and Buchanan. David Trimble MP for Upper Bann, MLA (and future First Minister of Northern Ireland) then wrote a letter to the Taoiseach Bertie Ahern TD on 25 March 2000, calling for an inquiry into the allegations of collusion. Jeffrey Donaldson, MP for Lagan Valley, used his parliamentary privilege in the House of Commons on 13 April 2000 to suggest that the named Garda detective sergeant passed on information to the IRA about the meeting in Dundalk which facilitated their ambush of the RUC officers. He also requested a Tribunal of Inquiry into the allegations.

In his investigation, Judge Cory opined that the Dundalk Garda station was most likely under IRA surveillance during the conference as a Garda had seen a blue or grey-coloured Cavalier driving slowly through the station's car park whilst the meeting was ongoing, and the driver seemed to have been "looking around". At 2.30 pm, another car—a red Ford Capri with Northern Ireland registration plates—slowly drove past the station three times. Superintendent Buchanan normally parked his car in front of the station. Unknown to either Breen or Buchanan, the latter's Cavalier had already been identified by the IRA as an "RUC vehicle" and they had tailed the car on one of Buchanan's earlier visits to Dundalk. The two policemen were also unaware that a British Army surveillance team had watched and noted IRA "dickers" following Buchanan's car but had failed to warn RUC Special Branch of this. Prompt notification by the British Army or MI5 would have precluded Breen and Buchanan from crossing the border on 20 March 1989 in a targeted car. Shortly before coming upon the scene of the killings, a civilian witness had observed British Army helicopters patrolling over the area. At 11:00 am on the morning of the killings, the Edenappa Road had been declared "out of bounds" by the security forces, yet this information was not relayed to the officers before they set out on their journey across the Irish border. There had been unusually high levels of IRA radio traffic recorded in South Armagh that day.

=== Smithwick Tribunal ===
Judge Cory's investigation prompted the Irish Government to set up the Smithwick Tribunal, a judicial inquiry into the events surrounding the killings. The investigations by Judge Peter Smithwick were completed by July 2006 and the public hearings in Dublin began on 7 June 2011. They were originally scheduled to be concluded in November 2011, but a six-months extension was granted by the government. In May 2012 the judge requested and was given more time. On 16 October 2012 the tribunal received a third extension with the conclusion date set for 31 July 2013. At the tribunal, Breen's family was represented by solicitor John McBurney and solicitor Ernie Waterworth represented the Buchanan family.

Before the public hearings began, members of the Smithwick Tribunal's legal team met with three former senior IRA volunteers, one of whom had a command role in the operation to kill the two officers.

The Tribunal heard from retired Garda Chief Superintendent Tom Curran, who was based in Monaghan at the time of the killings. He stated that in 1988 an informer told him of an IRA death threat against Buchanan. The man had allegedly said: "There's a fella crossing the border there to see you and he is going to be shot." Curran—who had met Buchanan many times and regarded him as a friend—was worried and duly informed Eugene Crowley, the assistant commissioner of crime and security at Garda headquarters in Dublin, about the threat. Curran never told Buchanan about the threat as he didn't want Buchanan to think that the Garda Síochána was trying to stop him coming to the Republic. In 1987, Buchanan had called to Curran's office to discuss RUC concerns about the Garda detective sergeant at Dundalk station who was "unnecessarily associating" with the IRA. Buchanan asked Curran to convey his message to Garda headquarters, which he did in person. Assistant Commissioner Crowley (now deceased) did not, however, seem interested in what Curran had to say about the possible collusion. This detective sergeant was the same man whom Breen had discussed with Sgt Alan Mains before setting out for Dundalk. This man was also on first name terms with the then RUC Chief Constable Sir John Hermon. Breen's widow June maintained that many times before the ambush, Breen had given her instructions that in the event of his death Hermon was not to be allowed to attend his funeral.

Ian Hurst, a former member of the Force Research Unit (FRU), sent a written statement to the Tribunal. In the document, Hurst alleged that up to 25 IRA operatives had been involved in the ambush, both directly and indirectly, According to Hurst, about one quarter of them were British agents, and that British agent and IRA intelligence officer Stakeknife had been aware of the plot as he was responsible for gathering the information that had led to the ambush. Hurst's evidence led the chairman of the Ulster Unionist Party North Down Association (and former RUC officer) Colin Breen to suggest that, had the information been passed on by the British Intelligence Corps to the RUC or Garda Síochána, the double killing could have been prevented. Agent Kevin Fulton, who spied on the IRA for the Intelligence Corps, alleged that his senior IRA commander was told by another IRA volunteer that on the day of the killings, the South Armagh IRA was informed by one of the Gardaí (known as "Garda B") that the two RUC officers were inside Dundalk Garda station. Fulton had been in Dundalk that same day.

Retired Garda Detective Sergeant Sean Gethins told the Tribunal that the IRA team at Jonesborough had initially planned to kidnap and interrogate Breen. He was to be questioned about internal security leaks that led to the May 1987 Loughgall Ambush of an IRA active service unit (ASU) by the Special Air Service which had resulted in the deaths of eight IRA volunteers and a civilian. According to Gethins, Breen was targeted by the IRA after he had given television interviews in the days following the ambush. Kevin Fulton suggested British agents who took part in the ambush at Jonesborough had shot Breen and Buchanan lest they reveal the names of informants whilst under torture. Ian Hurst, in his statement confirmed that the IRA's original plan had been to kidnap the two RUC officers and interrogate them at a secure location in the Republic. Once the IRA unit had extracted all possible information from the two men, they would have killed them. Hurst claimed to have received the information from agent Stakeknife's long-term handler. He also added that sanction for the ambush and killing of such high-ranking RUC officers as Breen and Buchanan would have come from the highest echelons of the IRA's Northern Command.

A former RUC assistant chief constable told the Tribunal that Breen and Buchanan had been warned against going to Dundalk at a meeting on 16 March 1989, but that they had disobeyed orders. Breen's widow, however, denied that her late husband had attended the meeting as he had spent that day with her, and Breen's diary recorded that on 16 March he was on leave. The security conference with Gardaí in Dundalk had been set up after a dinner at Stormont House on 6 March, which had been attended by both Breen and Buchanan. It was there that Secretary of State for Northern Ireland Tom King had suggested the meeting after receiving reports from a British Army colonel about the cross-border smuggling activities of a well-known IRA man whose property straddled the Armagh/Louth border. According to Sgt Alan Mains, Breen was "specifically directed to speak with the Guards [Gardai] and the Army, and to come up with some kind of reply for the Chief Constable and the Secretary of State". Breen allegedly had much information about the smuggler. A former RUC Special Branch chief, however stated to the Tribunal that both Breen and Buchanan had been opposed to carrying out "Operation Amazing" against the smuggler as there was not enough substantial information on which to base it. When it was suggested to Tom King that the proposed operation was "ill-advised and dangerous", he reportedly struck the table and insisted that it was to go ahead.

Harnden declined to testify before the tribunal, later stating: "I was confident that me appearing would not have added anything substantive to the tribunal. There were some quite serious issues of protecting confidential sources and I just ultimately felt that the book should speak for itself."

The tribunal's report was published on 3 December 2013. In its report Judge Peter Smithwick stated he was "satisfied there was collusion in the murders". Harnden stated: "The Smithwick Tribunal and its conclusions wouldn't have happened if it hadn't been for Bandit Country. It is the only time in my career that my work has had that national and international impact."

==== Allegation ====
In November 2011, a retired RUC Special Branch detective inspector (known as "Witness 62") based at Gough Barracks, gave evidence at the Tribunal in which he named Sean Hughes from Dromintee, County Armagh, as the leader of the Provisional IRA ambush unit and a former member of the IRA Army Council. Nicknamed "The Surgeon", Hughes was described as having been one of the hardliners inside the republican movement. He was said to be in charge of the North Louth/Dromintee unit that carried out the ambush with assistance from members of the Crossmaglen group. The experienced North Louth/Dromintee unit has been implicated in up to 80 attacks including a car bombing on the main Dublin to Belfast road at Killeen, Newry on 23 July 1988. Civilians Robert and Maureen Hanna, along with their seven-year-old son, David, were killed when the IRA team detonated a 1,000-pound landmine as their jeep drove past, having mistaken their vehicle for that of Judge Eoin Higgins. Harry Breen appeared on television to comment on the RUC investigation into the killing of the Hanna family. The IRA was reportedly deeply divided over the Hanna family bombing, with many violent altercations breaking out in Armagh pubs as a result. The alleged unit leader, Thomas "Slab" Murphy, has never been convicted in a criminal trial of IRA membership nor any paramilitary-related offences, although he has been convicted of smuggling and tax evasion.

"Witness 62" added that on the day of the Jonesborough ambush, the IRA had placed a "spotter" on the road from Dundalk to observe which direction Breen and Buchanan would take to return north. Having noted the road the RUC officers had taken, the spotter immediately alerted the ambush team that Buchanan was driving up the Edenappa Road. He concluded that "without a shadow of a doubt it [the ambush] was pre-planned".

=== Down Orange Welfare ===
Former RUC Special Patrol Group (SPG) officer John Weir stated in his affidavit that he was given submachine guns for the UVF Mid-Ulster Brigade by a group of County Down loyalists called Down Orange Welfare (DOW), a vigilante outfit who were engaged in manufacturing weapons. This group was made up of former and serving members of the security forces. Weir alleged that Officer Breen belonged to this organisation. Weir's information from his affidavit was published in 2003 in the Barron Report which was the findings of an official investigation commissioned by Irish Supreme Court justice Henry Barron into the Ulster Volunteer Force's 1974 Dublin and Monaghan bombings. At the time Weir allegedly met Breen at a DOW meeting, Breen was a chief inspector in Newry.

The UVF Mid-Ulster Brigade was commanded by Robin "The Jackal" Jackson from 1975 to the early 1990s. Over 50 killings have been attributed to Jackson, according to David McKittrick in his book Lost Lives, and he was allegedly an RUC Special Branch agent. Weir also claimed that Breen was fully aware of collusion between certain RUC officers and loyalist paramilitaries such as Jackson. Furthermore, he claimed to have overheard a conversation between Breen and another inspector in which they were discussing with approval the association of two named RUC officers with Jackson. When Weir later told Breen of his own involvement in the sectarian killing of Catholic chemist William Strathearn (for which he was convicted), Breen reportedly had advised him to "forget about it". Weir's allegations are strongly denied by Breen's former RUC colleagues. Former officer Andrew Hanna stated in an interview, "it's untrue that he colluded with loyalists". The Inquiry led by Mr Justice Barron believed Weir's evidence overall to have been credible; however, the Inquiry did express reservations about Weir's "allegations against police officers having regard to his possible motive in going public, and also in relation to his own part in the offences which he relates". Weir was a prominent member of the Glenanne gang, a loose alliance of loyalist extremists which included the UVF Mid-Ulster Brigade and rogue elements of the security forces. The Pat Finucane Centre (a Derry-based civil rights group) has linked this gang to at least 87 killings in the Mid-Ulster area in the 1970s.

=== Doubts regarding Garda collusion ===
Investigative journalist Paul Larkin, in his book A Very British Jihad: collusion, conspiracy and cover-up in Northern Ireland, claimed that Breen was a leading officer in the SPG. He dismissed claims of collusion between the Gardaí and IRA, pointing out that, because South Armagh (known as "Bandit Country") was controlled by the IRA and was a "no-go area" for the security forces, the IRA would not have needed Garda help to carry out the ambush. Judge Peter Cory stated in his report that the Provisional IRA had developed sophisticated intelligence-gathering techniques which enabled them to monitor the telephone calls and radio transmissions of the RUC and British Army. Less than two years before the Jonesborough ambush, the IRA detonated a remote-controlled car bomb which killed Lord Justice of Appeal Sir Maurice Gibson and his wife, Cecily, Lady Gibson as they were returning home from a holiday. The couple was blown up shortly after their car crossed the Northern Ireland border on the main Dublin-Belfast road. They had just left their Garda escort and were approaching the rendezvous point with their RUC escort when the explosion occurred. Collusion was also suspected in the killings but the investigation into the bombing by Judge Cory revealed that the IRA had most likely carried out the attack without any assistance from outside agencies. Superintendent Buchanan had played a large part in the investigation into the bombing.

Ian Lisles, a retired British Army brigadier who served 14 years in Northern Ireland—much of it in South Armagh—suggested to the Tribunal that the IRA could not have mounted the operation in less than three hours; it most likely had required between five and eight hours of advance preparation. He maintained that the IRA was too professional an organisation to have attempted an ad hoc ambush on such short notice as would have been the case had the attack been carried out upon being alerted by a Garda mole as to the presence of the two senior RUC officers at the Dundalk station.

== See also ==
- Chronology of Provisional Irish Republican Army actions (1980–89)
