= Iain Livingstone =

Scottish solicitor and former police officer (born 1966)

Sir Iain Livingstone QPM
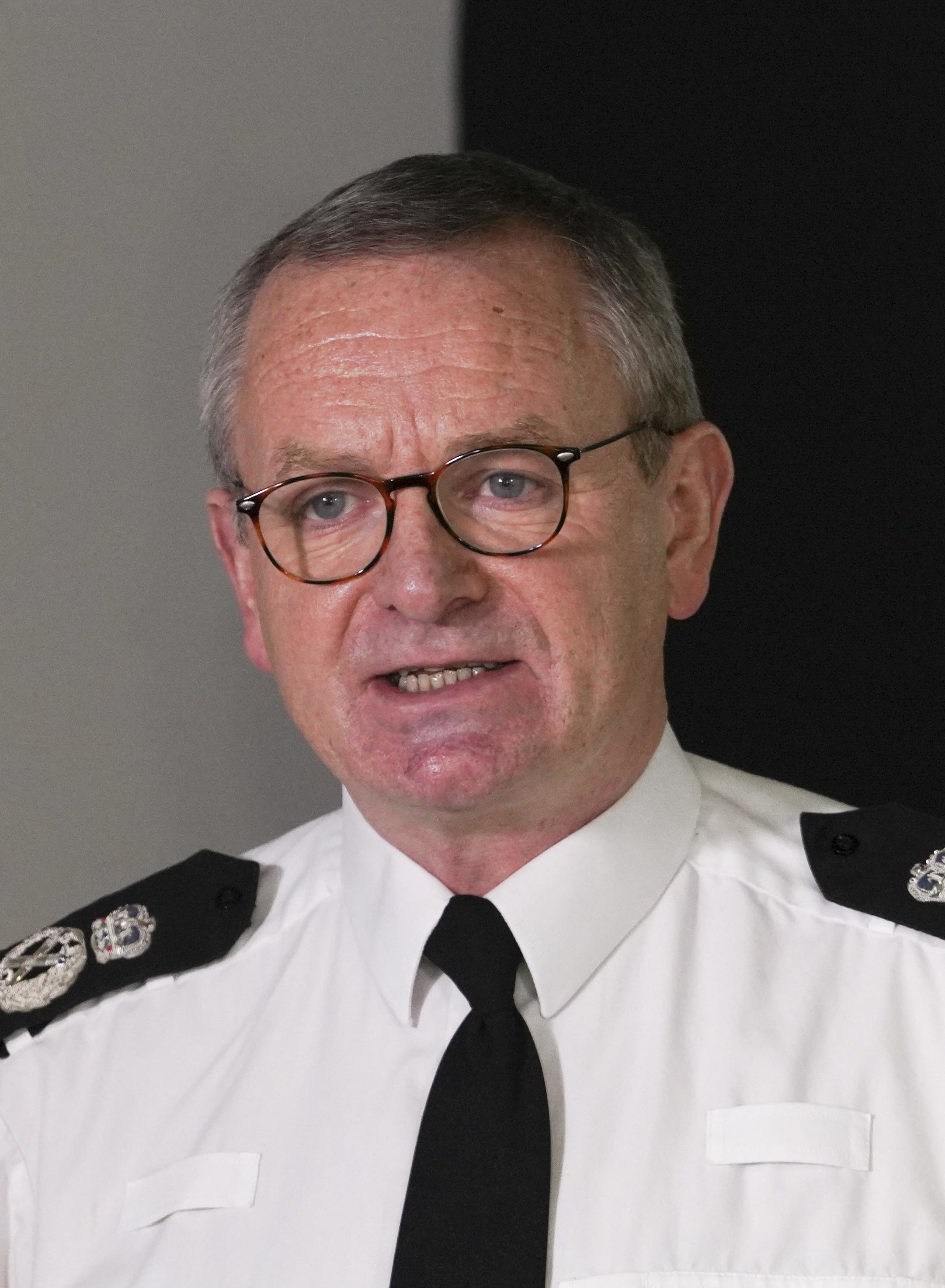

Chief Constable of Police Scotland
- In office 27 August 2018 – 10 August 2023
- Preceded by: Phil Gormley
- Succeeded by: Jo Farrell

Deputy Chief Constable Designate of Police Scotland
- In office May 2016 – 27 August 2018
- Preceded by: Neil Richardson

Personal details
- Born: Iain Thomas Livingstone; 6 October 1966 (age 60) Dunfermline, Fife, Scotland
- Education: University of Aberdeen; University of Strathclyde; John Jay College of Criminal Justice
- Profession: Solicitor, police officer
Association football career
- Position: Right winger
Youth career
- Raith Colts
Senior career*
Years	Team	Apps	(Gls)
1983–1985	Raith Rovers	2	(0)
1985–1986	Montrose	1	(0)
- * Club domestic league appearances and goals

Sir Iain Thomas Livingstone, QPM (born 6 October 1966) is a Scottish solicitor and retired police officer who served as Chief Constable of Police Scotland. He is currently leading Operation Kenova, a series of historical investigations and reviews in relation to murders and other criminal activity which took place during The Troubles in Northern Ireland.

He took over as Officer in Overall Command of Kenova in 2023 after his predecessor, Jon Boutcher QPM, took on the Chief Constable role of the PSNI.

Prior to becoming Chief Constable of Police Scotland, Sir Iain had served as Deputy Chief Constable Designate. He was named as the next Chief Constable on 15 August 2018 and took up office formally on 27 August 2018. He retired from Police Scotland in August 2023.

== Early life ==
Livingstone graduated from the University of Aberdeen in 1988 with a first class Bachelor of Laws degree. During his time as a student at Aberdeen he played association football as a forward for Raith Rovers and Montrose. He also attended the University of Strathclyde before beginning a career as a solicitor.

== Police career ==
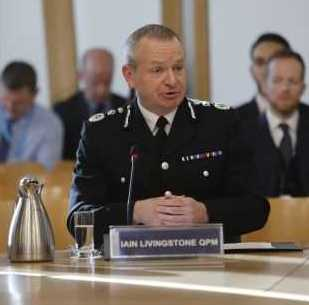
Chief Constable Livingstone addressing the Scottish Parliament in 2020

Livingstone joined Lothian and Borders Police in 1992, rising swiftly through the ranks and eventually becoming head of that force's CID branch and Assistant Chief Constable for Crime. He graduated with a master's degree from the John Jay College of Criminal Justice at the City University of New York, where he studied from 1998 as a Fulbright scholar; he also served secondments as a special investigator with the Police Ombudsman for Northern Ireland, and was part of Lord Bonomy's review of corroboration. He has sat on the Scottish Sentencing Council. He advises on the Operation Kenova investigation into matters during The Troubles in Northern Ireland.

Livingstone served in detective and uniform roles in Edinburgh and West Lothian, leading a number of major investigations and operations. As Detective Superintendent, he played a key role in the security operation around the 31st G8 summit in 2005 and headed the murder investigation into the double shooting at the Marmion Bar in Edinburgh.

After completing the Strategic Command Course, he was appointed Assistant Chief Constable for Lothian and Borders Police in April 2009, with responsibility for Crime and Operations. As ACC, he was Gold commander for many significant events including the visit to Edinburgh of Pope Benedict XVI in 2010.

When Lothian & Borders was amalgamated into the new Police Scotland force in 2013, Livingstone was named Deputy Chief Constable for Crime and operations. After being overlooked for the Chief Constable job when Phil Gormley was appointed as the successor to Stephen House in late 2015, he initially remained part of the force executive but in summer 2017 announced his intention to retire in the coming months. He then accepted a request to reconsider his decision after several allegations of misconduct were made against Chief Constable Gormley and the latter was placed on special leave; by September 2017 Livingstone was leading the force on an interim basis. When Gormley resigned in February 2018 to contest the allegations, Livingstone became the frontrunner to succeed him formally. The role as Chief Constable from 27 August 2018 carries a four-year term and an annual salary of £216,000.

As Chief Constable, he led the national service during through the COVID-19 pandemic, the security operation for the 2021 United Nations Climate Change Conference and Operation Unicorn following the death of Queen Elizabeth.

He retired from Police Scotland on 10 August 2023.

In November 2023 Livingstone took on the role of Officer in Overall Command of Operation Kenova, a series of historical investigations and reviews in relation to the Troubles in Northern Ireland after his predecessor, Jon Boutcher was made Chief Constable of the PSNI.

In August 2024, following the publication of the Operation Kenova interim report, Livingstone wrote to Secretary of State for Northern Ireland, Hilary Benn, to raise concerns after previously undisclosed material was made available by MI5.

== Sexual misconduct allegations ==
Livingstone was suspended and demoted in 2003 after an allegation of sexual misconduct after an event at Tulliallan Policing College three years earlier, but was cleared following an internal misconduct hearing and later reinstated to his previous role as Superintendent (the youngest officer of that rank in Scotland at the time) following an appeal.

Livingstone acknowledged he had acted inappropriately by falling asleep in the woman's room, although he was cleared of any sexual misconduct. He told the BBC earlier that he had too much to drink at a social event at the college, and had fallen asleep "in the wrong place", adding: "That was wrong, I shouldn't have done that".

== Honours ==
Livingstone was awarded the Queen's Police Medal in 2015 for distinguished service. He was knighted in the 2022 Birthday Honours for services to policing and the public.

Ribbon	Description	Notes
	Knight Bachelor	2022 Queen's Birthday Honours List
	Queen's Police Medal (QPM)	2015 Queen's Birthday Honours List
	Queen Elizabeth II Golden Jubilee Medal	2002; UK version of this medal
	Queen Elizabeth II Diamond Jubilee Medal	2012; UK version of this medal
	Queen Elizabeth II Platinum Jubilee Medal	2022; UK version of this medal
	King Charles III Coronation Medal	2023; UK version of this medal
	Police Long Service and Good Conduct Medal	

Police appointments
Preceded by Phil Gormley	Chief Constable of Police Scotland; 2018–2023	Succeeded by Jo Farrell
