= Phil Gormley =

Scottish police officer

Phil Gormley QPM
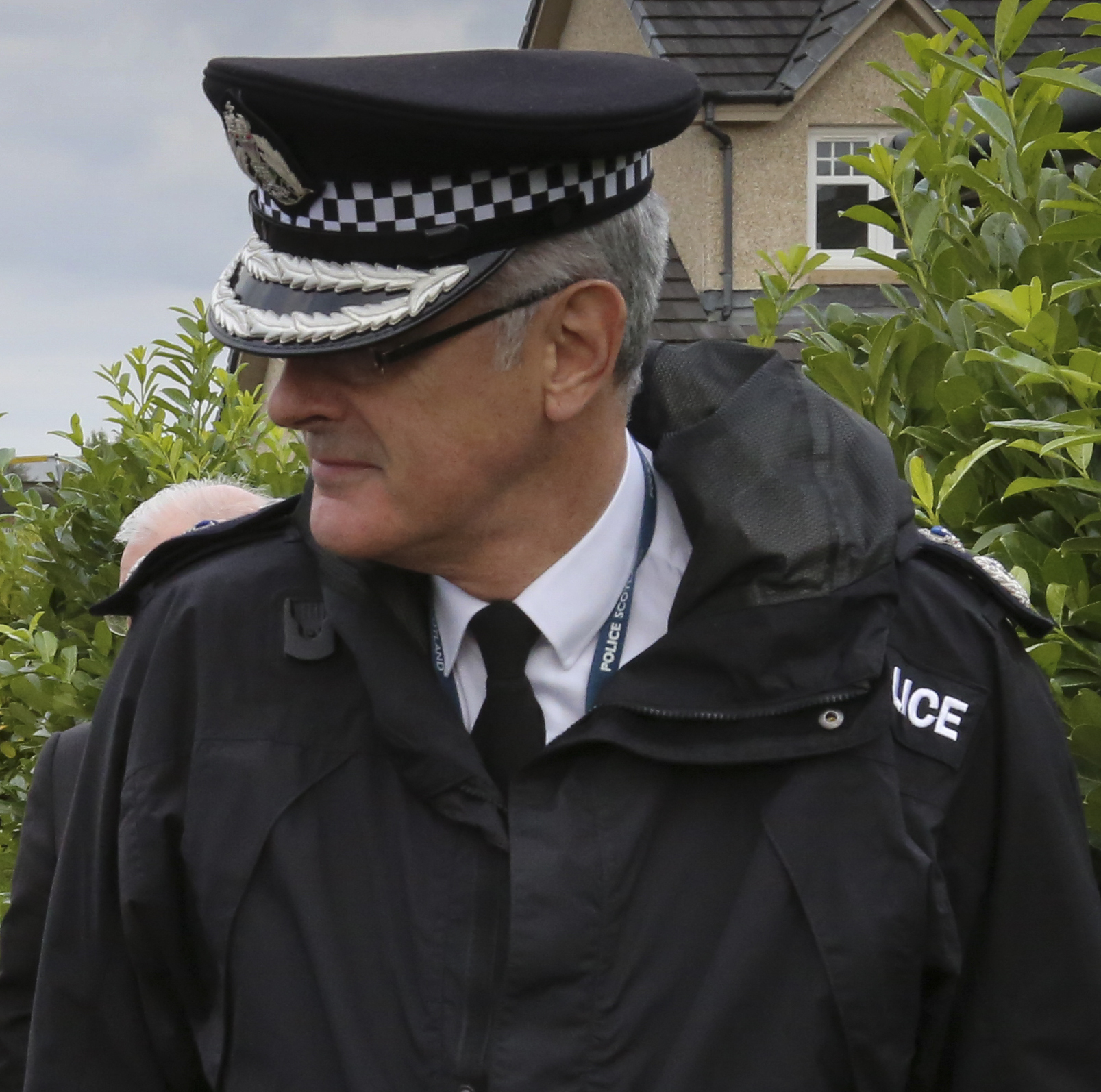
- Chief Constable Gormley in 2016

Her Majesty's Inspectorate of Constabulary and Fire & Rescue Services
- Incumbent
- Assumed office 22 October 2018
- Preceded by: Mike Cunningham

Chief Constable of Police Scotland
- In office 5 January 2016 – 7 February 2018
- Preceded by: Sir Stephen House
- Succeeded by: Iain Livingstone

Deputy Director-General of the National Crime Agency
- In office May 2013 – October 2015
- Director-General: Keith Bristow
- Preceded by: Office created
- Succeeded by: David Armond

Chief Constable of Norfolk Constabulary
- In office March 2010 – May 2013
- Preceded by: Ian McPherson
- Succeeded by: Simon Bailey

Personal details
- Born: Philip Gormley; 8 March 1963 (age 63) Surrey, England
- Citizenship: United Kingdom
- Education: University of Gloucestershire; University of Cambridge
- Awards: Queen's Police Medal (2012)

Philip Michael Christopher Gormley, QPM (born 8 March 1963) is a British former senior police officer. He is the current CEO for EACH (East Anglia Children's Hospices) based in Norfolk, England.

== Early life ==
Gormley was born on 8 March 1963 in Redhill, Surrey, England. He was educated at John Fisher Grammar School, an all-boys Catholic school in Purley, London. He studied English and history at the University of Gloucestershire, graduating with a Bachelor of Arts (BA) degree in 1984. He later undertook postgraduate study at the University of Cambridge, completing a postgraduate diploma.

== Police career ==
In 1985, Gormley began his policing career as a constable with Thames Valley Police. In 1999, he was promoted to superintendent and appointed commander with responsibility for the Southern Oxfordshire area. In 2003, he joined the Metropolitan Police and was appointed Commander of Specialist Operations. In 2005, he organised the merger of the Anti-Terrorist Branch and Special Branch into what would become the Counter Terrorism Command in 2006.

From 2007 to 2010, Gormley was Deputy Chief Constable of West Midlands Police. From 22 March 2010 to 2013, he was Chief Constable of Norfolk Constabulary. He was the second highest paid Chief Constable in the United Kingdom with a salary of £260,000. In May 2013, he was appointed Deputy Director General of the newly created National Crime Agency (NCA). As of 2015, Gormley was paid a salary of £185,000 by the NCA, making him one of the 328 most highly paid people in the British public sector at that time. In March 2015, it was announced that he would be leaving the NCA in the Autumn of 2015. He stepped down in October 2015.

On 2 December 2015, it was announced that Gormley would be the next Chief Constable of Police Scotland. He was only the second CC of the force after the Scottish police forces merged in 2013. He beat two of the Deputy Chief Constables for Police Scotland to the job; Neil Richardson, the Designated Deputy for Chief Constable, and Iain Livingstone, the Deputy Chief Constable (crime and operational support). He took up the appointment on 5 January 2016, with a salary of £212,280.

On 26 July 2017, Gormley announced that he was the subject of, and cooperating with, a misconduct investigation by the Police Investigations and Review Commissioner (PIRC), following a referral by the Scottish Police Authority (SPA). On 7 February 2018, he resigned from his Police Scotland post with immediate effect, being replaced on a temporary basis by his deputy Iain Livingstone, who had already been leading the organisation in Gormley's absence for some months.

== Later career ==
In October 2018, Gormley was appointed HM Inspector of Constabulary and HM Inspector of Fire & Rescue Services for the Northern Region. After two years he stepped down, and he has been chief executive of East Anglia's Children's Hospices since 2020.

== Honours ==
In the 2013 New Year Honours, Gormley was awarded the Queen's Police Medal (QPM) in recognition of his service as Chief Constable of Norfolk Police.

Ribbon	Description	Notes
	Queen's Police Medal (QPM)	January 2013
	Queen Elizabeth II Golden Jubilee Medal	2002; UK Version of this Medal
	Queen Elizabeth II Diamond Jubilee Medal	2012; UK Version of this Medal
	Police Long Service and Good Conduct Medal	

== Charitable Work ==
As of 2020, Gormley has undertaken the role of Chief Executive of EACH (East Anglia's Children's Hospices). He led the charity through financial struggle during the 2020 COVID-19 pandemic, which resulted in temporary charity shop closure and cancellation of fundraising events.

== Personal life ==
Gormley has resided in Norfolk, England since 2010.

Police appointments
Preceded by Ian McPherson	Chief Constable of Norfolk Constabulary; 2010–2013	Succeeded by Simon Bailey
New title	Deputy Director of the National Crime Agency; 2013–2015	Succeeded by David Armond
Preceded by Sir Stephen House	Chief Constable of Police Scotland; 2016–2018	Succeeded by Iain Livingstone
