= Murders of Catherine and Gerard Mahon =

1985 murder case in Northern Ireland

- Part of The Troubles
- Date: 8 September 1985; 40 years ago
- Location: Turf Lodge, Belfast, Northern Ireland; 54.5876°N 5.9894°W
- Motive: Suspected informers
- Perpetrator: Provisional IRA Internal Security Unit
- Deaths: Gerard Mahon; Catherine Mahon
- Location: Murders of Catherine and Gerard Mahon (Greater Belfast) Murders of Catherine and Gerard Mahon (Northern Ireland)

Catherine and Gerard Mahon were a husband and wife who lived in the Twinbrook suburb of Belfast. Gerard, aged twenty-eight, was a mechanic; Catherine, was twenty-seven. They were killed by the Provisional Irish Republican Army (Provisional IRA) on 8 September 1985, the Provisional IRA alleging they were informers. However at least two of those responsible for their deaths were later uncovered as British agents within the Provisional IRA's Internal Security Unit, leaving the actual status of the Mahons as informers open to doubt.

== Background ==
The Mahons were neighbours of estate agent Joseph Fenton, a supplier of 'safe houses' for the IRA, but also an informer for RUC Special Branch. When a number of Provisional IRA missions were compromised, Fenton is believed to have directed a member of the Internal Security Unit, Freddie Scappaticci, and three other men, to the Mahons. Abducted in August, interrogated and beaten for prolonged periods, the Mahons eventually confessed that their flat was bugged by the Royal Ulster Constabulary (RUC), who are alleged to have paid the couple for information, another version is that the Mahons had agreed to inform on the Provisional IRA if the RUC overlooked a number of outstanding fines and charges they were facing. One of the weapons hidden with the Mahons as a safe house was found by the Provisional IRA to have been fitted with a surveillance device.

== Deaths ==
The Provisional IRA took the couple from the location they were being held at on the Monagh Road to an alleyway on Norglen Crescent in Turf Lodge and shot them. It is thought Catherine Mahon was shot in the back while trying to escape. Gerard was shot in the face and then the back of the head while his wife was forced to watch. She then tried to run away and was cut down by a burst of machine gun fire. Following the killings, the three gunmen returned to their taxi and were driven away.

Those who found their bodies said at the time:

"We heard two bursts of gunfire and then a car was driven away at high speed. We went out and discovered the girl. We thought she was dead. We tried first aid but the side of her head was blown away. A young lad came up to us saying there was a man lying in the entry a bit further up and still alive. We got to him and he was badly wounded. He was struggling to breathe and choking on his own blood. He had been hit in the side of the head and the face. Whatever is behind it all, it's ridiculous. Those responsible are animals. Nothing justifies murder. They had both been tied by their wrists – but they must have broken free by struggling when they realised what was going to happen."

Joe Hendron of the Social Democratic and Labour Party released a statement, remarking:

"This slaughter has few equals in barbarity and it proves the Provo idea of justice is warped. It makes us all sick."

== Aftermath ==
On 24 July 1991, Paul Pius Duffy was arrested and held in Castlereagh holding centre in relation to the murders. After a number of interviews, he had confessed to transporting the Mahons to Turf Lodge for the Provisional IRA in his taxi. He also claimed to have been a member of the Provisional IRA previously, having transported rifles and explosives for them, but had been stood down after being suspected of being a 'tout', and had left the organisation in November 1985.

In May 1993, Duffy was convicted for multiple counts of manslaughter, false imprisonment, being a member of a proscribed organisation, conspiracy to murder members of the security forces, and a number of charges relating to possession of explosives and firearms with intent to endanger life. All sentences were to run concurrently, resulting in a 10-year sentence.

In February 2024, Duffy launched an appeal to overturn his conviction, claiming that the confession had been coerced by the RUC. In April 2024, his appeal was rejected by the Northern Ireland Court of Appeal.

== See also ==
- Freddie Scappaticci
- Eamon Collins
- Murder of Thomas Oliver
- Murder of Jean McConville
- Peter Wilson (Disappeared)
- Thomas Niedermayer
- Joseph Fenton
