= Simon Bailey (police officer) =

British police officer

Chief Constable Simon Robert Bailey CBE QPM DL
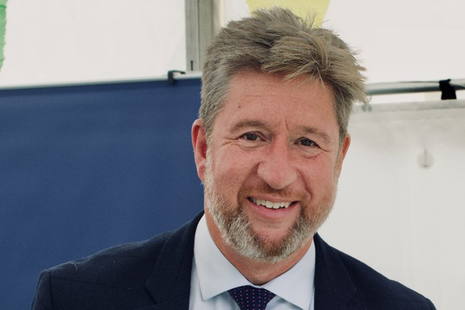
- Born: 1965 (age 60–61)
- Occupation: police officer
- Known for: awarded the Queen's Police Medal

Simon Robert Bailey CBE QPM DL (born March 1965) is a British senior police officer. Between 2013 and 2021, he was the Chief Constable of the Norfolk Constabulary. Bailey is also the National Police Chiefs' Council lead on child protection. He previously worked as a detective, and was involved in the investigation of the murder of Rosemary Nelson.

In 2015, he led Operation Hydrant, an umbrella investigation into multiple allegations of historic sexual abuse throughout the United Kingdom.

Bailey was awarded the Queen's Police Medal (QPM) in the 2016 New Year Honours. He was appointed Commander of the Order of the British Empire (CBE) in the 2022 Birthday Honours for services to policing and child protection.

== Views ==
Bailey is concerned about the impact of austerity on Norfolk Constabulary, stating: "It would mean a reduction of 110 officers; it would take my numbers to a historic low of 1,400. Community policing will be under threat. We will end up attending and investigating less, detecting less crime, and providing a service I don't believe any chief constable would be happy with."

== Honours ==

Ribbon	Description	Notes
	Order of the British Empire (CBE)	2022 Queen's Birthday Honours List; Commander; Civil Division
	Queen's Police Medal (QPM)	2016
	Queen Elizabeth II Golden Jubilee Medal	2002; UK version of this medal
	Queen Elizabeth II Diamond Jubilee Medal	2012; UK version of this medal
	Queen Elizabeth II Platinum Jubilee Medal	2022; UK version of this medal
	Police Long Service and Good Conduct Medal	

Police appointments
Preceded by Phil Gormley	Chief Constable of Norfolk Constabulary; 2013–2021	Incumbent
