= Mary McArdle =

Irish republican

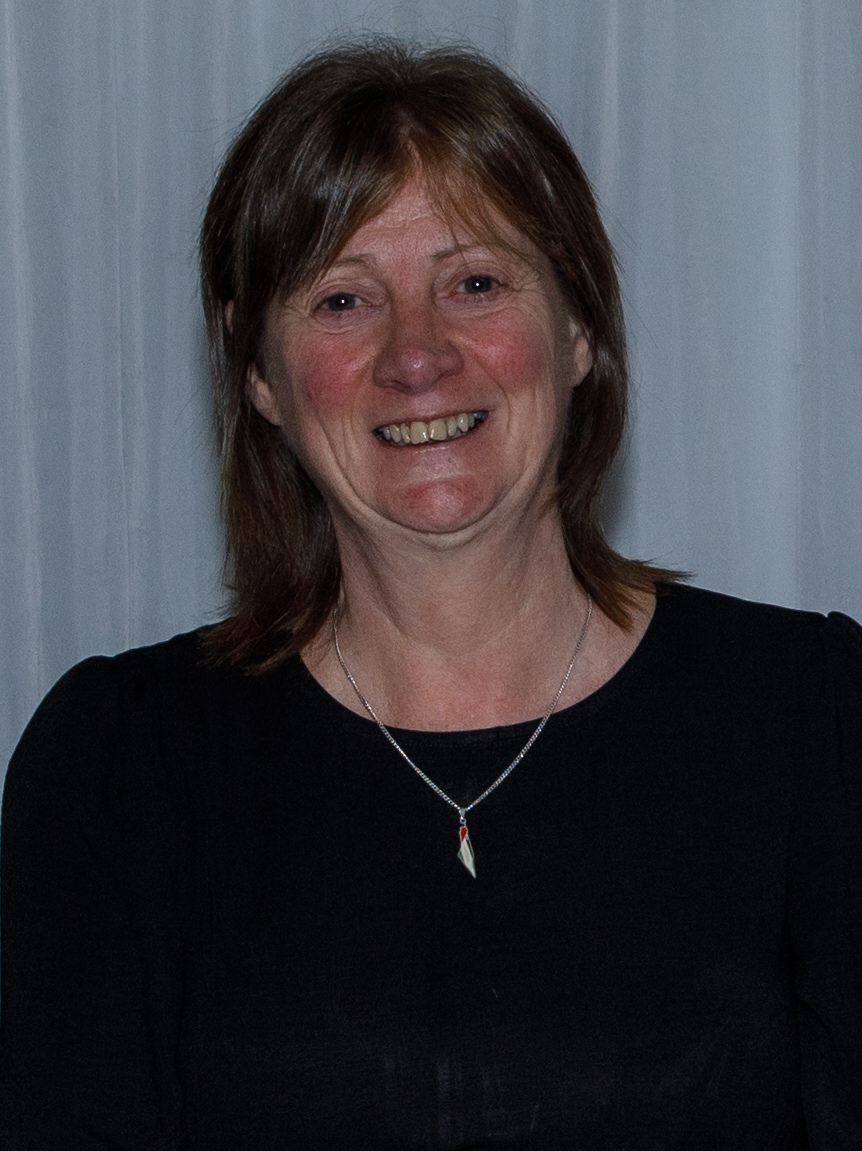
- McArdle in 2026
- Occupation: Political adviser
- Political party: Sinn Féin
- Movement: Irish republicanism
- Criminal charges: Murder, attempted murder
- Criminal penalty: Life sentence (murder); 18-year concurrent sentence (attempted murder)
- Criminal status: Released (1998, under terms of the Belfast Agreement)

Mary McArdle is an Irish republican and former Provisional Irish Republican Army (IRA) member.

McArdle was the Ministerial Special Adviser to Sinn Féin Culture Minister Carál Ní Chuilín and previously an IRA member, convicted of murder in 1984. Her appointment to the position was controversial because of her conviction for the murder of Mary Travers.

== Murder of Mary Travers ==
Two male members of the IRA approached Resident Magistrate Tom Travers, his wife, and daughter, Mary, as they left Mass. Travers was shot six times and his daughter shot once through the back. One gunman brought his gun to point-blank range at Mrs. Travers' face and fired twice, but the gun jammed. According to the Belfast Telegraph:

"After the attack the IRA claimed the judge had been a legitimate target because of his role in the British judicial system. They also tried to claim that the bullet which killed the young schoolteacher had passed through her father's body first but a post mortem found she was shot directly in the spine."

McArdle, then aged 19, was arrested shortly after the attack and charged "after two hand guns, a grey wig and a black sock concealed in bandages were found strapped to her thighs." Two months later 33-year-old IRA member Joseph Patrick Haughey, was arrested and charged in connection with the attack. At the trial two years later, McArdle was found guilty and received "a life sentence for her role in the murder of Mary Travers and an 18-year concurrent sentence for the attempted murder of Mr Travers." Haughey was acquitted due to lack of forensic evidence and doubts over his identity, though Tom Travers positively identified him in a line-up.

McArdle served 14 years in prison before being released early under the terms of the Belfast Agreement.

== Special Adviser appointment ==
Following outrage at her appointment in 2011, McArdle expressed remorse for the murder of Travers, calling it "a tragic mistake".

McArdle's statement was rebutted by Mary Travers' sister, Ann, who stated:

"Mistake? Mistake? My sister was murdered. There were two gunmen, one standing over my dad shooting him and one who shot my sister in the back and attempted to murder my mother but the bullets jammed in the gun. The fact that she [McArdle] calls my sister's murder a mistake, well, that day two gunmen went with two guns, so if they were just planning to kill my dad, why did they go out with two guns. They knew my dad wasn't armed. After 27 years I'd have thought I'd be able to speak about my sister's murder factually and without grief but when I heard of Mary McArdle's appointment last Thursday it did something to me which I just have not been able to contain the grief it brought back. Rather than Mary McArdle and Sinn Féin saying her death was a mistake, what they should be saying is Mary Travers' murder is an embarrassment which has come back to haunt them."

== Aftermath ==
In March 2012, Sinn Féin stated that McArdle had been moved from the post of special adviser to the Culture Minister to another post in the Party. She was replaced by Jarlath Kearney, a former journalist, who had previously worked as a Sinn Féin policy adviser. A Sinn Féin spokesperson said it was part of normal party policy to rotate staff.

In 2026, as director of the Falls Road Women's Centre, McArdle was photographed alongside President Catherine Connolly. Mary Travers' sister, Ann, was critical of what she described as a "normalisation" of the violence experienced during the Troubles and called on President Connolly to encourage McArdle to meet with the Travers family and to cooperate with the Historical Enquiries Team. She claimed that McArdle knows who killed her sister and could help bring her justice.

== Sources ==
- http://sluggerotoole.com/2011/06/02/while-it-may-be-described-as-being-a-mistake-she-was-shot-in-the-back/
- http://sluggerotoole.com/2011/06/23/what-are-sinn-fein-waiting-for-more-people-to-die/
- http://sluggerotoole.com/2011/06/23/just-following-orders-sf-ministers-subordinate-within-their-own-command-structure/
- https://www.bbc.co.uk/news/uk-northern-ireland-13627500
- https://web.archive.org/web/20120322091922/http://saoirse32.blogsome.com/2011/06/03/p17164/
