= Smithwick Tribunal =

Irish tribunal

The Smithwick Tribunal was an Irish Tribunal of Inquiry into the events surrounding the killing of Chief Superintendent Harry Breen and Superintendent Robert Buchanan of the Royal Ulster Constabulary (RUC). The men were killed in a Provisional Irish Republican Army (IRA) ambush near the Irish border at Jonesborough on 20 March 1989 as they returned in an unmarked car from a cross-border security conference in Dundalk with senior Garda officers. The tribunal issued its report on 3 December 2013, finding there had been collusion between members of the Gardaí and the IRA, which resulted in the deaths of Breen and Buchanan. The tribunal took its name from the chairman of the Tribunal, Judge Peter Smithwick.

== Background ==
The setting up of the Smithwick tribunal was prompted by Peter Cory, a Canadian judge who was commissioned by the Irish government to investigate the killing of the two RUC officers and determine if there were grounds for a public inquiry into the case. In his report, published in October 2003, Judge Cory stated it could be said that the IRA did not need information from the Gardaí to carry out the ambush and that intelligence reports received in the aftermath had also pointed to this conclusion. However, Cory referred to two other intelligence reports mentioning a Garda leak and a statement from a British intelligence agent known as Kevin Fulton who claimed an IRA man told him that the IRA was told about the presence of the RUC officers in Dundalk police station by a Garda.

In July 2006, Judge Smithwick stated that he would complete his investigations before public hearings began. On 7 June 2011, public hearings began in Dublin.

== Tribunal remit ==
The tribunal examined whether there was a failure to act in preventing the deaths of the two officers. Smithwick stated that the inquiry would investigate potential collusion in the 'widest sense of the word.' He further clarified that while collusion typically refers to the commission of an act, it should also encompass omissions or failures to act. He explained: 'I intend to examine whether anyone turned a blind eye, feigned ignorance, or disregarded something they had a moral, legal, or official duty to oppose."

== Collusion allegations ==
There have been allegations that the IRA were tipped off about the route the men had planned to take by a member of the Garda Síochána, informally known as "Garda X". British Member of Parliament Jeffrey Donaldson used his parliamentary privilege in the House of Commons in 2000 to suggest that Garda Detective Sergeant Owen Corrigan passed on information to the IRA about the meeting. Corrigan's barrister denied the allegation at the tribunal: "That statement by Jeffrey Donaldson was a monstrous lie. It was false and my client wishes to establish the falsehood of it."

== The Tribunal ==
Before the public sessions opened, the tribunal's legal team met with three former senior IRA volunteers, one of whom had a command role in the ambush. Among the witnesses who gave testimony were former and serving Gardaí, informants, British agents, and former colleagues of the dead officers, including Breen's staff officer, Sergeant Alan Mains. The Breen and Buchanan families were represented by solicitors John McBurney and Ernie Waterworth, respectively.

== Findings of Garda collusion with the IRA ==
The tribunal's report was published on 3 December 2013.

In the report Judge Smithwick said that although there was no "smoking gun", he was "satisfied there was collusion in the murders" and that he was "satisfied that the evidence points to the fact that there was someone within the Garda station assisting the IRA". The report was also critical of two earlier Garda investigations into the murders, which it described as "inadequate". Irish Justice Minister Alan Shatter apologised "without reservation" for the failings identified in the report. Martin Callinan, Garda Commissioner, stated that the notion of Garda/IRA collusion was "horrifying", and Taoiseach Enda Kenny declared the report to be "shocking".
