= Joseph Fenton =

British spy (c. 1953 – 1989)

Joseph "Joe" Fenton (c. 1953 – 26 February 1989) was an estate agent from Belfast, Northern Ireland, killed by the Provisional Irish Republican Army (IRA) for acting as an informer for RUC Special Branch.

== Activity as an informer ==
In the early 1980s Fenton agreed to help the IRA and moved explosives from an arms dump to a safe house. He was then approached by officers from the Royal Ulster Constabulary's Special Branch who said he could be prosecuted for the offence. The officers said if Fenton agreed to work for them as an informer he would not be prosecuted, and he would be paid in addition. After agreeing to a further meeting with the officers, Fenton tried to extricate himself from the situation by attempting to start a new life in Australia with his wife and four children. His immigration application was rejected by the Australian High Commission Consulate in Edinburgh, and Fenton started working as an informer for Special Branch in 1982. He started a new job as a salesman for an estate agent, and shortly after started his own estate agency named Ideal Homes based on the Falls Road. In his role as an estate agent Fenton had access to empty homes that were for sale, which he allowed the IRA to use as safe houses, arms dumps and meeting places for IRA leaders and active service units. Special Branch bugged the houses using covert listening devices, enabling them to gather intelligence in order to try to prevent IRA attacks. Over twenty IRA members were arrested in possession of firearms, and several IRA bombing units were arrested as they travelled to targets. A Special Branch officer said of Fenton:

Joe devastated the IRA in west Belfast in the mid-1980s. I was told he loved his work and got a great deal of pleasure after operations were compromised. He was a very willing agent and tried on at least two occasions to entrap senior republicans. But it was probably only a matter of time before he was caught out and by late 1988 he was under suspicion.

Fenton had previously been under suspicion in 1985 following a series of compromised IRA operations. The IRA's Internal Security Unit (ISU) began an investigation, but Fenton diverted suspicion away from himself by providing the names of two other informers, Gerard and Catherine Mahon who were husband and wife. The Mahons were interrogated by the ISU and confessed to informing, and were found shot dead in an alleyway in the Turf Lodge area on 8 September 1985. Fenton again came under suspicion in 1988 after four IRA members were arrested at a house in the Andersonstown area of Belfast which was being used as a mortar factory. Only a few people had knowledge of the location of the factory, and the ISU began a new investigation. As a result of the new investigation the ISU concluded there was a link between compromised IRA operations and homes provided by Fenton. Fenton's professional life was also investigated, and his sudden ability to start an estate agency business in the early 1980s could not be explained. Fenton's handlers in Special Branch stopped paying Fenton when the IRA stopped using properties provided by him, and by the end of 1988 Ideal Homes was facing closure. By then Fenton was working as a taxi driver to supplement his income, and in early 1989 Ideal Homes ceased trading when the offices were closed by Fenton's landlord due to unpaid rent.

== England ==
Former Force Research Unit operative Martin Ingram states that Fenton was taken out of Northern Ireland and transported to England by his handlers in Special Branch. Ingram states Fenton wanted to return to Northern Ireland, and asked for help from Andrew Hunter, an MP for the Conservative Party. Fenton returned to Northern Ireland, with Hunter stating "Special Branch told me that if he came home he would be killed very quickly. They warned me he was a marked man and that it was dangerous to be associated with him and I passed this on to him, but he still went back". According to Ingram, while back in Belfast Fenton continued to pass information to Special Branch, and in early February 1989 a planned IRA mortar attack was prevented and six IRA members were arrested.

Author and journalist Martin Dillon states Fenton fled to England from Northern Ireland of his own accord, based on an interview with a senior IRA member with access to details of Fenton's court-martial. Dillon states that Fenton was ordered to return to Northern Ireland by his handlers in Special Branch, and say he had gone to England to see a boxing match. According to the IRA, Special Branch knew Fenton faced execution if he returned and that he was deliberately sacrificed to preoccupy the IRA and divert suspicion from another informer Stakeknife operating within the IRA's Belfast Brigade.

== Death ==
The IRA abducted Fenton on 24 February 1989, and took him to a house in the Lenadoon area of Belfast. He was interrogated by the ISU and confessed to working as an informer for Special Branch, and was court-martialled. Fenton was found dead in an alley in Lenadoon on 26 February 1989; he had been shot four times. The following day the IRA issued a statement that Fenton had been killed because he was a "British agent". In accordance with standard procedure the RUC denied Fenton had any connection with the police, while Fenton's father Patrick blamed the RUC for his son's death. The IRA had shown Fenton's written confession to his father, and Patrick Fenton stated:

Having seen and read evidence which was presented to me I accept his death and wish to say that the position in which he was placed, due to pressures brought to bear upon him by the Special Branch, led directly to the death of my son.

At Fenton's funeral the local priest, Father Tom Toner, criticised the role of Special Branch in Fenton's death stating:

The IRA is not the only secret, death-dealing agent in our midst. Secret agents of the state have a veneer of respectability on its dark deeds which disguises its work of corruption. They work secretly in dark places unseen, seeking little victims like Joe whom they can crush and manipulate for their own purposes. Their actions too corrupt the cause they purport to serve.

Toner was also critical of the IRA's actions stating:

To you the IRA and all who support you or defend you, we have to say that we feel dirty today. Foul and dirty deeds by Irishmen are making Ireland a foul and dirty place, for it is things done by Irishmen that make us unclean. What the British could never do, what the Unionists could never do, you have done. You have made us bow our heads in shame and that is a dirty feeling. The IRA is like a cancer in the body of Ireland, spreading death, killing and corruption. It is the unrelenting enemy of life and the community is afraid because it cannot see or identify it. We want the cancer of the IRA removed from our midst but not by means that will leave the moral fibre of society damaged and the system unclean. Fighting evil by corrupt means kills pawns like Joe and leaves every one of us vulnerable and afraid. And it allows Joe's killers to draw a sickening veneer of respectability over cold-blooded murder and to wash their hands like Pontius Pilate.

Fenton was buried at St Agnes' Church in Andersonstown, Belfast.
