= Kevin Fulton =

British counterintelligence agent

Peter Keeley, who uses the pseudonym Kevin Fulton, is a British agent from Newry, Northern Ireland, who allegedly spied on the Provisional Irish Republican Army (IRA) for MI5. He is believed to be in London, where he is suing the Crown, claiming his military handlers cut off their connections and financial aid to him.

== Background ==
Fulton's real name is purportedly Peter Keeley (born in October 1960), a Catholic from Newry. He joined the British Merchant Navy at the age of 16, and thereafter joined the Royal Irish Rangers at the age of 18. One month into basic training, Fulton was recruited by the Intelligence Corps and asked to volunteer as an undercover agent. After being trained in espionage skills, Fulton was discharged from the British Army and returned to civilian life to infiltrate the IRA.

After settling in the Newry area, Fulton began working in a meat factory while attempting to ingrain himself with local Irish Republicans. As well as continuing to receive a weekly salary in cash from the British government, Fulton was also provided with a car by his handlers in the Force Research Unit. He subsequently became friendly with Patrick Joseph ‘Mooch’ Blair, who was on-the-run in Dundalk in relation to an improvised mortar attack, and eventually Fulton was accepted into the IRA as a volunteer. In 1991, Fulton left his role as a double agent due to the stress involved and went to work in Euro Disney for a short time. He returned to Ireland the following year and was thereafter handled by MI5 as well as British Army Intelligence until the mid-90s.

Fulton then became an operative for British Customs and Excise before registering as an informant for the Royal Ulster Constabulary. In 1997, Fulton was granted a “participating informant” status, which allowed him to participate in criminal activities with the consent of his RUC handlers. Sometime in the late-90s, suspicions were aroused that Fulton may have been a British agent, and he was exfiltrated from Ireland by his handlers at his request. In 2001, Fulton was allegedly sentenced to death by the IRA via court martial in his absence.

== Smithwick Tribunal ==
In later years, Fulton gave evidence to the Smithwick Tribunal, in which he reasserted his claim that Garda Owen Corrigan was a double agent for the IRA. During the tribunal, lawyers acting for ‘Mooch’ Blair put it to Fulton that their client had not inducted him into the IRA in the 1980s and that he was considered a "gofer" whose main function was to carry out menial tasks. The tribunal also heard that Fulton had previously been dismissed as a Walter Mitty character and as a fantasist by former Chief Constable of the RUC Ronnie Flanagan. However, Fulton's former RUC handlers attested to the tribunal in regards to his credibility, and described how he worked with Customs to help identify a warehouse in Belgium linked to drug trafficking and cigarette smuggling. He also provided quality information in relation to drug dealing and fraud offences in Northern Ireland.

== Undercover activity ==
In his book Unsung Hero, Fulton claims he worked undercover as a British Army agent within the IRA. He was believed to have operated predominantly inside the IRA's South Down Brigade, as well as concentrating on the heavy IRA activity in neighbouring South Armagh. Fulton and four members of his IRA unit in Newry reportedly pioneered the use of flash guns to detonate bombs.

In one incident, Fulton was questioned on responsibility for designing firing mechanisms used in a horizontal mortar attack on a Royal Ulster Constabulary (RUC) armoured patrol car on Merchants Quay, Newry, County Down, on 27 March 1992. Colleen McMurray, a constable (aged 34) died and another constable was seriously injured. Fulton claims he tipped off his MI5 handler that an attack was likely.

== Arrest ==
On 5 November 2006, he was released without charge after being arrested in London, and transferred to Belfast to be questioned about his knowledge or involvement in the deaths of Irish People's Liberation Organisation member Eoin Morley (aged 23), Royal Ulster Constabulary officer Colleen McMurray (34), and Ranger Cyril Smith (aged 21). "I personally did not kill people", he stated. His lawyers asked the British Ministry of Defence to provide him and his family with new identities, relocation and immediate implementation of the complete financial package, including his army pension and other discharge benefits, which he had been reportedly promised by the MoD for his covert tour of duty. His ex-wife, Margaret Keeley, filed a lawsuit in early 2014 for full access to documents relating to her ex-husband. She claims to have been wrongfully arrested and falsely imprisoned during a three-day period in 1994 following a purported attempt by the IRA to assassinate a senior detective in East Belfast.

== Legal cases ==
On 26 November 2013, it was reported that The Irish News had won a legal battle after a judge ruled against Keeley's lawsuit against the newspaper for breach of privacy and copyright, by publishing his photograph, which thereby also, he argued, endangered his life. Belfast District Judge Isobel Brownlie stated at least twice that she was not impressed with Keeley's evidence and described him as "disingenuous". Under British law, Keeley will also be billed for the newspaper's legal costs.

On 31 January 2014, the Belfast High Court ruled that Fulton had to pay damages to Eilish Morley, the mother of IPLO member Eoin Morley, shot dead aged 23 by the IRA. The order was issued based upon his failure to appear in court. The scale of the payout for which he is liable was to be assessed at a later stage but was never published.

== Association with Tommy Robinson ==
Nick Lowles of Hope Not Hate published a book on Tommy Robinson in which he says Fulton worked from early 2020 as a "surveillance officer" for far-right activist Tommy Robinson.
