= Murder of Gillian Johnston =

1988 IRA murder in Northern Ireland

Gillian Johnston was a chemist and shop worker from Northern Ireland who was murdered by the IRA on 18 March 1988; she was aged 21 at the time of her murder.

== Overview ==
Johnston was a 21-year-old chemist and shop worker from Tawnaghgorm, Leggs, near Belleek, County Fermanagh. She had been engaged for two years, having dated her fiancé since she was fifteen. Johnston and her fiancé were sitting in her father's car, outside her home, when members of the IRA fired 27 bullets, killing her and wounding her fiancé.

== After ==
The IRA later claimed the murder was a mistake and that the intended target had been Johnston's brother, whom they had claimed was a member of the Ulster Defence Regiment (UDR). The IRA later stated it had been mistaken about Johnston's brother, as well.

The IRA disbanded the unit which carried out the attack in reaction to public revulsion at the killing of Johnston and the killing of other individuals. The Gardaí linked a man in his mid-20s, a key member of the Ballyshannon ASU, to the murders of Johnston, Harry Keys, and of William Hassard and Frederick Love. There was unconfirmed speculation that this unit was also responsible for the Remembrance Day bombing in Enniskillen in November 1987. Johnston was described by her employer as:

"... the kind of girl who was always smiling. I don't think I ever heard her say a bad word about anyone, people are just horrified."

== See also ==
- Jeffery Agate
- Killings of Nick Spanos and Stephen Melrose
- Murder of Jean McConville
- Murder of Thomas Oliver

== Sources ==
- McKittrick, Kelters, Feeney, Thompson. Lost Lives: The stories of the men, women and children who died as a result of the Northern Ireland troubles (1999/2006); ISBN 1-84018-227-X
