= Murder of James Curran =

2005 political murder in Ireland

James Curran (c. 1962 – 3 April 2005) was the victim of a politically charged murder conspiracy in Ireland.

== Background ==
James Curran was a native of The Liberties, Dublin, a neighborhood heavily beset since the 1980s by both drugs abuse and drug dealing. From a young age "Jimmy", as he was called by friends, was a fitness fanatic who regularly ran marathons and had a keen interest in martial arts for which he won numerous awards and even a world title in kickboxing.

Curran repeatedly denounced the involvement of former Irish republican paramilitaries in extorting protection money from well-known drug dealers in the south inner city. In return for these payments, the IRA both allowed the dealers to continue with their business, but were also on call to help the drug dealers with any "difficulties".

== Christmas incident ==
In a Dublin pub shortly after Christmas 2004, Curran witnessed Bernard Dempsey and "his associates taking an envelope of cash from members of a well-known heroin dealing gang". Dempsey was a former local Provisional IRA commander turned "election activist" for Sinn Féin's Aengus Ó Snodaigh. In response to this, Curran, "who had personal experience of the damage heroin had done to his local community ... began shouting down the bar at Dempsey—'Here, I'll buy you a pint. This is not drug money. This is clean money'". This infuriated Dempsey.

== Green Lizard pub ==
On 3 April 2005, Curran was enjoying himself at a karaoke event while having a pint a short distance from his family home. That night Dempsey was also present and, when his attempts to intimidate Curran into leaving the pub failed, he left himself only to return moments later with a handgun. Dempsey walked up meters behind Curran—who was sitting at a table with Dempsey's sister in Green Lizard pub—and leaning on an associate's shoulder to aim his weapon, he shot him three times through the back of the head in full view of customers. He then gestured to the crowd of shocked onlookers with his gun, and walked out of the pub as calmly as he had walked up to his victim moments before.

== Aftermath ==
Bernard Dempsey was arrested soon after, but conviction seemed unlikely as several of the witnesses were told they would be murdered if they gave evidence. Two witnesses, including Dempsey's sister, still came forward and gave evidence at Dempsey's trial. A unanimous guilty verdict was given, which resulted in his conviction for life.

"In his victim impact statement, Bernard Curran, a brother of the victim, told the court his entire family had been 'traumatised by this act of wanton destruction on a young life'. Speaking directly to Dempsey he said: "You've put a hole in my mother's heart. You've put a hole in all our hearts. and they have been filled with grief which is everlasting. I hope you can live with that.' After the verdict he [Curran's brother] said: 'I feel shocked. There are no words for it." He added: 'Justice is served.'"

== Personal life ==
Curran was a champion kick-boxer and father of one. He was also the 4th brother of 6 that grew up in the Liberties area of Dublin and was the only member of his family who pursued martial arts from a very young age, going on to mentor and coach many kids from the area for years.
