= Internal Security Unit =

IRA counter-intelligence and interrogation unit

The Internal Security Unit (ISU) was the counter-intelligence and interrogation unit of the Provisional Irish Republican Army (IRA). This unit was often referred to as the Nutting Squad, in reference to the fact that many of the informers uncovered were shot in the back of the head (the "nut").

The unit is thought to have had jurisdiction over both Northern and Southern Commands of the IRA, (encompassing the whole of Ireland), and to have been directly attached to IRA General Headquarters (GHQ).

== Duties ==
The group was believed to have had a number of briefs:

- Security and character vetting of new recruits to the IRA,
- Collecting and collating material on failed and compromised IRA operations,
- Collecting and collating material on suspect or compromised individuals (informers),
- Interrogation and debriefing of suspects and compromised individuals,
- Carrying out killings and lesser punishments of those judged guilty by IRA courts martial.

The ISU was believed to have unlimited access to the members, apparatus and resources of the IRA in carrying out its duties. Its remit could not be countermanded except by order of the Army Council.

Depositions obtained as part of its operation would ideally be noted on paper, and if possible recorded for the purposes of propaganda.

== Activity ==
The ISU carried out debriefing of IRA volunteers following their detention by security forces operating in Northern Ireland. These interviews would take place to discover if a volunteer had betrayed information or secrets of the organisation. They would also take place in the event of an operation, weapons cache, or unit being exposed to danger or uncovered.

The membership of the IRA and wider republican community were expected to comply with requests for information made by the ISU, this information then being used to build or refute accusations made against an IRA volunteer.

== See also ==
- Disappeared (Northern Ireland)
- Stakeknife, a double agent thought to be Freddie Scappaticci
- Joseph Fenton
- John Joe McGee
- Murders of Catherine and Gerard Mahon
- Murder of Thomas Oliver

== Further information/sources ==
- Ingram, Martin with Greg Harkin. "Stakeknife: Britain's Secret Agents in Ireland", O'Brien Press, 2004. ISBN 9780862788438
