= Murder of Thomas Oliver =

Murder of an Irish farmer by the Provisional Irish Republican Army

- Date: July 18, 1991; 35 years ago
- Attack type: Abduction, torture murder
- Victims: Thomas Oliver, aged 43
- Perpetrator: Provisional Irish Republican Army
- Motive: Passing information to the Garda Síochána

Thomas Oliver was a 43-year-old Irish farmer who was tortured and murdered by the Provisional Irish Republican Army in July 1991, reportedly for passing information to the Garda Síochána. However, in the wake of the Stakeknife case it began to be suspected that Freddie Scappaticci – who ran the IRA's Internal Security Unit, which was responsible for killing informers – killed Oliver to conceal his identity as a double agent.

== Overview ==
A farmer with no connections to any paramilitary group or the security forces, Oliver was a 43-year-old father of seven children, and a native of Riverstown, County Louth, on the Cooley peninsula, near Dundalk. He was abducted by armed members of the Provisional Irish Republican Army (IRA) near the border on 18 July and his body was found the following day in South Armagh. He had been shot several times in the head.

The IRA, via An Phoblacht, claimed he had been passing information to the Garda Síochána. They also claimed that Oliver had aided the IRA, providing sheds to store weapons and explosives, but that over a six-year period he had given information to the Gardaí, leading to several arrests. His body showed clear evidence of massive pre-mortem trauma, indicating extensive torture. A family member stated:

Whoever they were, they thumped him and thumped him to get him to say what they wanted him to say. After the post-mortem a priest said it looked liked they'd dropped concrete blocks on every bone in his body.

Thomas Oliver was survived by his wife, six daughters and a son. His mother, Annie, died in September 1991, reportedly from the shock and strain of her son's death. The Irish Times of 24 November 1991, reported:

The men who delivered him to his executioners are known in the locality. To a large extent they have been ostracised, told in some pubs that their custom is not wanted and that their company is not welcome. In some cases their own families have disowned them. Tom Oliver has become a symbol of every family on this island whose lives have been shattered by the men of violence.

== Aftermath ==
In the wake of the Stakeknife case, where a highly placed member of the IRA was revealed to be a British double agent, it began to be suspected that Freddie Scappaticci – who ran the IRA's Internal Security Unit, which was responsible for torturing and killing Thomas Oliver – killed Oliver to conceal his identity.

It emerged that, in 1989, Oliver, in the course of drainage work on his farm, unwittingly uncovered a barrel. He reported the discovery to the Gardaí but was unaware of its contents. The barrel contained IRA guns hidden on Oliver's land but without his knowledge. Two of those questioned about the arms in 1989 were County Louth natives Michael Christopher McDonald and Declan John Rafferty. Both men were at the time members of the IRA and later went on to join the Real IRA. In 2002, along with Fintan Paul O'Farrell, also a native of County Louth, the Slovak Three were sentenced to 30 years imprisonment for arms smuggling.

An Phoblacht ("War News" section) on 25 July 1991 was headlined IRA Executes Informer. The section justified Oliver's murder:

The IRA has a duty to protect its organisation, its volunteers and the back-up provided by its supporters. Tom Oliver's death was due to his willingness to act as an agent for the Dublin Government's Special Branch.

In 2002, Thomas Oliver's son Eugene (aged 13 at the time of his father's death) wrote a public letter to the Dundalk newspaper, Argus, demanding answers to a series of questions directed at Sinn Féin's election candidate, Arthur Morgan regarding his father. Argus published the letter on its front page. Sinn Féin declined to comment; a spokesman said the party had no comment to make on the Real IRA trio, stating "They have nothing to do with us". Morgan was elected as TD for the Louth constituency, serving from 2002 to 2011; he was succeeded by Gerry Adams.

=== 2021 new DNA evidence ===
Investigators working in Operation Kenova announced that they had obtained new DNA evidence relating to the murder.

== See also ==
Similar IRA murders

- List of kidnappings
- Murder of Jean McConville
- Charles Armstrong
- Murders of Catherine and Gerard Mahon
- Columba McVeigh
- Peter Wilson (Northern Ireland kidnapping and disappearance case)

== References and sources ==
Notes

Sources

- Lost Lives: The stories of the men, women and children who died as a result of the Northern Ireland Troubles, pp. 1242–43, McKittrick, Kelters, Feeney, Thompson, 1999 (2006); ISBN 1-84018-227-X.
