= Freddie Scappaticci =

IRA member and British intelligence agent alleged to be Stakeknife (1946–2023)

- Born: 12 January 1946; The Markets, Belfast, Northern Ireland
- Died: 20 March 2023 (aged 77)
- Other name: Frank Cowley
- Occupation: Bricklayer
- Organization: Provisional Irish Republican Army
- Known for: Alleged British Army agent codenamed Stakeknife
- Children: 6

Freddie Scappaticci (12 January 1946 – 20 March 2023), later known as Frank Cowley, was a member of the Provisional Irish Republican Army (IRA) and its Internal Security Unit (ISU). He was widely identified in media reports and by former intelligence personnel as Stakeknife, a British Army Force Research Unit agent inside the IRA. Scappaticci denied that he had been an agent or that he was Stakeknife.

Operation Kenova, the police investigation into Stakeknife and related cases, did not officially confirm Stakeknife's identity because of the British government's policy of neither confirm nor deny. Its final report said, however, that claims that Scappaticci was Stakeknife were "almost universally treated as true", and that Kenova had established that Scappaticci told his wife and a female associate that he was Stakeknife. In February 2026, the Taoiseach, Micheál Martin, named Scappaticci as Stakeknife in the Dáil. Scappaticci died in 2023 without being charged with Troubles-related offences.

== Early life ==
Scappaticci was born in Belfast on 12 January 1946. He grew up in the Markets area of the city. His father, Daniel Scappaticci, was an Italian immigrant who had settled in Belfast in the 1920s. Some reports referred to him as Alfredo or Frederico, but Scappaticci said in 2003 that his name was Freddie and that this was the name on his birth certificate.

Scappaticci worked as a bricklayer. In 1970, he was fined for riotous assembly. The following year he was interned without trial in Long Kesh during Operation Demetrius. He was married and had six children.

== IRA activity ==
By 1980, Scappaticci had become a senior figure in the IRA's Internal Security Unit, part of IRA Northern Command. The ISU was responsible for counter-intelligence, including the investigation of suspected informers, compromised IRA operations and volunteers released after questioning by the Royal Ulster Constabulary or the British Army.

The ISU was also known as the "Nutting Squad", a reference to the killing of suspected informers by shooting them in the head. Scappaticci was reported to have admitted involvement in the murder of Joe Fenton, a suspected informer killed by the IRA in 1989. Operation Kenova later said that Scappaticci was a critical person of interest in its investigation and that it had found strong evidence of very serious criminality on his part, although he was never charged or convicted of Troubles-related offences.

== Stakeknife allegations ==
=== Public identification ===
Stakeknife was the codename of a high-level agent inside the IRA who was handled by British military intelligence. In May 2003, Scappaticci was named as Stakeknife by the Sunday Herald, the Irish edition of The People, the Sunday Tribune and the Sunday World. The allegation was repeated in later reporting and by former intelligence personnel.

Scappaticci denied the allegation. In 2003, he brought judicial-review proceedings seeking to require the British government to state publicly that he was not Stakeknife. The application was dismissed because of the government's policy of neither confirming nor denying intelligence matters. The IRA also initially rejected the allegation and suggested that it was an attempt by the British state to undermine the republican movement.

=== Alleged intelligence role ===
Former British Army intelligence operative Martin Ingram alleged that Scappaticci was the agent known as Stakeknife and that he was handled by the Force Research Unit (FRU). Reports alleged that Stakeknife supplied intelligence to British handlers while maintaining a senior position in the ISU. The Guardian reported in 2003 that he was said to have been paid £80,000 a year.

Former British Army general Sir John Wilsey, who commanded the Army in Northern Ireland, described Stakeknife as an exceptionally valuable agent and referred to him as the "golden egg". Operation Kenova later rejected claims that Stakeknife had saved hundreds of lives. Its interim and final reports estimated that intelligence attributable to Stakeknife saved between high single figures and low double figures of identifiable lives, and concluded that it was probable that more lives were lost than saved as a consequence of his continued operation as an agent.

=== Alleged protection by the state ===
A central controversy was whether British handlers and state agencies protected Stakeknife from exposure or prosecution despite his alleged involvement in IRA abductions, interrogations and murders. Families of victims and human-rights groups alleged that state agencies failed to prevent killings in order to protect the agent's cover. Operation Kenova investigated the alleged conduct of IRA members, police officers, British Army personnel, intelligence handlers and prosecutors.

One frequently cited allegation concerned the 1987 killing of Francisco Notarantonio, a 66-year-old Belfast man shot by loyalist gunmen. The Guardian reported that Notarantonio's name had been passed to loyalists by FRU agent Brian Nelson in order to divert attention away from Stakeknife.

== Media recordings ==
In 1993, Scappaticci met representatives of the ITV programme The Cook Report and discussed IRA activity and the alleged role of Martin McGuinness in the organisation. The meeting took place on 26 August 1993 in the car park of the Culloden Hotel in Cultra, County Down, and was recorded without Scappaticci's knowledge. The recording later became public after the 2003 Stakeknife allegations.

The Kenova final report said that the belief that Scappaticci had betrayed the republican movement by acting as an agent, and the knowledge that he had spoken to The Cook Report, put his life at risk and led to his resettlement in England under a new identity at public expense.

In March 2024, the BBC broadcast previously unpublished footage of Scappaticci outside his former home in 2004 as part of the documentary Our Dirty War: The British State and the IRA.

== Operation Kenova and legal proceedings ==
In October 2015, the Police Service of Northern Ireland announced that Stakeknife would be investigated in connection with at least 24 murders. In June 2016, it was announced that the investigation, known as Operation Kenova, would be led by Bedfordshire Police and would examine alleged crimes by IRA members, British Army personnel, police officers and others.

Scappaticci was arrested in January 2018 as part of the Kenova investigation in relation to offences connected with its terms of reference. A laptop recovered during the search of his home contained extreme pornographic images. In December 2018, at Westminster Magistrates' Court, Scappaticci pleaded guilty to possessing extreme pornographic material and was sentenced to three months' imprisonment, suspended for 12 months.

On 29 October 2020, the Public Prosecution Service for Northern Ireland decided that Scappaticci would not be prosecuted for perjury. The PPS also decided not to prosecute a number of former security-service personnel believed to have been connected to his handling, and a former member of the PPS.

The Kenova interim report was published in March 2024. The final report was published in December 2025. The final report criticised the continued refusal to confirm or deny whether Scappaticci was Stakeknife, stating that it had a severe impact on victims and families, legitimate public debate, media freedom, open justice and public confidence in state authorities and the criminal-justice system.

== Later life and death ==
After being named as Stakeknife in 2003, Scappaticci left Northern Ireland and lived in England under a new identity at public expense. Kenova's final report recorded that he changed his name to Frank Cowley by deed poll in January 2020 and that he had to relocate several times because of death threats.

Scappaticci died on 20 March 2023, aged 77. Operation Kenova said that he died of natural causes following an illness. His death was not made public until after his burial. In 2025, the High Court in London ordered that his will be sealed because public inspection would be undesirable or inappropriate.

== Undisclosed files ==
In August 2024, Livingstone wrote to the Secretary of State for Northern Ireland, Hilary Benn, after MI5 identified additional material relating to Stakeknife that had not previously been disclosed to Kenova. RTÉ reported that several hundred pages of previously unseen files had been found and that their assessment delayed publication of the final report. BBC News reported that Baroness O'Loan, a member of Kenova's steering committee, criticised MI5 over the late disclosure and said that the new material could affect what families had previously been told.

The final report later recorded that difficulties with access to MI5 material had affected the investigation, although Kenova had earlier believed that the problems related to process rather than intentional withholding.

== See also ==
- Murder of Thomas Oliver
