= Robert Keating O'Neill =

American librarian, archivist, and historian

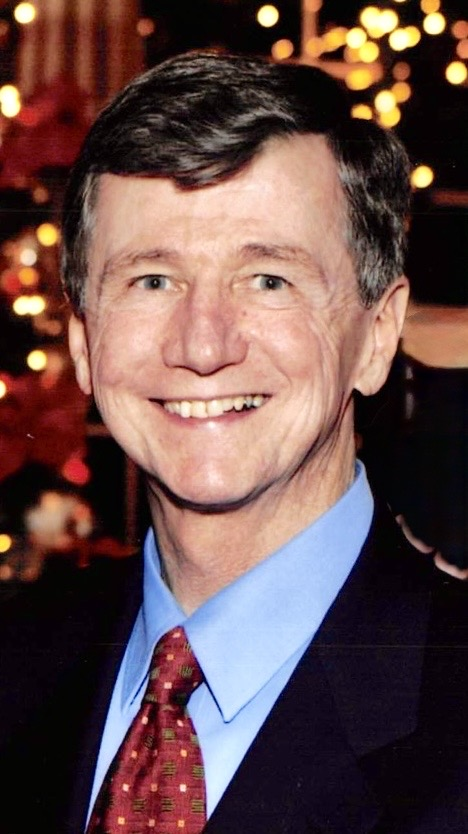
- O'Neill circa 2010
- Born: 29 January 1945; Lowell, Massachusetts
- Died: 11 August 2025 (aged 80); Gilbert, Arizona
- Occupations: Librarian; professor
- Spouse: Helen Ann Parke O'Neill
- Children: 6
- Awards: Order of Bernardo O'Higgins (2010)

Academic background
- Education: Merrimack College (B.A.); University of Arizona (M.A.); University of Chicago (M.A.) (PhD)

Academic work
- Discipline: History, Library Science, Archival Science, Political Science
- Sub-discipline: Irish literature, Irish history, and European history
- Institutions: Indiana State University, Indiana Historical Society, and Boston College
- Notable works: Irish Libraries: Archives, Museums & Genealogical Centres

Robert Keating O'Neill (January 29, 1945 – August 11, 2025) was an American librarian, archivist, and historian known for his tenure as director of the John J. Burns Library at Boston College from 1987 to 2013. During his career, he was a curator of special collections and rare books, with a particular focus on Irish literature and Irish history. O'Neill played a significant role in expanding the Burns Library's holdings. He was also involved in notable events such as an international antiquities recovery operation involving the Federal Bureau of Investigation (FBI) and the controversial Belfast Project oral history initiative.

== Early life and education ==
O'Neill was born in 1945 in Lowell, Massachusetts, to Charles O'Neill and Veronica (née Leahy) O'Neill. He attended St. Patrick's Elementary School and Keith Academy in Lowell. He earned a Bachelor of Arts in history from Merrimack College in 1966. He then received a Master of Arts in European history from the University of Arizona in 1968. O'Neill obtained a PhD in early modern European history in 1975 and a Master of Arts in library science in 1976 from the University of Chicago. From 1968 to 1971, O'Neill served in the Army National Guard of Arizona and the United States Army Reserves.

== Career ==
From 1976 to 1981, he served as director of the Cunningham Memorial Special Collections Library at Indiana State University, where he also held the position of associate professor of library science in the College of Arts and Sciences. He then moved to Indianapolis, serving as director of the Indiana Historical Society Library from 1981 to 1987.

=== Boston College ===
In 1987, O'Neill was appointed director of the John J. Burns Library of Rare Books and Special Collections at Boston College that had opened in 1986. He focused on restoring staff morale following the conviction of his predecessor for theft of rare materials. O'Neill expanded the library's collections, emphasizing areas such as Irish literature, Boston history, and Jesuitica. O'Neill supported initiatives like the Irish Music Center at Boston College. He also delivered presentations on the library's collections and digital projects, such as at the University of Galway in 2009. He taught a course on Irish political history in the political science department. He retired in 2013.

==== Irish collections ====
He assembled library and archival collections of the four Irish authors who have thus far been awarded the Nobel Prize for Literature: William Butler Yeats (1923), George Bernard Shaw (1925), Samuel Beckett (1969), and Seamus Heaney (1995). During his tenure, he helped acquire the largest collection of W.B. Yeats's manuscripts outside of Ireland. He oversaw the exhibit featuring the mummified arm of Irish boxing legend Dan Donnelly in "The Fighting Irishmen: A Celebration of the Celtic Warrior," which highlighted Irish boxing history and the immigrant experience in America. O'Neill facilitated the acquisition of over 3,000 books and 60,000 letters, manuscripts, and notes by Graham Greene, forming the largest archive of the author's work at that time. He also obtained the archives of Northern Ireland photojournalist Bobbie Hanvey, which consisted of 75,000 images not only of the paramilitary conflicts and daily life during the decades of "The Troubles" but also photographs of Heaney and other Irish cultural icons. He also helped obtain a rare 15th-century Irish book, ''The Vision of Tundal''. In 2003, he helped bring the "Troubled Images" exhibition of posters from Northern Ireland to Boston College. That exhibit highlighted propaganda during The Troubles.

==== Recovery of stolen Irish artifacts ====
In 1991, O'Neill assisted in an international sting operation coordinated by the FBI and Irish authorities to recover stolen Irish antiquities. His involvement led to the arrest of the dealer and the return of the artifacts to Ireland. For his role, he earned a citation from the FBI Director William S. Sessions.

=== Belfast Project ===
O'Neill played the role of custodian in the Belfast Project, an oral history initiative documenting Northern Ireland's Troubles. In 2000, journalist Ed Moloney introduced O'Neill to former IRA member Anthony McIntyre, proposing the project to collect confidential interviews with paramilitaries. O'Neill and the project supervisor BC historian Thomas Hachey (O'Neill's direct supervisor), supported, oversaw, and secured funding for the effort through Boston College and its benefactors, which ran from 2001 to 2006 and amassed around 50 interviews. The participant contracts promised confidentiality until the interviewee's death. He facilitated the project's first public output by releasing tapes of deceased interviewees Brendan Hughes and David Ervine for Moloney's 2010 book, Voices from the Grave: Two Men's War in Ireland, which drew on their accounts and implicated Sinn Féin leader Gerry Adams in the 1972 murder of Jean McConville.

The book's revelations prompted U.S. Department of Justice subpoenas in May and August 2011, issued under the U.S.-U.K. Mutual Legal Assistance Treaty (MLAT) at the request of the Police Services of Northern Ireland (PSNI) who were still investigating McConville's abduction and other crimes. Boston College initially resisted by invoking academic privilege in motions to quash, but federal courts ordered the release of select tapes, leading to 11 being handed over by 2014. The contents of the interviews led to the arrest of Adams, but he did not ultimately face charges.

The Project faced criticism for mishandling confidentiality assurances, as the contracts may have misled participants about protections against subpoenas issued in the United States. Boston College signed an agreement with Moloney ensuring interviewee contracts guaranteed confidentiality "to the extent American law allows." O'Neill came to regret, however, that the participant contracts didn't specify that the secrecy of the archive may be limited under American law. He more broadly came to regret not obtaining further legal review for participant agreements. O'Neill was accused by Moloney of having lost donor forms, including Dolours Price's, while O'Neill denied the claim, calling it "bizarre" and accusing Moloney of contractual violations. O’Neill’s role in the project is documented in Patrick Radden Keefe’s Say Nothing (book), which was turned into Say Nothing (TV series).

== Personal life ==
O'Neill married Helen Ann Parke, a special education teacher from Concord, Massachusetts, in 1970. They had six children. O'Neill died on August 11, 2025, in Gilbert, Arizona, at the age of 80.

== Publications ==
=== Books ===
- The Honorable John J. Burns Library, a Landmark of America: Its History Through Its Collections (2019)
- Irish Libraries: Archives, Museums & Genealogical Centres (2002, 2007, 2013)
- The Art of the Book from the Early Middle Ages to the Renaissance: A Journey Through a Thousand Years (2000)
- Management of Library and Archival Security: From the Outside Looking in (1998)
- Ulster Libraries: Archives, Museums & Ancestral Heritage Centres (1997)
- English-language dictionaries, 1604-1900 : the catalog of the Warren N. and Suzanne B. Cordell collection (1988)
- Politics and the New Orders in France, 1584-1629: A Study of Jesuit and Capuchin Influence on French Foreign Policy Towards the Habsburgs (1975)

=== Book chapters ===
- The Irish Book in the United States: An Overview, Chapter 17

=== Journal articles ===
- Dr. Johnson, Warren Cordell, and the Love of Books, with James B. Misenheimer Jr. (1983)
- The Federal Writers' Project Files for Indiana (1980)
- Caught in the Web of Words: James Murray and the Oxford English Dictionary (review) (1980)

== Awards and recognitions ==
- Honored by Irish and American governments for recovering stolen Irish artifacts (1991).
- Top 100 Irish Americans by Irish America Magazine (2003).
- Eire Society of Boston’s Gold Medal (2003).
- Ambassador’s Award from the Holyoke, Massachusetts St. Patrick’s Day Parade Committee (2004).
- Government of Chile's Order of Bernardo O'Higgins (2010).
- Anam Cara Award from The Phoenix, Arizona’s Irish Cultural Center (2012).
- Order of St. Patrick from Heritage Publishing, New York City (2015).
