= Thomas Murphy (Irish republican) =

Irish republican (born 1949)

- Tomás Mac Murchaidh
- Born: 26 August 1949 (age 77); Ballybinaby, Hackballscross, County Louth, Ireland
- Military career
- Paramilitary: Provisional IRA
- Rank: Chief of Staff
- Nickname: Slab
- Unit: South Armagh Brigade
- Conflicts: The Troubles

Thomas Murphy (Irish: Tomás Mac Murchaidh: born 26 August 1949), also known as Slab, is an Irish republican, believed to be a former Chief of Staff of the Provisional Irish Republican Army. His farm, in Ballybinaby, Hackballscross, straddles County Armagh and County Louth on the border between Northern Ireland and the Republic of Ireland. In December 2015, Murphy was found guilty on nine counts of tax evasion following a lengthy investigation by the Criminal Assets Bureau of the Republic of Ireland. In February 2016, Murphy was jailed and sentenced to 18 months in prison. One of three brothers, Murphy is a lifelong bachelor who lived on the Louth side of his farm before his imprisonment.

== IRA involvement ==
Murphy was allegedly involved with the South Armagh Brigade of the IRA before being elected chief of staff by the IRA Army Council. Toby Harnden (ex-correspondent for the Daily Telegraph) named him as planning the Warrenpoint ambush of 1979, in which 18 British soldiers were killed, and he was also allegedly implicated in the Mullaghmore bombing the same day, which killed four people (including two children and Louis Mountbatten, 1st Earl Mountbatten of Burma). Murphy was involved in smuggling huge stockpiles of weapons from Libya in the 1980s and was a member of the Army Council that decided to end its first ceasefire with the 1996 Docklands bombing in London that killed two men.

Accused by the Sunday Times of directing an IRA bombing campaign in Britain, in 1987 Murphy unsuccessfully sued the paper for libel in Dublin. The original verdict was overturned by the court of appeal because of omissions in the judge's summing up and there was a retrial, which Murphy also lost. At the retrial, both Sean O'Callaghan and Eamon Collins, former members of the Provisional Irish Republican Army, testified against Murphy, as did members of the Gardaí, Irish customs officials, British Army and local TD Brendan McGahon. Collins, who had also written a book about his experiences, Killing Rage, was beaten and killed by having a spike driven through his face, near his home in Newry eight months later. In 1998, a Dublin court dismissed Murphy's case after a high-profile trial, during which Murphy stated that he had: "Never been a member of the IRA, no way" and claimed not to know where the Maze prison was. The jury ruled, however, that he was an IRA commander and a smuggler.

The Sunday Times subsequently published statements given by Adrian Hopkins, the skipper who ferried weapons from Libya to the IRA, to the French authorities who intercepted the fifth and final Eksund shipment. Hopkins detailed how Murphy met a named Libyan agent in Greece, paid for the weapons to be imported, and helped unload them when they arrived in Ireland. According to A Secret History of the IRA by Ed Moloney, Murphy has been the IRA Army Council's chief of staff since 1997. Toby Harnden's Bandit Country: The IRA & South Armagh also details Murphy's IRA involvement.

On 20 September 2016 the BBC's Spotlight aired a programme in which an alleged British spy who had infiltrated the IRA claimed that in 2006, Murphy had demanded the killing of Denis Donaldson – an IRA member and British informer – in order to maintain discipline. The BBC said it had tried to contact Murphy but had received no reply. He has yet to respond to the allegation. On 23 September 2016, the Donaldson family's solicitor said that the allegation was "absolute nonsense." He also said that "It does not marry in any way with the lines of inquiry that have been progressed by the Garda or by the Police Ombudsman".

== Smuggling allegations and denials ==
In October 2005, officers of the British Assets Recovery Agency and the Irish Criminal Assets Bureau carried out raids on a number of businesses in Manchester and Dundalk. It was extensively reported in the media that the investigation was aimed at damaging the suspected multi-million-pound empire of Murphy, who according to the BBC's Underworld Rich List, has accumulated up to £40 million through smuggling oil, cigarettes, grain and pigs, as well as through silent or partial ownership in legitimate businesses and in property.

A large, purpose-built underground chamber that Gardaí believe the IRA used for interrogation was discovered close to Murphy's home.

In his first-ever press release, issued on 12 October 2005, Murphy denied he owned any property and denied that he had any links with co-accused Cheshire businessman Dermot Craven (Frank Murphy, Thomas' brother, was a client of Craven's). Thomas Murphy stated:

"I have been a republican all my life and fully support the peace process. I will continue to play whatever role I can, to see it work."

Furthermore, Murphy claimed that he had to sell property to cover his legal fees after his failed libel case against the Sunday Times, and that he made a living from farming. He went on to say:

"There is absolutely no foundation to the allegations about me which have been carried in the media for some time, and repeated at length over the past week, I want to categorically state, for the record, that all of these allegations are totally untrue."

On 9 March 2006, police, soldiers and customs officials from both sides of the Irish border launched a large dawn raid on his house and several other buildings in the border region. Three persons were arrested by the Gardaí, but were released three days after. A fleet of tankers, computers, documents, two shotguns, more than 30,000 cigarettes and the equivalent of 800,000 euros in sterling bank notes, euro bank notes and cheques were seized. Four diesel laundering facilities attached to a major network of storage tanks, some of which were underground, were also found. The Irish Criminal Assets Bureau later obtained seizure orders to take possession of euro cash and cheques and sterling cash and cheques, together worth around one million Euros.

Sinn Féin President Gerry Adams made a public statement in support of Murphy following the March 2006 raids. Under political and media pressure over allegations of the IRA's continued presence in South Armagh, Adams said:

"Tom Murphy is not a criminal. He's a good republican and I read his statement after the Manchester raids and I believe what he says and also and very importantly he is a key supporter of Sinn Féin's peace strategy and has been for a very long time."

He also said:

"I want to deal with what is an effort to portray Tom Murphy as a criminal, as a bandit, as a gang boss, as someone who is exploiting the republican struggle for his own ends, as a multimillionaire. There is no evidence to support any of that."

Commenting in Armagh on Murphy's imprisonment for tax fraud, Arlene Foster, First Minister of Northern Ireland said:

"Whilst some people refer to Murphy as a 'good republican' the people of this area know him to be a criminal."

== Assets seizure and settlement ==
Murphy was arrested in Dundalk, County Louth on 7 November 2007 by detectives from the Criminal Assets Bureau, on charges relating to alleged revenue offences. The following day, he was charged with tax evasion under the Tax Consolidation Act. Murphy was later released on his own bail of €20,000 with an independent surety of €50,000.

On 17 October 2008, in an agreed legal settlement, Murphy and his brothers paid over £1 million in assets and cash to the authorities in Britain and the Republic in settlement of a global crime and fraud investigation relating to proceeds of crime associated with smuggling and money laundering. After an investigation involving the Irish Criminal Assets Bureau and the UK's Serious Organised Crime Agency, more than 625,000 euros (£487,000) in cash and cheques was confiscated by the Republic's courts, while nine properties in northwest England worth £445,000 were confiscated by British courts. Murphy was still fighting a claim in the Republic's courts for tax evasion, relating to non-completion of tax returns for eight years from 1996.

On 26 April 2010, he was further remanded on bail.

In 2011, there were claims that Murphy had become disillusioned with the Northern Ireland peace process and that he had fallen out with Sinn Féin. However, there is no evidence to support he is sympathetic to any dissident republican groups. In March 2013, the Garda and the PSNI, along with members of the Irish Customs Authority and HMRC, raided Murphy's farm on the Louth-Armagh border. The Sunday World reported that two hours prior to the raid, at approximately 4am, fire was seen coming from Murphy's yard. There were serious concerns within the Garda and PSNI that a mole may have tipped off Murphy about the raid hours prior to it, as "Laptops, computer disks and a large amount of documentation had been destroyed in the fires." As a result, an internal Garda investigation took place.

== Tax evasion conviction ==
On 17 December 2015, Murphy was found guilty on nine charges of tax evasion by a three-judge, non-jury Special Criminal Court trial sitting in Dublin, lasting nine weeks. He was tried under anti-terrorist legislation due to the belief by the Director of Public Prosecutions (DPP) that there would not be a fair trial because of the potential of the intimidation of prosecution witnesses and jurors, and the security surrounding the trial (in 1999, a man who testified against Murphy in court was bludgeoned to death after a trial).

Murphy was found guilty on all charges of failing to furnish tax returns on his income as a "cattle farmer" between 1996 and 2004. He was prosecuted following a 14-year-long CAB investigation, which during a raid of his property uncovered bags with more than €250,000 and more than £111,000 sterling in cash, along with documents, diaries and ledgers. He was remanded on bail until early 2016 for sentencing.

On 26 February 2016, Murphy was sentenced to 18 months in prison. None of the jail term was suspended. Following sentencing, he was immediately transferred from court to Ireland's highest-security prison, Portlaoise Prison, reserved for terrorists, dissident republicans and serious gangland criminals, under a heavily armed Garda and Irish Army escort due to security concerns.

Murphy appealed against the conviction in November 2016. His lawyer, John Kearney, claimed that the tax Murphy hadn't paid had in fact been paid by his brother, Patrick. The Court of Appeal dismissed the appeal on all grounds in January 2017.

In January 2017, and scheduled for release in April 2018, Murphy was moved from Midlands Prison in Portlaoise to the Loughan House low-security prison in County Cavan.
