= Belfast Project =

Boston College oral history on the Troubles

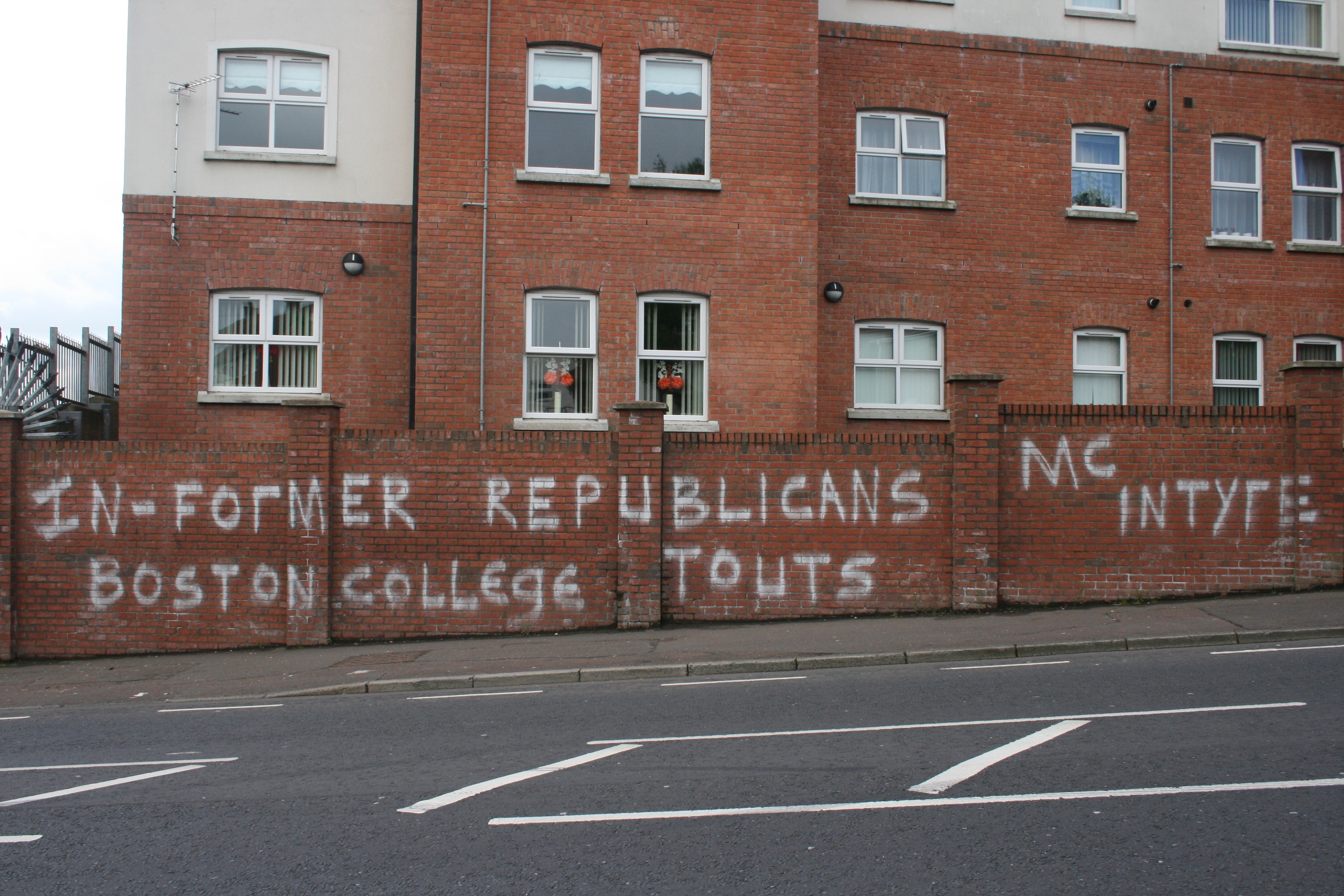
Graffiti in Belfast criticizing the Belfast Project. It reads: "In-former Republicans/Boston College Touts/McIntyre" (2014)

The Belfast Project, also known as the Boston Tapes or the Boston College Tapes, was an oral history initiative based at Boston College in Massachusetts, United States, aimed at documenting personal experiences of paramilitaries during the Troubles, the armed conflict in Northern Ireland from the 1960s – 1990s. Launched in 2000 and concluding interviews in 2006, the project collected confidential testimonies from Republican and Loyalist participants of the conflict, with releases intended only after their deaths to serve as historical resources.

Directed by journalist Ed Moloney, it involved around 50 interviews, but faced intense scrutiny after subpoenas led to the release of select tapes for criminal investigations. In 2014, Boston College terminated the project and offered to return materials to living participants upon request. The project highlighted ethical dilemmas in oral history, including confidentiality limits and researcher biases.

== Establishment ==
Ed Moloney, Robert Keating O'Neill, and Anthony McIntyre played central roles in establishing the oral history initiative. In 2000, Moloney introduced O'Neill to former IRA member Anthony McIntyre, proposing the project to collect confidential interviews with paramilitaries. O'Neill, alongside Boston College historian Thomas Hachey, supported, oversaw, and secured funding for the effort, which ran from 2001 to 2006.

=== Interviews ===
The project conducted around 50 interviews. Former IRA member turned academic Anthony McIntyre conducted interviews with Irish republican paramilitary members including Brendan Hughes, Dolours Price, Ivor Bell, and Richard O'Rawe.

Wilson McArthur, an East Belfast resident with strong loyalist ties, conducted interviews with loyalist paramilitary members.

=== Publication of book ===
Interviews with Hughes and David Ervine were used (after their deaths) as the basis for Moloney's 2010 book Voices From The Grave: Two Men's War in Ireland, drawing attention to the archive. The book drew on their accounts and implicated Sinn Féin leader Gerry Adams in the 1972 murder of Jean McConville. McConville's murder and further interviews from the Belfast Project were the subjects addressed in Patrick Radden Keefe's 2018 book Say Nothing. It was later made into the FX dramatic miniseries Say Nothing.

== Subsequent legal proceedings ==
=== PSNI subpoena ===
The book's revelations prompted U.S. Department of Justice subpoenas in May and August 2011, issued under the U.S.-U.K. Mutual Legal Assistance Treaty at the request of the Police Services of Northern Ireland who were still investigating McConville's abduction and other crimes. Boston College initially resisted by invoking academic privilege in motions to quash, but federal courts ordered the release of select tapes, leading to 11 being handed over by 2014.

Subsequently, interviews dealing with the murder of Jean McConville, one of the "Disappeared" of Northern Ireland, were subpoenaed by the Police Service of Northern Ireland (PSNI). Moloney and McIntyre filed a lawsuit seeking to block this request, arguing that it placed project participants at risk. The ACLU filed a supporting brief.

However, the PSNI ultimately won the resulting court battle, with a United States appeals court decision stating, "The choice to investigate criminal activity belongs to the government and is not subject to veto by academic researchers." Transcripts of interviews with both Price and Hughes were ultimately given to the PSNI.

=== Prosecutions and investigations ===
==== Ivor Bell ====
In 2014, these interviews were used to charge Ivor Bell with soliciting McConville's murder. Portions of the tapes were played in public for the first time during the court proceedings. Ultimately Bell was acquitted as the court found the tapes to be unreliable and they were not admitted as evidence.

==== Gerry Adams ====
These tapes are also thought to have contributed to Gerry Adams's 2014 arrest, in which no charges were ultimately filed.

==== Winston Churchill Rea ====
In 2015, PSNI subpoenaed the project's interviews with loyalist Winston Churchill Rea. Rea unsuccessfully challenged the subpoena, and was charged with 12 crimes, including two murders, the following year. Rea's trial was delayed repeatedly due to his failing health and the coronavirus pandemic. He died in 2023, before the trial could be concluded.

==== Anthony McIntyre ====
Interviewer Anthony McIntyre had himself contributed a recorded interview to the Belfast Project, which were also subsequently subpoenaed by the PSNI in 2018; in April 2024, the courts ultimately ruled in favor of the PSNI accessing the tapes, only five days before the cut-off date of May 1, 2024 set by the Troubles Legacy Act, after which point all active historical investigations and no further inquests into Troubles-era crimes can be launched.

== Criticism ==
=== Confidentiality ===
The Project faced criticism for mishandling confidentiality assurances, as the contracts may have misled participants about protections against subpoenas issued in the United States. Boston College signed an agreement with Moloney ensuring interviewee contracts guaranteed confidentiality "to the extent American law allows." O'Neill came to regret, however, that the participant contracts didn't specify that the secrecy of the archive may be limited under American law.

O'Neill was accused by Moloney of having lost donor forms, including Dolours Price’s, while O'Neill denied the claim, calling it "bizarre" and accusing Moloney of contractual violations.
