= Marian Price =

Former volunteer in the Provisional Irish Republican Army

- Born: 1954 (age 71–72); Belfast, Northern Ireland
- Occupations: Provisional IRA volunteer; political activist
- Spouse: Gerry McGlinchey
- Children: 2
- Relatives: Dolours Price (sister)
- Military career
- Paramilitary: Provisional IRA
- Unit: Belfast Brigade
- Conflicts: The Troubles: 1973 Old Bailey Bombing

Marian Price (born 1954), also known by her married name as Marian McGlinchey, is a former Provisional Irish Republican Army (Provisional IRA) volunteer.

Born into a Republican family in Belfast, Price joined the Provisional IRA in 1971, along with her sister Dolours Price. They both participated in the 1973 Old Bailey bombing, for which Marian Price was sentenced to two life terms. The sisters carried out a prolonged hunger strike at the start of their sentence. Marian Price was freed in 1980 on a Royal prerogative of mercy when anorexia nervosa, resulting from being force-fed on her hunger strike, was deemed to put her life at risk.

After her release she withdrew from public life, but in the 1990s she became a vocal opponent of Sinn Féin's "peace strategy."

In 2009 she was arrested in connection with the Massereene Barracks shooting. She was charged with providing property for the purposes of terrorism in 2011 and released in 2013.

== Early life ==
Price was born into a strongly Republican family in Andersonstown, west Belfast. Both of her parents had been imprisoned, her father for involvement with the Irish Republican Army and her mother as part of the Cumann na mBan. Their mother's sister, Bridie, who lived with them, had lost both hands and her eyesight at the age of 27 in an accident while moving explosives.

== Political activism and the IRA ==
Price and her sister Dolours participated in the Belfast to Derry civil rights march in January 1969 and were attacked in the Burntollet Bridge incident.

In 1971, together with Dolours, she joined the Provisional Irish Republican Army (Provisional IRA).

=== Old Bailey bombing ===
Price was jailed for her part in the Provisional IRA's London bombing campaign of 1973. She was part of a unit that placed four car bombs in London on 8 March 1973. The 1973 Old Bailey bombing and that of the Whitehall army recruitment centre saw 200 injured. A warning was issued an hour before the blast. One man died of a heart attack, although an autopsy found his heart attack had begun before the Old Bailey blast. She and her sister Dolours were apprehended along with Hugh Feeney, Gerry Kelly, and six others, as they were boarding a flight to Ireland. They were tried and convicted at the Great Hall in Winchester Castle on 14 November after two days of deliberation by the jury. Marian Price was sentenced to two life terms.

The Price sisters, along with Kelly and Feeney, immediately went on hunger strike in a campaign to be repatriated to a prison in Northern Ireland. IRA prisoners in Ireland at the time had Special Category Status (similar to political status), which was not granted to IRA prisoners in England, and the IRA volunteers did not see themselves as criminals but insisted to be treated like prisoners of war. The hunger strike lasted over 200 days, with the hunger strikers being force-fed by prison authorities for 167 of them.

In an interview with Suzanne Breen, Price described being force-fed:

Four male prison officers tie you into the chair so tightly with sheets you can't struggle. You clench your teeth to try to keep your mouth closed but they push a metal spring device around your jaw to prise it open. They force a wooden clamp with a hole in the middle into your mouth. Then, they insert a big rubber tube down that. They hold your head back. You can't move. They throw whatever they like into the food mixer – orange juice, soup, or cartons of cream if they want to beef up the calories. They take jugs of this gruel from the food mixer and pour it into a funnel attached to the tube. The force-feeding takes 15 minutes but it feels like forever. You're in control of nothing. You're terrified the food will go down the wrong way and you won't be able to let them know because you can't speak or move. You're frightened you'll choke to death.

=== Political activity after prison ===
Marian Price was freed in 1980 on a Royal prerogative of mercy when her anorexia nervosa, resulting from being force-fed during the hunger strike, was deemed to put her life at risk. She resumed a private life, emerging only in the 1990s as a vocal opponent of Sinn Féin's "peace strategy". Price has been critical of the Good Friday Agreement, saying "It is certainly not what I went to prison for, and it is not what my sister went to prison for".

Price was refused a visa to enter the United States on 15 December 1999. She had been due to speak at an Irish Freedom Committee fundraising event in New York. In 2000 Price gave the funeral oration for Joseph O'Connor, a member of the Real IRA. As of 2003 she was a member of the 32 County Sovereignty Movement and worked for a prisoners' welfare organisation. Interviewed in The Guardian in 2003 she expressed no regrets for her past actions and her continued support for armed struggle.

=== Return to prison ===
On 17 November 2009, she was named as being one of two people arrested in connection with an attack on the Massereene Barracks in Northern Ireland in March 2009, organized by the dissident republican group the Real IRA, in which two British soldiers were shot dead. In 2011 she was charged with providing property for the purposes of terrorism.

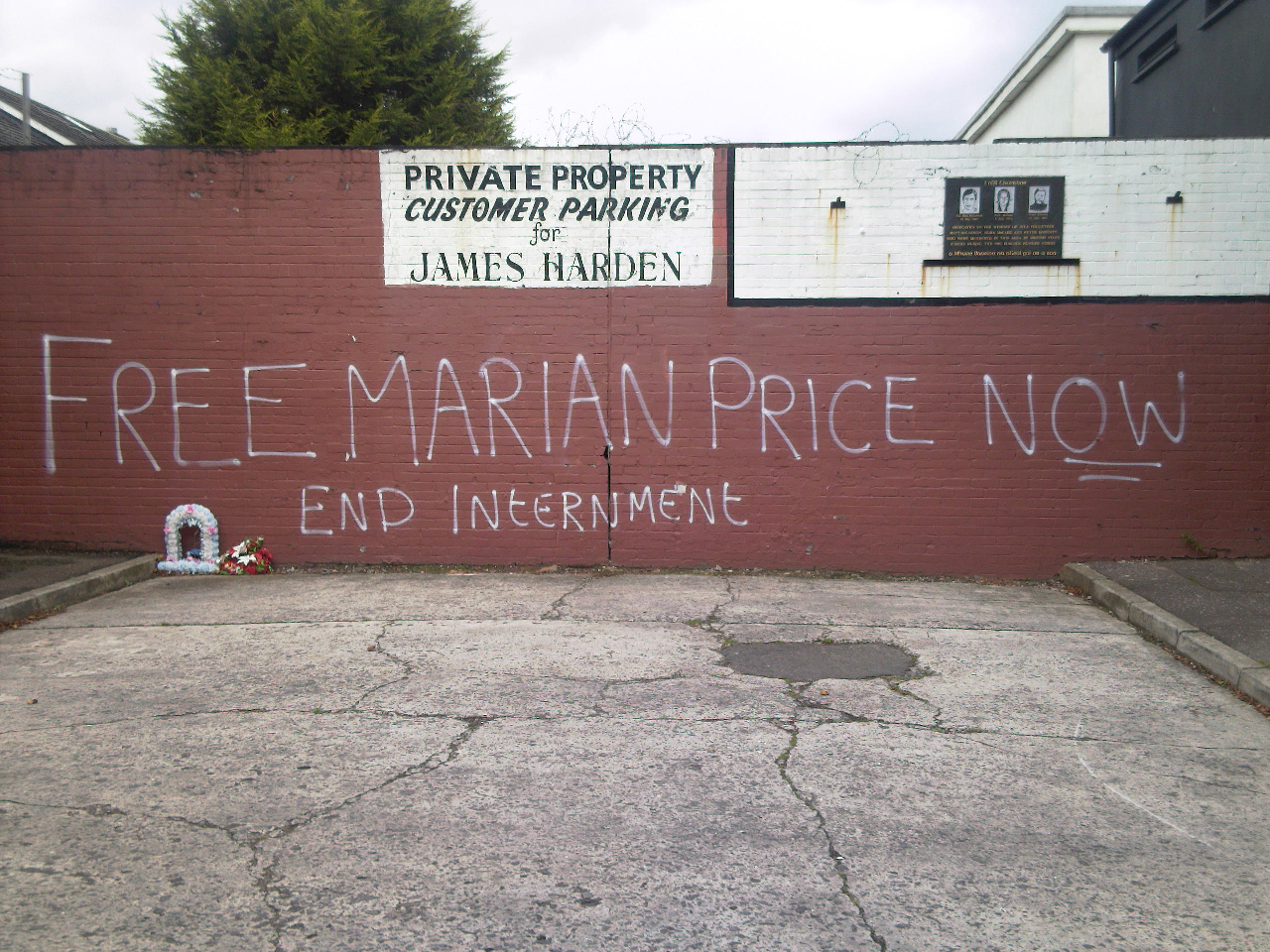
Graffiti supporting Price on the Falls Road, Belfast following her 2011 imprisonment

On 15 May 2011, she was charged with encouraging support for an illegal organisation. This related to her involvement in a statement given at an Easter Rising rally in Derry in 2011. On the same day the Secretary of State for Northern Ireland, Owen Paterson, revoked her release from prison on licence. Paterson said the decision was made because the threat posed by Price had "significantly increased".

Price was the only female inmate at HM Prison Maghaberry near Lisburn from May 2011 until she was moved to the hospital wing of HM Prison Hydebank Wood in February 2012. In May 2012, at a rally in her support, Price's husband, Gerry McGlinchey, stated that his wife was near breaking point. The charges against Price and three men from Derry in relation to the Easter Rising rally were later dismissed at Derry Magistrates' Court in May 2012.

On 7 June 2012, a protest close to Times Square in Manhattan, New York, called for Price to be released from what her family describes as internment. On 30 May 2013, Price was released from prison after a decision by the Parole Commissioners.

== In popular culture ==
Price was portrayed by Hazel Doupe and Helen Behan in the 2024 limited series, Say Nothing, which depicts the Provisional IRA in Belfast and The Disappeared during The Troubles. On 4 December 2024, Price announced, through her solicitor, that she would be taking legal action against Disney+ over the series depicting her killing Jean McConville. In response to the threatened lawsuit, Say Nothing author, journalist Patrick Radden Keefe, stood by his allegation that Marian Price murdered Jean McConville, saying, "I stand by my reporting. I’m quite transparent about my process of deduction in the book, so readers can decide for themselves whether they are persuaded." He would go on to note that before Dolours Price's death, she told multiple people that she witnessed Marian killing McConville. On 2 July 2025 Price filed a claim against Disney in the Dublin High Court seeking damages and the removal of the scene in the ninth episode that showed her shooting McConville.
