= Say Nothing (book) =

2018 book by Patrick Radden Keefe

Say Nothing: A True Story of Murder and Memory in Northern Ireland
- Cover of first edition
- Author: Patrick Radden Keefe
- Audio read by: Matthew Blaney
- Cover artist: Stefano Archetti (photo)
- Language: English
- Subject: The Troubles
- Publisher: William Collins
- Publication date: 1 November 2018
- Publication place: United Kingdom
- Media type: Print (hardcover)
- Pages: 513
- Awards: 2019 Orwell Prize for Political Writing
- ISBN: 9780008159252
- OCLC: 1063745342
- Dewey Decimal: 941.670824092
- LC Class: DA995.B5 K44 2018

Say Nothing: A True Story of Murder and Memory in Northern Ireland is a 2018 book by the American journalist Patrick Radden Keefe. It focuses on the 1972 abduction and murder of Jean McConville during the Troubles in Northern Ireland. It spent six weeks on The New York Times Best Seller list and received acclaim. It was adapted into a 2024 limited series for Hulu and Disney+.

== Summary ==
Say Nothing's subject is the Troubles in Northern Ireland, with the 1972 abduction and murder of Jean McConville as a central focus. The book describes the lives of Dolours Price, Marian Price, Brendan Hughes, Gerry Adams, and Jean McConville's children. Through these figures, it offers a history of the Troubles as a whole: the civil rights movement and the turn to violence at the end of the 1960s, the Provisional IRA's bombing campaign, the 1981 hunger strike, the peace process and the opposition it faced within the republican movement, and the post-conflict struggle to understand crimes like McConville's murder. The book also details the efforts of the Belfast Project to research and investigate the events of the conflict, which was led by Anthony McIntyre, Ed Moloney, and Robert Keating O'Neill at Boston College. Keefe began researching and writing the book after reading an obituary of Dolours Price in 2013.

The title is taken from the poem "Whatever You Say, Say Nothing" by Irish Nobel laureate Seamus Heaney from his collection North (1975).

== Publication ==
Say Nothing was first published by the William Collins imprint of HarperCollins on 1 November 2018. It was published in the US by Doubleday on 26 February 2019.

The book debuted at number five on The New York Times Combined Print & E-Book Nonfiction best-sellers list on 17 March 2019. It spent six weeks on the list. Say Nothing also debuted at number seven on The New York Times Hardcover Nonfiction best-sellers list on 17 March 2019, and spent six weeks on the list.

== Reception ==
Jennifer Szalai of The New York Times wrote, "Keefe's narrative is an architectural feat, expertly constructed out of complex and contentious material, arranged and balanced just so." Maureen Corrigan of NPR wrote, "Keefe is a storyteller who captures the complexities of a historical moment by digging deep into the lives of people on all sides of the conflict." Corrigan concludes, "At the end of his panoramic book, which gathers together history, politics and biography, Keefe tightens the focus back to the mystery of McConville's abduction and murder. And, as in the most ingenious crime stories, Keefe unveils a revelation — lying, so to speak, in plain sight — that only further complicates the moral dimensions of his tale."

Devlin Barrett of The Washington Post described how Say Nothing is "a cautionary tale, [that] speaks volumes — about the zealotry of youth, the long-term consequences of violence and the politics of forgetting." The Economist wrote, "The discerning skill with which Mr. Radden Keefe gets inside these characters' minds may unsettle some readers, but it is also his book's strength. He shows how people who in peacetime might just have been strong-willed or colourful types came to condone or perpetrate the unspeakable." Stephen Phillips of the Los Angeles Times wrote: "Say Nothing powerfully documents a society benumbed by trauma attempting to reckon with the abyss that engulfed it."

In May 2019, Irish journalist Ed Moloney, the director of the Belfast Project, published a piece in CounterPunch in which he alleged several inaccuracies in Keefe's book. He also criticised Keefe's decision to cite the book using endnotes, which a publishing industry source told Moloney "convey a more commercial narrative", instead of using Chicago Manual of Style footnotes. With Keefe not using footnotes, Moloney says: "The writing thus flows uninterrupted, appearing to the untutored reader – or reviewer – as being the work of the author when it may not be. It takes hard work and determination to discover how much of this book is truly original reporting and how much is taken from other people's work. A 'more commercial narrative' indeed."

=== Awards and honors ===
The book was named one of the top ten books of 2019 by both The New York Times Book Review and The Washington Post. It won the 2019 National Book Critics Circle Award for nonfiction. In 2024, it was listed #19 on The New York Times' 100 Best Books of the 21st Century list.

== Television adaptation ==
In February 2024, FX announced that they would be adapting the book into a limited series starring Lola Petticrew, Hazel Doupe, Anthony Boyle, Josh Finan and Maxine Peake. The series premiered on 14 November 2024.
