= Ivor Bell =

Irish Republican (born 1936/1937)

- Born: 1936/1937 (age 88–90); Belfast, Northern Ireland
- Military career
- Allegiance: Provisional Irish Republican Army
- Service years: 1956–1962; 1970–1985
- Rank: Volunteer; Adjutant; Chief of Staff
- Unit: Provisional IRA Belfast Brigade C-Company 2nd Battalion
- Conflict: The Troubles

Ivor Malachy Bell (born 1936/1937) is an Irish republican, and a former volunteer in the Belfast Brigade of the Provisional Irish Republican Army (IRA) who later became Chief of Staff on the Army Council.

Bell was the IRA's representative to Libya in the late 1970s and early 1980s. An opponent of the turn towards electoral politics spearheaded by Gerry Adams, he was forced out of the organization in 1985.

In 2014 Bell was arrested in connection with the 1972 murder of Jean McConville. He was acquitted in 2019.

== IRA career ==
Bell was involved with the Irish Republican Army during the 1956–1962 campaign, but left over the decision to call a cease-fire. He rejoined the republican movement in 1970, and become the commander of the Kashmir Road-based C Company of the Provisional IRA Belfast Brigade. During Gerry Adams' initial career in the republican movement he took much of his direction from Brendan Hughes and Bell. At this time Adams was Bell's adjutant in the Second Battalion of the Belfast Brigade. Hughes was the commander of the D Coy. Adams looked to Bell for political strategy and to Hughes for the opinion of the "rank and file" volunteers.

In 1972, Bell, now Belfast Brigade adjutant, along with Dáithí Ó Conaill, Seamus Twomey, Martin McGuinness, and Gerry Adams were flown to London by the Royal Air Force for secret ceasefire talks with British government ministers. Adams and Bell were sceptical about the proposed cease-fire and did not trust the British government. The truce soon broke down, followed by twenty deaths over three days.

== Escape from Long Kesh Detention Centre ==
In February 1974, Bell was arrested on information provided by one of the "Disappeared" (informer) Eamon Molloy. Bell was placed in Cage 11 at Long Kesh Detention Centre along with Hughes and Adams. Fellow internees had nicknamed it the 'General's Cage' because of the number of senior republicans held there.

On 15 April 1974, Bell escaped when he swapped places with a visitor and walked out of the prison. He was recaptured two weeks later at a flat in the affluent Malone Road area of south Belfast after Molloy had informed the security services of his whereabouts.

== Chief of Staff ==
In 1982, Martin McGuinness quit as Chief of Staff and Bell took over his position. Bell was arrested, on evidence provided by another supergrass, Robert "Beedo" Lean, in 1983. In line with IRA rules, contained within The Green Book, Bell lost his position as chief of staff, which was then taken by Kevin McKenna from the Tyrone Brigade.

Upon release Bell, and fellow prisoner Edward Carmichael, stated that they had both been offered immunity if they would incriminate Sinn Féin elected representatives Danny Morrison, Gerry Adams and Martin McGuinness. Carmichael had been offered £300,000 and Bell stated that he was told he could "name my own figure".

== Libyan connection ==
On release from prison in 1983, Bell was reappointed to the Army Council but did not regain his position as chief of staff. Much of his influence had been eroded.

Bell was the IRA's representative to Libya during the late 1970s and the early 1980s. Libya and the IRA had a common enemy, the British government. British Prime Minister Margaret Thatcher was heavily criticised in Libya for allowing US planes to take off from British air bases for raids on Libya in which more than seventy people were killed.

In late 1984 and early 1985 the Libyan Intelligence Service moved to put in place a supply of arms to the IRA in order that they could more effectively fight the British Army, and Bell and Joe Cahill were instrumental in putting in place the Libyan arms smuggling plan.

== Court martial ==
In 1984, Bell openly opposed Adams' proposal to increase spending on election campaigns instead of the war against Britain. Bell was a hard-line militarist who opposed the use of funds by Sinn Féin and resented moves to end abstentionism. Bell emerged as the head of a group, which included senior figures like Danny McCann. In June 1985, Bell was dismissed from the IRA.

== 2014 arrest and charge ==
Bell was arrested by the Police Service of Northern Ireland on 18 March 2014 for questioning in relation to the abduction and murder of Jean McConville in 1972. Bell was charged with aiding and abetting murder and membership of the IRA. He appeared in court on 22 March 2014 and was initially refused bail, though it was granted on 26 March. On 7 July 2016, it was announced that Bell would stand trial for McConville's murder. His lawyers had argued for the charges to be dropped, claiming a lack of evidence to support a trial.

The charges arose from the Boston College tapes that led the US Justice Department, acting on behalf of the UK Government, to issue a subpoena to Boston College for the tapes and transcripts of the Belfast Project.

His trial was postponed due to the claim by Bell's legal team that he suffered from dementia and would not be able to fully participate in the trial.

In October 2019, in a ruling of the Belfast Crown Court, Bell was cleared of involvement in the murder of Jean McConville. The Boston tapes were deemed unreliable and could not be presented as evidence in the trial. Adams was called as a defence witness.
