= Dolours Price =

PIRA volunteer (1950–2013)

- Price, c. 1973
- Born: 16 December 1950; Belfast, Northern Ireland
- Died: 23 January 2013 (aged 62); Malahide, County Dublin, Ireland
- Occupations: Provisional Irish Republican Army volunteer; political activist
- Spouse: Stephen Rea (m. 1983; div. 2003)
- Children: 2
- Relatives: Marian Price (sister)

Dolours Price (16 December 1950 – 23 January 2013) was a Provisional Irish Republican Army (IRA) volunteer. She grew up in an Irish republican family and joined the IRA in 1971. She was sent to jail for her role in the 1973 Old Bailey bombing and released in 1981. In her later life, Price was a vocal opponent of the Irish peace process, Sinn Féin and Gerry Adams.

She married actor Stephen Rea in 1983; they divorced in 2003.

== Early life and education ==
Dolours Price was born on 16 December 1950 in Belfast, Northern Ireland. She and her sister, Marian, also an IRA member, were the daughters of Albert Price, a prominent Irish republican and former IRA member from Belfast, and Christina (née Dolan), a member of Cumann na mBan. Both parents were imprisoned at different times. The name Dolours derives from the "dolours'" (sorrows) of the Virgin Mary; however, the family was not particularly religious.

Christina's sister Bridie Dolan was blinded and lost both hands in an accident handling IRA explosives, and lived with the family.

Dolours attended St Dominic's Grammar School on the Falls Road, a classmate of Mary Leneghan (later McAleese; later President of Ireland, 1997–2011). She then qualified as a trainee teacher at St Mary's College, Belfast, in 1968.

== Paramilitary activity ==
Both Dolours and her sister Marian Price became involved in Irish republicanism in the late 1960s. They participated in the Belfast to Derry civil rights march in January 1969 and were attacked in the Burntollet Bridge incident.

In 1971, together with Marian, she joined the Provisional Irish Republican Army (IRA). In 1972 she joined an elite group within the IRA called "The Unknowns," commanded by Pat McClure. The Unknowns were tasked with various secretive activities and transported several accused traitors across the border into the Republic of Ireland, where they were "disappeared". She later stated that she had driven Joe Lynskey across the border to face trial. In addition, she stated that she, Pat McClure, and a third Unknown were tasked with killing Jean McConville, with the third Unknown actually shooting her.

She led the car bombing attacks, known as the Old Bailey bombing, in London on 8 March 1973, which injured over 200 people and is believed to have contributed to the death of one person who suffered a fatal heart attack. The two sisters were arrested, along with Gerry Kelly, Hugh Feeney, and six others on the day of the bombing as they were boarding a flight to Ireland. They were tried and convicted at the Great Hall in Winchester Castle on 14 November 1973. Although originally sentenced to life imprisonment, which was to run concurrently for each criminal charge, their sentence was eventually reduced to 20 years. Both sisters immediately went on a hunger strike, demanding to be moved to a women's prison in Northern Ireland. The hunger strike lasted for 208 days because the women were force-fed by prison authorities for 165 days. This was done by holding their mouths open with callipers, while liquid nourishment was poured into a tube into their throats. After this process was stopped on 18 May 1974, the sisters continued their strike until 7 June. The International Medical Council later ruled the practice of force-feeding hunger strikers unethical.

On the back of the hunger-striking campaign, her father contested West Belfast at the UK General Election of February 1974, receiving 5,662 votes (11.9%).

The Price sisters, Gerry Kelly and Hugh Feeney were moved to Northern Ireland prisons in 1975 as a result of an IRA truce. In May 1980 both sisters received the Royal Prerogative of Mercy, and Dolours was freed on humanitarian grounds in 1981 (having served seven years), suffering from anorexia nervosa brought on by her experience of fasting and force-feeding. Price's health improved after her release but she struggled with disordered eating throughout the remainder of her life.

The Price sisters remained active politically. In the late 1990s, Price and her sister claimed that they had been threatened by their former colleagues in the IRA and Sinn Féin for publicly opposing the Good Friday Agreement (i.e. the cessation of the IRA's military campaign).

Price was a contributor to The Blanket, an online journal edited by former Provisional IRA member Anthony McIntyre, until it ceased publication in 2008. In her articles, she accused several former colleagues of betraying the cause of Irish republicanism.

== Personal life ==
After her release, in 1983 she married Irish actor Stephen Rea with whom she had two sons. They divorced in 2003.

== Later life ==
In 2001, Price was arrested in Dublin and charged with possession of stolen prescription pads and forged prescriptions. She plead guilty and was fined £200 and ordered to attend Alcoholics Anonymous meetings. In her later life she struggled with depression, PTSD, and alcohol and drug addiction.

In February 2010, it was reported by The Irish News that Price had offered help to the Independent Commission for the Location of Victims' Remains in locating graves of three men, Joe Lynskey, Seamus Wright, and Kevin McKee. The bodies of Wright and McKee were recovered from a single grave in County Meath in August 2015. It is unclear if Price played a role in their recovery. The remains of Lynskey have not been recovered to date.

== Allegations against Gerry Adams ==
In 2010, Price claimed Gerry Adams had been her officer commanding when she was active in the IRA. Adams, who has always denied being a member of the IRA, denied her allegation. Price admitted to taking part in the murder of Jean McConville as a part of IRA action in 1972. She claimed the murder of McConville, a mother of 10, was ordered by Adams when he was an IRA leader in West Belfast. Adams further denied this claim, stating that Price made these allegations because of her opposition to the IRA's abandonment of paramilitary warfare in favour of politics, which Adams had been a key figure in facilitating in 1994.

== Boston College tapes ==
Oral historians from Boston College's Belfast Project interviewed both Price and her fellow IRA paramilitary Brendan Hughes between 2001 and 2006. The two gave detailed interviews for the historical record of the activities in the IRA, which were recorded on condition that the content of the interviews was not to be released during their lifetimes. Prior to Price's death, in May 2011, the Police Service of Northern Ireland (PSNI) subpoenaed the material, possibly as part of an investigation into the disappearance of a number of people in Northern Ireland during the 1970s.

In June 2011, the college filed a motion to quash the subpoena. A spokesman for the college stated that "our position is that the premature release of the tapes could threaten the safety of the participants, the enterprise of oral history, and the ongoing peace and reconciliation process in Northern Ireland." In June 2011, US federal prosecutors asked a judge to require the college to release the tapes to comply with treaty obligations with the United Kingdom. On 6 July 2012, the United States Court of Appeals for the First Circuit agreed with the government's position that the subpoena should stand.

On 17 October 2012, the United States Supreme Court temporarily blocked the college from handing over the interview tapes. In January 2013 Price died, and in April 2013, the Supreme Court turned away an appeal that sought to keep the interviews from being supplied to the PSNI. The order left in place a lower court ruling that ordered Boston College to give the Justice Department portions of recorded interviews with Price. Federal officials wanted to forward the recordings to police investigating the murder of Jean McConville.

== Death ==
Price's grave in Milltown Cemetery, Belfast

On 24 January 2013, Price was found dead at her home in Malahide, County Dublin, the result of a toxic interaction between prescribed sedative and antidepressant medication. The inquest returned a verdict of death by misadventure. She was buried at Milltown Cemetery in West Belfast.

== In books and on screen ==
In 2018, the non-fiction book Say Nothing: A True Story of Murder and Memory in Northern Ireland by journalist Patrick Radden Keefe was published. Price's story and the disappearance of Jean McConville are central to the narrative. The book became a best-seller.

Price was the subject of the 2019 feature-length documentary film directed by Maurice Sweeney, called I, Dolours. The film drew extensively on her filmed interview with journalist Ed Moloney in 2010.

In the 2024 TV limited series Say Nothing, based on Keefe's book, Price is portrayed by Lola Petticrew and Maxine Peake.
