= Naomh Malachi GFC =

Louth-based Gaelic games club

Naomh Malachi
- Founded: 1966
- County: Louth
- Nickname: The Mals
- Colours: Red and White
- Grounds: Páirc Naomh Malachi, Courtbane, Hackballscross
- Coordinates: 54.04520°N 6.56422°W

Playing kits
Standard colours

Naomh Malachi GFC is a Gaelic Athletic Association (GAA) club that fields Gaelic football teams in competitions organized by Louth GAA. As of 2023, the club competes in the Louth Junior Championship and Division 3B of the county football Leagues. Kevin Carragher is the manager of the senior team.

== History ==
Founded in 1966, Naomh Malachi is located in the townland of Courtbane, part of Hackballscross, in an area of north Louth just a short distance from the border with County Armagh. In 2002, the club reached the Senior grade of Louth football for the first time when they won the county Intermediate Championship, defeating Geraldines in the final by 3–08 to 2–08.

The club also had a successful Ladies' Gaelic football team, which from its inception in the 1990s went on to win several Senior Championship titles.

== Honours ==
- Louth Intermediate Football Championship (3): 2002, 2006, 2009
- Louth Junior Football Championship (1): 1979
- Grogan Cup (3): 2000, 2002, 2005
- McGahon Cup (1): 1998
- Drogheda and Dundalk Dairies Shield (1): 1979
- Kevin Mullen Plate (2): 2015, 2016
- Louth Junior 2A Football Championship (1): 2008
- Louth Junior 2 Football League (Division 4D) (1): 2002
- Louth Minor Football League (1): ‡ 2019
- Louth Minor Football Championship (1): § 1977
- Louth Minor 'B' Football Championship (1): ‡ 2017

‡ Shared with Kilkerley Emmets

§ Shared with Kilkerley Emmets and Roche Emmets

== Inter-county players ==
Naomh Malachi players who have represented Louth at senior inter-county level include:

- Mark Gogarty
- Ronan McElroy
- Ronan Greene
- Kevin Rogers
