= Say Nothing (TV series) =

2024 series about the Troubles in Northern Ireland

- Genre: Historical drama
- Created by: Joshua Zetumer
- Based on: Say Nothing: A True Story of Murder and Memory in Northern Ireland by Patrick Radden Keefe
- Starring: Lola Petticrew; Hazel Doupe; Anthony Boyle; Josh Finan; Maxine Peake
- Country of origin: United States
- Original languages: English; Irish
- No. of episodes: 9

Production
- Executive producers: Edward McDonnell; Monica Levinson; Josh Zetumer; Michael Lennox; Nina Jacobson; Brad Simpson
- Producer: Clare Barron
- Production companies: Slingerland, Ludwig, and Rogers; Color Force; FXP

Original release
- Network: FX on Hulu
- Release: 14 November 2024

Say Nothing is a 2024 historical drama limited series created by Joshua Zetumer and produced by FX Productions. The series premiered on 14 November 2024, on FX on Hulu. It is an adaptation of the 2018 book by Patrick Radden Keefe and details four decades in Northern Ireland during The Troubles. Say Nothing received generally positive reviews from critics, and won a Peabody Award.

== Synopsis ==
The series follows the lives of people growing up in Belfast in the 1970s, 1980s and 1990s during the Troubles, as well as their involvement in the Provisional Irish Republican Army, and inquiries into the Disappeared and particularly the murder of Jean McConville. Interviews from the Belfast Project are woven into the narrative which also includes depictions of the 1973 Old Bailey bombing and the subsequent hunger strike by the Price sisters, Dolours and Marian.

== Cast ==
- Lola Petticrew as Dolours Price
  - Maxine Peake as older Dolours
- Hazel Doupe as Marian Price
  - Helen Behan as older Marian
- Anthony Boyle as Brendan Hughes
  - Tom Vaughan-Lawlor as older Brendan
- Josh Finan as Gerry Adams
  - Michael Colgan as older Gerry
- Seamus O'Hara as Mackers (Anthony McIntyre)
- Kerri Quinn as Crissie Price
- Stuart Graham as Albert Price
- Rory Kinnear as Frank Kitson
- Amy Molloy as Private Sarah Jane
- Frank Blake as Seamus Wright
- Emma Canning as Kathleen
- Adam Best as Joe Lynskey
- Martin McCann as Pat
- Emily Healy as Helen McConville
  - Laura Donnelly as older Helen
- Isaac Heslip as Archie McConville
- Judith Roddy as Jean McConville
- Damien Molony as Stephen Rea

== Episodes ==
No.	Title	Directed by	Written by	Original release date
1	"The Cause"	Michael Lennox	Joshua Zetumer	November 14, 2024
2	"Land of Password, Wink, and Nod"	Michael Lennox	Joshua Zetumer	November 14, 2024
3	"I'll Be Seeing You"	Mary Nighy	Clare Barron	November 14, 2024
4	"Tout"	Mary Nighy	Joe Murtagh	November 14, 2024
5	"Evil Little Maniacs"	Anthony Byrne	Story by : Joe Murtagh & Kirsten Sheridan & Joshua Zetumer; Teleplay by : Joe Murtagh	November 14, 2024
6	"Do No Harm"	Alice Seabright	Clare Barron	November 14, 2024
7	"Theater People"	Anthony Byrne	Clare Barron & Joshua Zetumer	November 14, 2024
8	"I Lay Waiting"	Michael Lennox	Story by : Kirsten Sheridan; Teleplay by : Kirsten Sheridan & Joshua Zetumer	November 14, 2024
9	"The People in the Dirt"	Michael Lennox	Joshua Zetumer	November 14, 2024

== Production ==
The production is an adaptation of the Patrick Radden Keefe best-selling book Say Nothing: A True Story of Murder and Memory in Northern Ireland, which detailed the abduction and murder of Jean McConville, a widow and mother of ten, against the backdrop of four decades during The Troubles in Northern Ireland.

Edward McDonnell, Monica Levinson, Joshua Zetumer, and Michael Lennox are executive producers with Zetumer also serving as showrunner and Lennox directing the nine-part series. Nina Jacobson and Brad Simpson's Color Force produced the series.

In February 2024, Lola Petticrew, Hazel Doupe, Anthony Boyle, Josh Finan, and Maxine Peake were confirmed as the lead cast. The cast also includes Michael Colgan, Kerri Quinn, Stuart Graham, Laura Donnelly, Rory Kinnear, Amy Molloy, Helen Behan, Damien Molony and Judith Roddy.

Filming took place in the Walton area of Liverpool in May 2023. Filming locations also include Belfast, London, Sheffield, and Shepton Mallet Prison, near Bath in Somerset in August and September 2023.

== Broadcast ==
The series was released internationally on 14 November 2024, on Disney+ in the UK and elsewhere and on Hulu in the United States.

The series portrays Gerry Adams as being a senior IRA commander. Adams has always denied any involvement in the IRA. Each episode contains an endnote stating "Gerry Adams has always denied being a member of the IRA or participating in any IRA-related violence." At the end of episodes 7 to 9 there is an additional disclaimer that "He further denies any involvement in the abduction of Jean McConville."

Episode 9 depicts Marian shooting Jean McConville. Marian Price has denied any involvement in the death of McConville. The episode contains an endnote stating "Marian Price also denies any involvement in the murder of Jean McConville." In December 2024, she initiated legal action against the makers of the show for the depiction.

== Reception ==
=== Critical response ===
Say Nothing received generally positive reviews from critics. It holds a 93% approval rating from 46 critics and an average rating of 8.5/10 on review aggregator Rotten Tomatoes. The critics consensus on the website states, "All the more powerful for its moral and political ambiguity, Say Nothing is a haunting depiction of The Troubles." On Metacritic, the series has a "generally favorable" reception based on a weighted average score of 80 out of 100 from 23 critics.

Benji Wilson of The Daily Telegraph gave Say Nothing a grade of five out of five, describing it as a powerful blend of history, tragedy, and thriller, effectively weaving together multiple narratives that span four decades of the Troubles in Northern Ireland. He praised the series for its compelling portrayal of key figures like Gerry Adams, Jean McConville, Dolours Price, and Brendan Hughes, noting their strong performances and well-developed storylines. Wilson acknowledged the challenge of adapting Patrick Radden Keefe's 2018 book but commended the show for capturing its essence. He pointed out that the series initially romanticizes the IRA but later shifts to a more profound reflection on the past, with the inclusion of interviews from the Belfast Tapes. He highlighted the theme of the need for reconciliation and the tension between silence and truth, particularly through the character of Gerry Adams.

Lucy Mangan of The Guardian rated Say Nothing three out of five, saying it could have easily become chaotic, given its multiple narratives and time shifts, but it maintains clarity by firmly grounding its characters and their stories in history. She praised the series for its gripping portrayal of the Troubles, particularly focusing on the abduction of Jean McConville and the story of Dolours Price, an IRA volunteer. Mangan highlighted the performances, especially from Maxine Peake as Dolours in later years and Lola Petticrew as her younger self. She said that while the series is emotionally engaging, it sometimes feels overly sympathetic to its main characters, particularly the Price sisters, Gerry Adams, and Brendan Hughes, and fails to fully address the consequences of their actions. Despite its darkening tone, Mangan felt that the show did not sufficiently reckon with the suffering caused by its protagonists.

=== Viewership ===
The streaming aggregator Reelgood, which tracks 20 million monthly viewing decisions across all streaming platforms in the US, calculated that Say Nothing was the seventh most-streamed series in the US from November 14—20. It moved to ninth place for the week ending November 27.

=== Reactions ===
McConville's son was critical of the adaptation, saying that "[u]sing what happened to our mother for entertainment is sickening. To make money out of her murder and the pain that has been in our lives ever since is cruel and obscene. I doubt they even think of us as real people." On 4 December 2024, Marian Price announced, through her solicitor, that she would be taking legal action against Disney+ over the series depicting her killing Jean McConville. On 2 July 2025 Price filed a claim against Disney in the Dublin High Court seeking damages and the removal of the scene in the ninth episode that showed her shooting McConville.

=== Accolades ===
Year	Award	Category	Nominee(s)	Result	Ref.
2025	British Academy Television Awards	Best International Programme	Say Nothing (Note: Nominees: Nina Jacobson, Patrick Radden Keefe, Michael Lennox, Monica Levinson, Brad Simpson, Joshua Zetumer)	Nominated	
2025	British Academy Television Awards	Best Actress	Lola Petticrew	Nominated	
2025	British Academy Television Awards	Best Supporting Actress	Maxine Peake	Nominated	
2025	British Academy Television Craft Awards	Best Photography & Lighting: Fiction	Stephen Murphy (for "I Lay Waiting")	Nominated	
2025	Casting Directors' Guild Awards	Best Casting in a TV Drama Series	Lucy Amos and Nina Gold	Nominated	
2025	Gotham Awards	Breakthrough Limited Series	Say Nothing (Note: Nominees: Nina Jacobson, Patrick Radden Keefe, Michael Lennox, Monica Levinson, Edward L. McDonnell, Brad Simpson, Joshua Zetumer)	Nominated	
2025	Gracie Awards	Limited Series	Say Nothing	Won	
2025	IFTA Film & Drama Awards	Best Drama	Say Nothing	Nominated	
2025	IFTA Film & Drama Awards	Best Lead Actor – Drama	Anthony Boyle	Nominated	
2025	IFTA Film & Drama Awards	Best Lead Actress – Drama	Lola Petticrew	Won	
2025	IFTA Film & Drama Awards	Best Supporting Actor – Drama	Tom Vaughan-Lawlor	Won	
2025	IFTA Film & Drama Awards	Best Supporting Actress – Drama	Hazel Doupe	Won	
2025	IFTA Film & Drama Awards	Best Director – Drama	Michael Lennox	Nominated	
2025	IFTA Film & Drama Awards	Best Script – Drama	Kirsten Sheridan and Joshua Zetumer	Nominated	
2025	IFTA Film & Drama Awards	Best Casting	Lucy Amos and Nina Gold	Nominated	
2025	IFTA Film & Drama Awards	Best Cinematography	Stephen Murphy	Nominated	
2025	IFTA Film & Drama Awards	Best Editing	Edel McDonnell	Nominated	
2025	IFTA Film & Drama Awards	Rising Star Award	Anthony Boyle	Won (Note: Anthony Boyle won the Rising Star Award for his performance in Masters of the Air, Manhunt, and Say Nothing.)	
2025	Peabody Awards	Entertainment	Say Nothing	Won	
2025	Primetime Emmy Awards	Outstanding Writing for a Limited or Anthology Series or Movie	Joshua Zetumer (for "The People in the Dirt")	Nominated	
2025	Television Critics Association Awards	Outstanding Achievement in Movies, Miniseries and Specials	Say Nothing	Nominated	
2025	USC Scripter Awards	Episodic Series	Patrick Radden Keefe and Joshua Zetumer (for "The People in the Dirt")	Won	
2025	Writers Guild of America Awards	Television: Limited Series	Clare Barron, Joe Murtagh, Kirsten Sheridan, and Joshua Zetumer	Nominated	
2026	Film Independent Spirit Awards	Best Lead Performance in a New Scripted Series	Lola Peticrew	Nominated	
