= Murder of Jean McConville =

Northern Irish murder case

Jean McConville
- Born: Jean Murray; 7 May 1934; Belfast, Northern Ireland
- Disappeared: 1 December 1972 (aged 38); County Louth, Republic of Ireland
- Cause of death: Murder by gunshot
- Known for: Being kidnapped and murdered by the Provisional Irish Republican Army
- Spouse: Arthur McConville
- Children: 10

In December 1972, Jean McConville, a 38‑year‑old mother of ten, was kidnapped from her home at Divis flats in Belfast, Northern Ireland by the Provisional Irish Republican Army (IRA). She was murdered and secretly buried in County Louth in the Republic of Ireland. The IRA accused her of passing information to British forces.

In 1999, the IRA acknowledged that it had killed McConville and eight others of the "Disappeared". It alleged she had been passing information about republicans to the British Army in exchange for money and that a transmitter had been found in her flat. A report by the Police Ombudsman found no evidence for this or other rumours.

Before the Troubles, the IRA had a policy of killing informers within its own ranks. From the start of the conflict, the term "informer" was also used for civilians who were suspected of providing information on paramilitary organisations to the security forces. Other Irish republican and loyalist paramilitaries also carried out such killings. As she was a recently widowed mother, the McConville killing was particularly controversial. Her body was not found until 2003 and the crime has not been solved. The Police Ombudsman found that the Royal Ulster Constabulary (RUC) did not begin to investigate the disappearance properly until 1995.

== Biography ==
Jean Murray was born on 7 May 1934 to a Protestant family in East Belfast. She converted after marrying Arthur McConville, a Catholic former British Army soldier, with whom she had ten children. After being intimidated out of a Protestant district by loyalists in 1969, the McConville family moved to West Belfast's Divis Flats in the Lower Falls Road. Arthur died from cancer in January 1972.

At the time of her death, McConville lived at 1A St Jude's Walk, part of the Divis Flats complex. This was an IRA stronghold from which attacks were regularly launched against the British Army and Royal Ulster Constabulary (RUC). Since the death of her husband, she had been raising their ten children, who were aged between six and 20. Their son Robbie was a member of the Official IRA and was interned in Long Kesh at the time of her death. He defected to the socialist Irish National Liberation Army in 1974.

=== Killing ===
In the months leading up to her death, tension and suspicion grew between McConville and her neighbours. One night shortly before her disappearance, she was allegedly attacked after leaving a bingo hall and warned to stop giving information to the British Army. According to police records, on 29 November 1972 a British Army unit found a distressed woman wandering in the street. She told them her name was McConville and that she had been attacked and warned to stop informing. One of McConville's children alleged she was kidnapped the night after this incident, but others gave the date of the kidnapping as 7 December.

On the night of her disappearance, four young women took McConville from her home at gunpoint, and she was driven to an unknown location. Dolours Price alleged she was one of those involved in driving her across the border. McConville was killed by a gunshot to the back of the head; there was no evidence of any other injuries to her body. She was 38. Her body was secretly buried across the border on Shelling Hill Beach (also known as Templetown Beach) at the south-eastern tip of the Cooley Peninsula in the north of County Louth, about 50 miles (80 km) from her home. The place of her death is uncertain.

Although no group admitted responsibility for her disappearance, there were rumours that the IRA had killed her for being an informer. The Guardian said she was killed because neighbours alleged they saw her helping a badly wounded soldier outside her home; her children say they recall her helping a wounded soldier some time before their father died in January 1972. In a 2014 interview published in the Sunday Life, former Irish republican Evelyn Gilroy alleged the person who had tended to the soldier was her [Gilroy's] sister. (Note: In an interview, Gilroy said: "My sister lived five doors from Jean McConville in Farset Walk in the flats. Weeks before Jean was killed, a soldier was hit on the head by a brick thrown by a local lad. My sister heard him crying. She was a very soft, warm woman and she brought him into the hallway and gave him a glass of water. "Her act of compassion didn't go down well with some. 'Touts Out' and 'Soldier Lover' was painted on her door. The incident was reported to the media. My sister gave an interview to Downtown Radio about her act of mercy and the intimidation that followed." — Evelyn Gilroy, quoted by Breen (2014). The Belfast Telegraph)

The IRA did not admit involvement until after the signing of the Good Friday Agreement. It alleged she was killed because she was passing information about republicans to the British Army. Former IRA member Brendan Hughes alleged the IRA had searched her flat some time before her death and found a radio transmitter, which they confiscated. He and other former republicans interrogated her and alleged she admitted the British Army was paying her for information about republicans. Hughes claims that, because of her circumstances, they let her go with a warning. However, he alleges when the IRA found she had resumed working for the British Army, it decided to "execute" her.

Usually the bodies of informers were left in public as a warning, but the IRA secretly buried McConville, apparently because she was a widowed mother of ten. The IRA had first done this type of secret burial two months earlier, when it killed and buried two IRA members who were alleged to be working undercover for the British Military Reaction Force.

=== Aftermath ===
After her disappearance, McConville's seven youngest children, including six-year-old twins, survived on their own in the flat, cared for by their 15-year-old sister Helen. According to them, the hungry family was visited three weeks later by a stranger, who gave them McConville's purse, with 52 pence and her three rings in it.

On 16 January 1973, the story of the abduction appeared on the front page of the Belfast Telegraph, under the headline "Snatched mother missing a month". The following day, the children were interviewed on the BBC television programme Scene Around Six. The children were reported to the social services and were immediately brought into local council care. The family was split up by social services. Among the consequences of the killing, McConville's son Billy was sent to De La Salle Brothers Boys' Home, Rubane House, Kircubbin, County Down, notorious for child abuse; he testified in 2014 to the Northern Ireland Historical Institutional Abuse Inquiry, describing repeated sexual and physical abuse, and starvation, saying "Christians looking after young boys – maybe they were Christians, but to me they were devils disguised in that uniform."

Within two days of her kidnapping, one of her sons reported the incident to the RUC and the British Army. However, the Police Ombudsman did not find any trace of an investigation into the kidnapping during the 1970s or 1980s. An officer told the Ombudsman that CID investigations in that area of Belfast at that time were "restricted to the most serious cases". On 2 January 1973, the RUC received two pieces of information stating: "it is rumoured that Jean McConville had been abducted by the [IRA] because she is an informer".

In March 1973, information was received from the British Army, saying the kidnapping was an elaborate hoax and that McConville had left of her own free will. As a result, the RUC refused to accept that McConville was missing, preferring to believe an anonymous tip that she had absconded with a British soldier. The first investigation into her kidnapping appears to have taken place in 1995, when a team of RUC detectives was established to review the cases of all those who were thought to have been kidnapped during the conflict, known as the Disappeared.

=== Search for remains ===
In 1999, the IRA gave information on the whereabouts of her body in the region of County Louth, at the south-eastern tip of the Cooley Peninsula, in the Republic of Ireland. This prompted a prolonged search, co-ordinated by the Garda Síochána, the Republic of Ireland's police force, but no body was found. On the night of 26 August 2003, a storm washed away part of the embankment supporting the west side of Shelling Hill Beach (also known as Templetown Beach) car park, near the site of previous searches. This exposed the body. On 27 August, it was found by a passersby while they were walking on Shelling Hill Beach. McConville's body was positively identified and subsequently reburied beside her husband Arthur in Holy Trinity Graveyard in Lisburn.

== Investigation ==
=== Police Ombudsman's report ===
In April 2004, the inquest into McConville's death returned a verdict of unlawful killing.

In 2006, the Police Ombudsman for Northern Ireland, Nuala O'Loan, published a report about the police's investigation of the murder. It concluded that the RUC did not investigate the murder until 1995, when it carried out a minor investigation. It found no evidence that she had been an informer, but recommended the British Government go against its long-standing policy regarding informers and reveal whether she was one. Journalist Ed Moloney called for the British Government to release war diaries relating to the Divis Flats area at the time. War diaries are usually released under the thirty-year rule, but those relating to Divis at the time of McConville's death are embargoed for almost ninety years.

The police have since apologised for its failure to investigate her abduction. In January 2005, Sinn Féin party chairman Mitchel McLaughlin alleged that the killing of McConville was not a crime, saying that she had been executed as a spy in a war situation. This prompted Irish journalist Fintan O'Toole to write a rebuttal, arguing that the abduction and extrajudicial killing of McConville was clearly a "war crime by all accepted national and international standards". The IRA has since issued a general apology, saying it "regrets the suffering of all the families whose loved ones were killed and buried by the IRA".

=== PSNI investigation and Boston College tapes ===
In August 2006, the Chief Constable of the Police Service of Northern Ireland (PSNI), Sir Hugh Orde, stated that he was not hopeful anyone would be brought to justice over the murder, saying "[in] any case of that age, it is highly unlikely that a successful prosecution could be mounted."

Boston College had launched an oral history project on the Troubles in 2001, called the Belfast Project. It recorded interviews with republicans and loyalists about their involvement in the conflict, on the understanding that the tapes would not be released until after their deaths. Two of the republican interviewees, Brendan Hughes and Dolours Price, both now deceased, admitted they were involved in McConville's kidnapping. Both became diehard opponents of the Good Friday Agreement and Sinn Féin's support of it. They saw Sinn Féin president Gerry Adams as a traitor for negotiating the agreement and persuading the IRA to end its campaign.

In 2010, after Hughes's death, some of his statements were published in the book Voices from the Grave. He alleged McConville had admitted being an informer, and that Adams ordered her disappearance. In a 2010 newspaper interview, Price also alleges Adams ordered her to participate in McConville's kidnapping. Price, who died in 2013, said she gave the interviews as revenge against Adams. Former republican prisoner Evelyn Gilroy, who lived near McConville, alleged Adams was an IRA commander and the only person who could have ordered the killing.

Adams has denied any role in the death of McConville. He said "the killing of Jean McConville and the secret burial of her body was wrong and a grievous injustice to her and her family".

In 2011, the PSNI began a legal bid to gain access to the tapes. Acting on a request from the PSNI, the United States Justice Department tried to force Boston College to hand them over. Boston College had promised those interviewed that the tapes would not be released until after their deaths, and other interviewees said they feared retribution if the tapes were released. Following a lengthy court battle during which Price died, the PSNI was given transcripts of interviews by Hughes and Price.

=== 2014 arrests ===
In March and April 2014, the PSNI arrested a number of people over the kidnapping and killing of McConville. Ivor Bell, former IRA Chief of Staff, was arrested in March 2014. Shortly afterwards, he was charged with aiding and abetting in her murder. In April, the PSNI arrested three people who were teenagers at the time of the kidnapping: a 56-year-old man and two women, aged 57 and 60. All were released without charge.

Following Bell's arrest in March, there was media speculation that police would want to question Gerry Adams due to the claims made by Hughes and Price. Adams maintained he was not involved, but had his solicitor contact the PSNI to find out whether they wanted to question him. On 30 April, after being contacted by the PSNI, Adams voluntarily arranged to be interviewed at Antrim PSNI Station. He was arrested and questioned for four days before being released without charge. A file was sent to the Public Prosecution Service (PPS) to decide whether further action should be taken, but there was "insufficient evidence" to charge him.

As the arrest took place during an election campaign, Sinn Féin alleged that the timing of Adams's arrest was politically motivated; an attempt to harm the party's chances in the upcoming elections. Alex Maskey said it was evidence of a "political agenda [...] a negative agenda" by elements of the PSNI.

McConville's family had campaigned for the arrest of Adams over the murder. Her son Michael said: "Me and the rest of my brothers and sisters are just glad to see the PSNI doing their job. We didn't think it would ever take place [Mr Adams' arrest], but we are quite glad that it is taking place." In a later interview on the Today programme on BBC Radio 4, Michael stated that he knew the names of those who had abducted and killed his mother, but that: "I wouldn't tell the police [PSNI]. If I told the police now a thing, me or one of my family members or one of my children would get shot by those [IRA] people. It's terrible that we know those people and we can't bring them to justice."

=== 2018 ===
Journalist Patrick Radden Keefe's 2018 book Say Nothing: A True Story of Murder and Memory in Northern Ireland focuses on the history of the Troubles starting from McConville's death. According to Keefe, Dolours Price told Ed Moloney and Anthony McIntyre that three IRA volunteers were present at McConville's killing: former Unknowns commander Pat McClure, Price herself, and a third volunteer. Price stated that it was the third, unidentified volunteer who fired the fatal shot, although Moloney and McIntyre refused to tell Keefe who this person was, as the volunteer was still alive at the time. Keefe concludes the third volunteer, and shooter, was Dolours's sister Marian Price, based on context clues from Brendan Hughes's interview, as well as confirmation he states he had from another source that both Price sisters were present at the shooting. Marian Price refused to be interviewed for Keefe's book, and her solicitor Peter Corrigan issued a statement denying the allegation.

=== 2024 ===
Say Nothing was released on Hulu and Disney+ on 14 November 2024. McConville was portrayed by Judith Roddy. Michael McConville said that "The portrayal of the execution and secret burial of my mother is horrendous and unless you have lived through it, you will never understand just how cruel it is", that it was "another telling of [my mother's story] that I and my family have to endure" and that "I have not watched it nor do I intend watching it." On 4 December 2024, Marian Price announced, through her solicitor, that she would be taking legal action against Disney+ over the series depicting her killing McConville. In an interview in December 2024, Keefe stood by his allegation that Marian Price had killed McConville, but stated that it was unlikely that she would be prosecuted because all of the witnesses had died.

=== 2025 ===
On 2 July 2025, Marian Price filed a claim against Disney in the Dublin High Court seeking damages and the removal of the scene in the ninth episode of Say Nothing that showed her shooting McConville.

== See also ==
- Gerard Evans
- Columba McVeigh
- Thomas Murphy
- Robert Nairac
- Murder of Gareth O'Connor
- Murder of Thomas Oliver
- Disappearance of Peter Wilson
- Enforced disappearance
- Independent Commission for the Location of Victims' Remains
- Internal Security Unit
