= Independent Commission for the Location of Victims' Remains =

Commission to locate abducted bodies

The Independent Commission for the Location of Victims' Remains (ICLVR) was established by treaty between the United Kingdom Government and the Government of Ireland, made on 27 April 1999 in connection with the affairs of Northern Ireland, in order to locate 16 missing Irish and British people presumed murdered during The Troubles.

The 16, referred to colloquially as "The Disappeared", were separately abducted, killed and buried in Ireland and France over the last 35 years, mainly in the 1970s. It is believed that they were abducted and killed by Irish Republican paramilitaries, mostly the Provisional Irish Republican Army, which denied involvement for years. All 16 individuals were Catholics and most were suspected of collaborating with the British or betraying the paramilitaries in some way. The Commission was established to locate the remains of these people. As of June 2017, the remains of 13 of the 16 disappeared have been located.

== Powers and functions ==
Its functions include receiving information as to the whereabouts of the remains of a victim of violence and disclosing such information for the purpose of facilitating the location of the remains to which the information relates.

- The remit and powers of the Commission are defined by the Northern Ireland (Location of Victims' Remains) Act 1999, which came into force on 26 May 1999; the Republic of Ireland has passed similar legislation: the Criminal Justice (Location of Victims' Remains) Act, 1999.
- A "victim of violence" is defined as a person killed before 10 April 1998 (the date of the Belfast Agreement) as a result of an unlawful act of violence committed on behalf of, or in connection with, a proscribed organisation. These organisations are those proscribed by the Northern Ireland (Emergency Provisions) Act 1996.
- Any evidence obtained (directly or indirectly) by the Commission is inadmissible in evidence in any criminal proceedings.
- Any remains discovered by the work of the commission are not allowed to undergo forensic testing other than for the purposes of an inquest to establish the identity of a deceased person or how, when, and where they died.
- All information provided to the commission will remain secret with only the family being informed that information has been received and the place where, according to the information, the victim's remains may be found.
- The commission has the power of entry enforceable by warrant to search anywhere in Northern Ireland.

== Victims ==
The people named by the ICLVR as having been killed and buried in undisclosed locations are:

- Seamus Wright (a member of the IRA accused of being a British Army agent) (1972) (remains found summer 2015)
- Kevin McKee (a member of the IRA accused of being a British Army agent) (1972) (corpse recovered 2015)
- Jean McConville (civilian accused of being a British spy) (1972) (corpse recovered August 2003)
- Joseph Lynskey (a member of the IRA accused of breaching IRA orders) (1972)
- Peter Wilson (no reason given) (1973) (corpse recovered November 2010)
- Eamon Molloy (a member of the IRA accused of being a British Army agent) (1975) (corpse recovered 1999)
- Columba McVeigh (civilian accused of being a British spy) (1975)
- Robert Nairac GC (British Army Officer and alleged member of the SAS) (1977)
- Brendan Megraw (civilian accused of being a British spy) (1978) (Corpse recovered 2014)
- John McClory (accused of stealing IRA weapons to use in robberies) (1978) (corpse recovered June 1999)
- Brian McKinney (accused of stealing IRA weapons to use in robberies) (1978) (corpse recovered June 1999)
- Danny McIlhone (accused of stealing IRA weapons) (1978) (corpse recovered November 2008)
- Gerard Evans (civilian accused of being a British Informant, IRA never officially admitted to have killed him) (1979) (corpse recovered October 2010)
- Charlie Armstrong (civilian, IRA never officially admitted to have killed him) (1981) (corpse recovered July 2010)
- Eugene Simons/Simmons (New Year's Day 1981) (corpse recovered May 1984 prior to the establishment of the Commission)
- Seamus Ruddy (ex-member of IRSP/ INLA, killed over arms supplies, by INLA) (1985)

== Remains recovered ==
As part of the peace process, the IRA passed information on the location of six graves containing eight bodies to the Commission. Using this information the bodies of John McClory and Brian McKinney were recovered on 29 June 1999 in County Monaghan. The body of Eamon Molloy had been left in a graveyard in Dundalk the previous month.

Jean McConville was discovered by accident on Shelling Hill beach near Carlingford in County Louth in August 2003. The IRA had previously said that Templeton beach, a short distance away, was the place of burial.

The remains of Danny McIlhone were discovered near Ballynultagh in the Wicklow Mountains in November 2008 and formally identified using DNA analysis the following month. There had been previous unsuccessful attempts to find McIlhone's remains in 1999 and 2000.

In 2010, the remains of Peter Wilson, Gerry Evans and Charlie Armstrong were exhumed, meaning that nine of the 16 disappeared had been recovered.

== Commissioners ==
The current commissioners are Sir Kenneth Bloomfield, former head of the Northern Ireland Civil Service and former Northern Ireland Victims Commissioner, and Mr Frank Murray, former Secretary to the Government (Cabinet Secretary) and former Chairman of the Irish Public Appointments Service, who took over from John Wilson. The appointment of Rosalie Flanagan as the new Commissioner was announced on 13 January 2021.

== See also ==
- Forced disappearance
- Disappeared (Northern Ireland)
