= Anthony McIntyre =

IRA volunteer and writer (born 1957)

- Born: 1957
- Military career
- Allegiance: Irish republicanism
- Branch: Provisional Irish Republican Army
- Rank: Volunteer
- Nickname: Mackers
- Other work: Writer, historian

Anthony McIntyre (born 1957) is a former Provisional Irish Republican Army (IRA) volunteer, writer and historian.

== Early life and career ==
On 27 February 1976, the IRA targeted Victor’s Bar in Belfast, identifying its doorman Kenneth Lenaghan as an Ulster Volunteer Force (UVF) member. That evening a hijacked car pulled up to the curb and McIntyre, later convicted of being the triggerman, fired gunshots into the crowd, killing Lenaghan. He was imprisoned for 18 years, reportedly laughing as the sentencing was being read out. McIntyre served his term in Long Kesh, spending four of those years on the no-wash protest.

After his release from prison in 1992, he completed a PhD in political science at Queen's University Belfast, and left the republican movement in 1998 to work as a journalist and researcher. Reflecting on his past, McIntyre stated in a 2023 interview: “I don’t have personal regrets — but I don’t think it had to happen, either”. A collection of his journalism was published as a book in 2008, Good Friday: The Death of Irish Republicanism.

== Research and the Belfast Project ==
McIntyre was involved with an oral history project at Boston College on the Troubles titled the Belfast Project, conducting interviews with former Provisional IRA members who (like himself) had become disillusioned with the direction the republican movement had taken, such as Brendan Hughes and Dolours Price. East Belfast resident with strong loyalist ties Wilson McArthur conducted a parallel set of interviews in the loyalist community. These interviews were the basis for the book Voices From The Grave: Two Men's War in Ireland by Ed Moloney, the Belfast Project's director.

In 2011, McIntyre became embroiled in controversy when transcripts of the interviews, held by Boston College, were subpoenaed by the Police Service of Northern Ireland (PSNI) in relation to an investigation of the 1972 abduction and killing of Jean McConville. In March 2014, the PSNI announced that it was seeking to question McIntyre over newly released Belfast Project recordings, specifically in reference to the alleged role of Gerry Adams in the kidnapping and murder of Jean McConville.

McIntyre had himself contributed a recorded interview to the Belfast Project, which were subsequently subpoenaed by the PSNI in 2018; in April 2024, the courts ultimately ruled in favor of the PSNI accessing the tapes, only five days before the cut-off date of May 1, 2024 set by the 2023 Troubles Legacy Act, after which point all active historical investigations and no further inquests into Troubles-era crimes can be launched.

== Political speech ==
McIntyre is a prominent critic of modern-day Sinn Féin and its leadership. McIntyre has spoken at Republican Sinn Féin party events. He is a co-founder of The Blanket, a journal which casts a critical eye on the Northern Ireland peace process. He is a publisher of The Pensive Quill, a website.

== Fictional depictions ==
McIntyre was played by Seamus O'Hara in the 2024 TV series Say Nothing.
