= A Secret History of the IRA =

2002 book by Ed Moloney

- Author: Ed Moloney
- Language: English
- Publisher: Penguin Books
- Publication date: 30 September 2002
- ISBN: 978-0393051940

A Secret History of the IRA is a book by journalist Ed Moloney, first published by Penguin Books in 2002.

== Content ==
The book tells the inside story of the IRA: its inner workings, secret meetings, dangerous informants, bombers and gunmen, and the rivalries and betrayals that tore it apart. The protagonist in the book is Gerry Adams, an early IRA leader in Belfast, and his unrelenting rise to power. The book asks: how could a man who condoned terrible atrocities also be the guiding force behind the ceasefire and peace process?

== Reviews ==
Reviewers responded favorably. In The Blanket, an online journal, reviewer Liam O Ruairc described the book as potentially “the standard if not the definitive work on the history of the Provisional IRA”. Eamonn McCann, in The Nation, commented that it was “the best book yet” written on the Provisional IRA as it traced the rise of the Provos from the burning out of Catholic neighborhoods in Belfast in August 1969 to “the enclosure of the movement's leadership within conventional bourgeois politics through the Good Friday Agreement of 1998” (Belfast Agreement).

A central theme in the book is the role that Sinn Féin President Gerry Adams has played in the Irish republican movement. In his review, O Ruairc noted that the book could have been “better titled A Secret History of Gerry Adams”. In The Sunday Business Post Online, reviewer Tom McGurk, in reference to the strategy articulated by Danny Morrison at the 1981 Sinn Féin Ard-Fheis, wrote that the book “grippingly” detailed Adams's struggle to move from the Armalite to the ballot box “without a split and without bodies in ditches”.

The book was met with controversy because of some of the revelations it contains. Those revelations reveal both a strength and weakness, in that some of Moloney's sources were willing to speak in great detail but with the caveat that they remain confidential. Adams portrayal as a calculating monster who subverted and sold out the movement has also been criticized to be lacking in serious analysis as to why his critics, who were in majority, were unable to stop him from pursuing the ceasefire.
