= Disappearance of Lisa Dorrian =

2005 Northern Irish missing-person case

Lisa Dorrian
- Dorrian c. 2004
- Born: 12 June 1979; Bangor, County Down, Northern Ireland
- Disappeared: 28 February 2005 (aged 25); Ballyhalbert, County Down, Northern Ireland
- Status: Missing for 21 years, 8 months and 12 days

On 28 February 2005, Lisa Dorrian, a 25‑year‑old Northern Irish woman, disappeared after the last confirmed sighting of her in the early hours of that morning. Despite nearly a dozen suspects being arrested and questioned, along with hundreds of potential witnesses interviewed and thousands of lines of inquiry examined, no one has ever been charged in connection with her disappearance.

More than 400 land, sea, and air searches have been carried out, including several potential crime scenes examined by forensic teams, but no trace of Dorrian has been found and police inquiries have continued to the present day. She is officially considered missing, presumed dead, and the authorities believe she was murdered soon after she was last seen alive.

== Background ==
Born in 1979, Lisa Dorrian was living in Bangor, County Down, and working as a shop assistant at the time of her disappearance. In the summer of 2004, she ended a four‑year relationship with her boyfriend, Jamie Mills, and began spending time with a new group of acquaintances whom her family alleged were heavy drug users with links to organised crime. During this period, she started using ecstasy and amphetamines on a regular basis, substances that were purportedly sourced from Loyalist paramilitaries. She had planned to move to Spain and establish a jet-ski rental business using £50,000 in personal-injury compensation she was due to receive in mid-2005.

1 Groomsport
2 Ballywalter
3 Kircubbin
4 Portavogie
5 Ballyhalbert

On the weekend of her disappearance, Dorrian spent the Friday night socialising in Groomsport before going to a friend's house in Ballywalter. The following afternoon, she visited a pub near Kircubbin and later travelled to a party in Ballyhalbert. That evening, she returned to her flat in Bangor for several hours, before going to the home of Naomi Drysdale in Ballyhalbert for another gathering. Later that day, after first visiting an off-licence in Portavogie, Dorrian then went to the deserted Ballyhalbert Caravan Park for an after-party on Sunday, 27 February 2005. At the time, she was dressed in a white tee-shirt, cream-coloured tracksuit bottoms and white furry "moon" boots.

Approximately a dozen people were present at the after‑party, including Mark Lovett, the 17‑year‑old groundsman of the caravan park. As the night progressed, attendees gradually left until only Dorrian and Lovett remained in the caravan at around 10 pm. Witnesses later described both as being under the influence of recreational drugs.

== Missing person investigation ==
On the evening of Tuesday, 1 March 2005, Dorrian's younger sister, Joanne, received a phone call from Lisa's flat mate informing her that Dorrian had not returned home since before the weekend. Joanne became concerned for her welfare after she attempted to contact her and the calls went unanswered. When the Dorrian family met with Lovett later that night, they described him as being in an emotionally distressed and tearful state.

Lovett told the police that he and Dorrian had seen flashing lights and heard loud noises outside the caravan at around 4:45 am on 28 February, the morning she disappeared. He stated that they left the caravan and ran away in fear. As it was out of season, the caravan park's street lights were switched off, and Lovett claimed he lost sight of her while running through the darkness. He asserted that he did not know where Dorrian went after they became separated; and when he called her mobile phone, it was answered by her former boyfriend, Stevie Thompson. Over the following days, PSNI officers searched along the Ards Peninsula, while divers examined underwater areas along the coastline.

On 10 March 2005, after finding no trace of Dorrian or any evidence to suggest she was still alive, the PSNI escalated the missing‑persons case to a murder investigation. Joanne later remarked that detectives encountered a "wall of silence" during their enquiries, and that none of the dozen or so people who had attended the party with her voluntarily provided information to the PSNI or approached the family with messages of sympathy.

== Murder investigation ==
Detectives working on the case identified and questioned all of the other caravan owners who had been on site on the night Dorrian disappeared, but none recalled hearing loud noises or seeing flashing lights early on the morning of 28 February. Police interviews with Thompson also revealed that Dorrian had returned a mobile phone he had bought for her when they ended their relationship a few days before she went missing. Thompson told detectives that when he answered a 5 am call from Lovett on that phone, he was at a flat in Ballywalter with two other people, and that although Lovett enquired about Dorrian's whereabouts, he did not sound distressed or panicked during their conversation.

=== 2000s ===
On 10 March 2005, two men were arrested by the PSNI in County Antrim in connection with Dorrian's murder, but were released without charge after 24 hours of questioning. On 14 June 2005, an 18-year-old man was arrested in the Greater Belfast area for questioning regarding the murder. On 11 August 2005, a 22-year-old man was arrested in relation to the case. Three men, two aged 18 and one aged 23, were arrested on 20 February 2006 in connection with the murder.

A few days later, at a news conference in Bangor on 22 February 2006, Detective Superintendent George Hamilton announced that the PSNI believed Dorrian's body may have been dumped at sea between late June and early August 2005, having first been stored somewhere on land. Police appealed for information about a 17‑foot orange or red boat that may have been used in the disposal of her remains.

=== 2010s ===
On 16 October 2012, the PSNI conducted a search in Comber for evidence relating to her disappearance, specifically for a vehicle that might have been used in connection with her murder. On 15 February 2016, officers began searching an area of farmland outside Comber for the body after receiving new information. Cadaver dogs were deployed, and officers carried out physical searches of the undergrowth for human remains.

On 28 June 2018, the PSNI searched wooded areas in Craigantlet and Carrickfergus using specially trained sniffer dogs in the hope of locating the body. These searches were not prompted by specific intelligence; instead, data from the case had been entered into a specialist UK police database that used analytic algorithms to estimate how far a perpetrator might have travelled to dispose of a body. Detectives stated that they believed her remains were disposed of relatively quickly and with minimal planning after the murder.

On 2 April 2019, after receiving fresh information, the PSNI launched a new search at the Ballyhalbert caravan park where Dorrian was last seen alive. Police focused on a derelict Second World War‑era airfield, RAF Ballyhalbert, adjacent to the site, using ground-penetrating radar to examine underground tunnels and buildings. On 5 April 2019, a 49-year-old man and a 34-year-old woman were arrested in the Newtownards area for questioning regarding the murder, but were released on bail after 24 hours. According to the Belfast Telegraph, the man was a former member of staff at the caravan park, to whom Lovett had allegedly run screaming for help at around 4:45 am on the morning of Dorrian's disappearance. The same newspaper reported that 34‑year‑old Naomi Drysdale was also arrested for questioning in 2019 before being released without charge.

=== 2020s ===
On 4 May 2021, the PSNI launched a further search for the body in an area known as the Clay Pits near Ballyhalbert. Although the lakes and ponds had been examined previously when Dorrian was still considered a missing person, the new searches involved police divers conducting fingertip examinations of the lakebeds.

On 27 February 2025, the PSNI released CCTV footage showing Dorrian visiting the Saltwater Brig gastro pub a few miles from Kircubbin shortly after 1 pm on 26 February 2005, in the hope that the last known images of her would prompt potential witnesses along the Ards Peninsula to come forward. The press release also included still images of her outside the Lock & Quay pub in Groomsport shortly before 11 pm the previous evening. On the same day, the independent charity Crimestoppers announced a £20,000 reward for information leading to the conviction of her murderer or the recovery of her remains. On 28 February 2025, the 20th anniversary of her disappearance, Joanne stated that six people had come forward with new information in the previous 24 hours, which had been passed to the authorities. She thanked those who had contacted the family and appealed for anyone else with relevant information to assist the investigation.

On 8 December 2025, the PSNI's Major Investigation Team announced that a 68‑year‑old man had been arrested on suspicion of murder and related offences, including assisting offenders, withholding information, and preventing a lawful burial. He was released without charge later the same day. Media reports later identified him as a prisoner serving a lengthy sentence for violent crime in HM Prison Maghaberry.

On 25 February 2026, PSNI detectives investigating the murder arrested a 40‑year‑old woman in Bangor and a 42‑year‑old man in Scotland on suspicion of murder, assisting offenders, withholding information, and preventing a lawful burial. Both individuals were released on bail the following day pending further inquiries. Media reports later identified the woman as the former girlfriend of a convicted drug dealer who had been in Dorrian's close company around the time of her disappearance, and identified the man as a violent career criminal with previous convictions for cocaine dealing, assault, and possession of an offensive weapon. On 4 March, detectives made a further arrest of a 40‑year‑old man in Millisle on suspicion of assisting offenders and withholding information. He was released on bail later that day pending further inquiries. On 5 March, detectives arrested a 48‑year‑old man in the Craigavon area on suspicion of murder, assisting offenders and preventing a lawful burial. The man was later released unconditionally from police custody. In response to the arrests, Dorrian's sister Joanne told Belfast Live that someone had approached her in 2025 with "significant information" about what happened on the night Dorrian disappeared. She said the information was subsequently passed to the PSNI.

== Media coverage and speculation ==
In the summer of 2005, reports began to appear in the media suggesting that individuals involved in local drug trafficking were connected in some way to Dorrian's disappearance. In May 2005, a newspaper claimed that the chief suspects in her murder were two brothers who were alleged to be involved in drug dealing in east Belfast. Also in May, BBC News reported allegations that Dorrian had previously been harassed by two men to whom she owed money for drugs, and that she had been storing £20,000 in cash on behalf of another individual at her flat in Bangor. In July 2005, The Herald published claims that Dorrian had stolen £200 worth of amphetamine powder from a drug dealer's stash in Ballywalter on the day she disappeared.

In July 2005, The Guardian reported an allegation that, after stepping outside to take a phone call, Dorrian had been lured from the caravan party to a house in Ballyhalbert at around 5 am on the morning she disappeared. Once inside, she was said to have been interrogated by two men about missing drugs and money, and subjected to a physical assault. According to the report, she was then driven against her will to a house in Holywood, where a further punishment beating allegedly resulted in her death. The men were then said to have disposed of her body in a forest in north County Down.

In August 2005, PSNI officers searched a boat near Portaferry belonging to 22‑year‑old Mark Smyth after receiving information that Dorrian's body might have been dumped at sea. On board, officers recovered 1,200 ecstasy tablets, cannabis, and half a kilogram of amphetamine powder. At a subsequent hearing at Belfast High Court, it was stated that the haul had an estimated street value of £30,000, and that another drugs seizure in south Belfast worth £17,000 bore Smyth's fingerprints on the packaging. Smyth, who had previously admitted giving Dorrian a lift to Ballyhalbert the day before she disappeared and who some media outlets described as a main person of interest in the case, was later sentenced to four years in prison after admitting possession of a controlled drug with intent to supply. In February 2006, graffiti naming Smyth as Dorrian's killer appeared around Belfast. Smyth consistently denied involvement, asserting that mobile-phone forensics placed him in Bangor on the night in question, and in 2014 he undertook a voluntary lie-detector test in an effort to prove his innocence.

Although he had been questioned by police in relation to the murder, Smyth was officially ruled out as a suspect by the PSNI in the years that followed. His younger brother, 17-year-old Adam Smyth, who in 2007 was sentenced to 20 years in prison for attempted murder following an unprovoked stabbing, had also been arrested on suspicion of Dorrian's murder and later released without charge. According to media reports, other members of Smyth's friendship group who were initially questioned as suspects but subsequently cleared included 21‑year‑old Marty Peacock and 26‑year‑old Stevie Thompson, who was Dorrian's former boyfriend from whom she had allegedly stolen drugs.

In a 2015, newspaper interview conducted at Maghaberry Prison, convicted murderer Jimmy Seales claimed that Dorrian had been killed at the Ballyhalbert caravan site by drug dealers to whom she owed £20,000. Seales further alleged that he had unwittingly bought the car used to transport her body a few days later, and that the PSNI subsequently seized the vehicle from his scrapyard in Comber as potential evidence. He also stated that police had searched land belonging to him near Comber in 2012 in connection with the disappearance. According to Seales, he was later told that Dorrian's body had been placed in a 40‑gallon oil drum, welded shut, and buried at an illegal landfill near Ballygowan.

In 2017, it emerged that Lovett, the last confirmed person to see Dorrian alive, had previously been arrested on suspicion of her murder but released without charge after denying involvement. He had since refused to engage with investigators. A witness who had attended the caravan party told police that Dorrian and Lovett had been "hallucinating" when he left, and that he later phoned Lovett at around 1:15 am to check on their welfare. According to the witness, Lovett rambled incoherently and made a remark about "seeing things" before abruptly ending the call.

A Belfast Telegraph report in February 2019 stated that detectives, who did not believe the murder to have been pre‑planned, now suspected that Dorrian's panicked killer had summoned his father to the caravan park to help dispose of her body. The report suggested that the pair placed her remains in the boot of a car and drove to a nearby location to bury her secretly. Detectives were said to have reached this conclusion because the killer and his accomplice had not informed on each other in the intervening years, indicating a close family connection.

In March 2022, the BBC documentary series Murder in the Badlands, which examined the unsolved murders of four women in Northern Ireland over the previous four decades, featured Dorrian's case in its first episode.

== Alleged Loyalist paramilitary involvement ==
In the days following Dorrian's disappearance, graffiti appeared around Ballyhalbert accusing the Loyalist Volunteer Force of involvement in her murder, and media reports claimed that the chief suspects were two LVF‑linked drug dealers from east Belfast. In a 2005 interview with the Belfast Telegraph, an LVF representative denied any connection to the case and urged anyone with information to contact the PSNI. The unnamed member added that the graffiti was an attempt to divert attention away from those actually responsible.

In 2019, a newspaper report alleged that the father of Dorrian's killer had been a former member of the Red Hand Commando who later joined the Mount Vernon UVF, and that both men had family connections to a senior Ulster Volunteer Force figure from the Rathcoole area. The same outlet further claimed that influential individuals within these organisations were protecting the killer and his father by threatening potential witnesses. A similar report in the Irish Independent stated that there was a widespread belief that senior Loyalists were involved in a cover‑up and had warned people with information not to speak to the PSNI. In October 2020, it was reported that a high‑ranking UVF member alleged to have shielded the suspects had recently been removed from his leadership position during a "purge", raising hopes of progress in locating Dorrian's remains.

In June 2021, PSNI Detective Superintendent Jason Murphy stated that a review of all evidence gathered over the previous 16 years had found nothing to suggest that any Loyalist paramilitary organisation was involved in Dorrian's murder, and he categorically ruled out a paramilitary connection.

== PSNI theory on disappearance ==
In April 2019, PSNI Detective Superintendent Murphy stated that investigators now believed Dorrian had been murdered by a lone perpetrator inside the caravan at Ballyhalbert, possibly between 10:30 pm and 1:15 am on the night she disappeared in 2005. As earlier forensic examinations of the caravan had found no traces of blood or evidence of attempts to clean the scene, detectives considered it most likely that she had been strangled or suffocated, potentially while resisting a sexual assault. Murphy said that the perpetrator then summoned another person to assist in disposing of the body, and that, because this individual had not come forward or disclosed their involvement in more than 20 years, investigators believed the person shared a close relationship with the killer and was most likely an immediate family member.

== See also ==
- List of people who disappeared mysteriously (2000–present)
