= The Disappeared (Northern Ireland) =

People believed to have been murdered during the Troubles in Northern Ireland

The Disappeared were 17 individuals from Northern Ireland who are believed to have been abducted, killed, and secretly buried during the Troubles, primarily by Irish republican paramilitaries. On 27 April 1999, the British and Irish governments established the Independent Commission for the Location of Victims' Remains (ICLVR) to recover their bodies. The Commission operates on a confidential basis and focuses solely on locating and returning the remains to victims' families.

While the ICLVR investigates only the 17 individuals formally designated as the Disappeared, other cases with similar characteristics have been noted in public discourse. These include Lisa Dorrian and Gareth O'Connor, whose disappearances occurred after the Troubles and fall outside the Commission's official mandate.

== Background ==
During the Troubles in Northern Ireland, a number of individuals were abducted, killed, and secretly buried by paramilitary groups – a practice that came to be known as "disappearing". While some groups have acknowledged responsibility for certain cases, others remain unresolved, with no formal admission and only circumstantial evidence suggesting involvement. Following the Good Friday Agreement on 10 April 1998 and its implementation on 2 December 1999, the British and Irish governments established the Independent Commission for the Location of Victims' Remains (ICLVR) to recover the bodies of those who had been secretly buried. The Commission operates on a strictly confidential basis, relying on information provided by members of the public and former paramilitary groups. Its findings cannot be used in legal proceedings, and its sole purpose is to locate and return the remains of the Disappeared to their families.

Of the 17 individuals investigated by the ICLVR, all were Irish Catholics (Jean McConville was a Protestant convert). McConville was the only woman among them; the rest were men. While the Provisional IRA admitted responsibility for several cases and provided varying levels of information about burial sites, one case, that of Seamus Ruddy, who was abducted in France in 1985, was attributed to the Irish National Liberation Army (INLA), a separate republican paramilitary group. As of March 2025, the remains of four victims had yet to be recovered.

== Victims ==
=== 1970s ===
Joseph Lynskey

Joseph Lynskey (40), a veteran Irish republican paramilitary and IRA member from Cavendish Street in Belfast, disappeared during a violent internal IRA feud in the city in August 1972. In 2009, Dolours Price, a former IRA member, stated in a newspaper interview that she had driven the car that took him out of Northern Ireland to an IRA safe house in County Monaghan shortly before his disappearance. In January 2010, the IRA issued a statement confirming that Lynskey had been killed as part of an internal disciplinary process and buried in an unmarked grave. The Irish Indo Daily podcast on 3 December 2024, entitled Joe Lynskey: The monk who joined the IRA and was 'disappeared' over trying to kill his love rival, provided an update on the case. Human remains found at a cemetery in Annyalla, County Monaghan, in November 2024, were subsequently confirmed not to be his. Further remains discovered in another part of the same cemetery in May 2025 were also found not to be his.

Kevin McKee

Seamus Wright

Kevin McKee (17) and Seamus Wright (25) were members of the Provisional IRA who were abducted together in October 1972, suspected of being informants for the British Army's Military Reaction Force (MRF). After interrogation, they were executed and secretly buried in County Meath. Their remains were discovered on 25 June 2015 in a single shallow grave. Their funerals were held in Belfast that September. McKee's funeral took place on 14 September 2015 at St Peter's Cathedral on the Falls Road; following the service, he was buried beside his mother in Blaris Cemetery in Lisburn. Wright's service was held the next day, on 15 September, at St Agnes' Church in Andersonstown, where mourners learned that he had been buried with rosary beads, a programme from the 1968 All-Ireland Football Final, and an autograph from Manchester United manager Matt Busby, items found in his pocket when his remains were recovered. He was cremated afterwards at Roselawn Crematorium in Belfast.

Jean McConville (37), a widowed mother of ten, disappeared in December 1972 after being abducted from her home in Belfast by the Provisional IRA, who accused her of acting as an informer for the British Army. This allegation was later found to be unsubstantiated by official investigations. She was murdered, executed by a single gunshot to the back of the head, and secretly buried. Her remains were discovered 31 years later, in August 2003, on Shelling Hill Beach, County Louth. On 1 November 2003, a Requiem Mass was held at St Paul's Church in Belfast, followed by a funeral procession that paused at Divis Flats, where she had been taken. She was buried at Holy Trinity Cemetery in Lisburn alongside her husband, Arthur, in a funeral attended by her family and the wider community. In October 2014, a man was arrested in connection with her murder, and two further arrests were made in December 2014. Although some suspects, including former IRA member Dolours Price, admitted involvement, no one has been convicted.

Peter Wilson

Peter Wilson (21), a native of West Belfast and one of six siblings, was described by those who knew him as a vulnerable individual with learning difficulties. In the summer of 1973, he was taken by the IRA in the St James area of Belfast, a neighbourhood then marked by intense conflict during the Troubles. He was suspected by the IRA of acting as an informer for British security forces. He was killed following his abduction, and his body was secretly buried in Waterfoot, County Antrim. His remains were discovered there in 2010. A funeral service was held on 11 December 2010 at Holy Cross Church, Belfast, near his home on St James Road, after which he was buried at Milltown Cemetery beside his parents. An inquest held on 11 March 2011 at Belfast Coroner's Court concluded that Wilson had died from four gunshot wounds to the back of the head.

Seamus Maguire

Seamus Maguire (29), was formally recognised as one of the Disappeared in 2022, marking the first new case in more than a decade. He was last seen leaving his home in Aghagallon, near Lurgan, sometime between 1973 and 1974, although later investigations indicate he may have been killed in 1976 after returning from Manchester. His death is believed to have been carried out by republican paramilitaries, though the specific IRA faction involved has not been identified. The ICLVR has been investigating his case since it was referred by the PSNI in 2022, but no burial site has been identified. It is suspected that Maguire was buried in an unmarked location in the Aghagallon/Derryclone area, though searches have yet to yield results.

Eamon Molloy

Eamon Molloy (21), from north Belfast, was abducted by the Provisional IRA on 1 July 1975, following allegations that he had acted as an informant. His remains were recovered on 28 May 1999 at Old Faughart Cemetery, near Dundalk, County Louth, following information provided to the ICLVR. He was found clutching a small cross in his hands. After the recovery was reported in the media, a Catholic priest, Father Eugene McCoy, came forward to say that he had been brought by the IRA to pray with Molloy shortly before his execution, after the young man requested a priest to hear his confession. Molloy, who was bound and distraught, asked the priest to ensure that his wife and mother received two letters he had written during his captivity, and to tell his family that he was not an informer. He was buried on 21 July 1999 following a Requiem Mass at Sacred Heart Church in Belfast, with mourners including relatives of other Disappeared victims.

Columba McVeigh

Columba McVeigh (19), from Donaghmore, County Tyrone, disappeared on 31 October 1975 while living in Dublin, where he was abducted by the IRA. He was suspected of acting as an informer for British security forces. After his disappearance, McVeigh was killed and is believed to have been secretly buried in Bragan Bog, County Monaghan. Six significant search operations have taken place since 1999, covering more than 26 acres (10.5 ha), but his remains have yet to be recovered. The most recent search concluded in November 2023. On 18 August 2025, excavation resumed at Bragan Bog, focusing on an area not previously examined. His remains had still not been found as of October 2025.

Brendan Megraw

Brendan Megraw (23), was taken by the IRA from his home in Twinbrook, Belfast, on 8 April 1978. At the time, he was newly married, and his wife was expecting their first child. On the morning of his abduction, a group of men entered his home, restrained his pregnant wife, and administered an injection they said would keep her calm. When he returned home, he was taken by the men and never seen again. On 1 October 2014, remains discovered in a drainage ditch at Oristown Bog, County Meath, were confirmed through DNA testing in early November 2014 to be his. A funeral service was held on 14 November 2014 at St Oliver Plunkett Church, West Belfast, after which he was buried alongside his parents at St Joseph's Cemetery in Glenavy, County Antrim. An inquest held in December 2015 determined that he had died from a gunshot wound to the forehead.

Robert Nairac (28) was a British Army officer serving in the Grenadier Guards during the Troubles. On 15 May 1977, while working undercover, he was abducted outside the Three Steps Inn in Dromintee, South Armagh. He was transported over the border to Flurry Bridge, County Louth, where he was beaten and shot by the IRA. His body is believed to have been secretly buried, and despite multiple searches, his remains have never been found. The ICLVR has conducted investigations, but efforts to locate his burial site have been unsuccessful.

John McClory

Brian McKinney

John McClory (18) and Brian McKinney (22) were abducted and killed by the Provisional IRA on 25 May 1978. Their remains were discovered in Colgagh Bog, County Monaghan, on 29 June 1999. McKinney had allegedly taken IRA weapons for use in robberies, and his parents made him return the money, believing the matter resolved. However, he was abducted days later, followed by McClory, who was taken because of his association with McKinney. McClory's funeral took place on 3 September 1999, with several hundred mourners attending a Requiem Mass at the Holy Spirit Church on Glen Road, where Father Gordon McKendry condemned the killings as a "crime of satanic proportions". McKinney's funeral followed the next day, on 4 September, and he was buried near his friend, McClory, in Milltown Cemetery, Belfast.

Gerard Evans

Gerard Evans (24), from Crossmaglen, South Armagh, disappeared while hitchhiking home from a dance in Castleblayney, County Monaghan, in March 1979. He was thought to have been abducted and murdered by the Provisional IRA, though no group ever publicly accepted responsibility. According to a masked man identifying himself as a former member of the Provisional IRA South Armagh Brigade, Evans was abducted and executed shortly afterwards. The same source told the Sunday Tribune that Evans had been killed for being an informer, though this allegation was never publicly acknowledged by the IRA. In March 2008, Evans' aunt received an anonymous map indicating a possible burial site, prompting the ICLVR to launch a search. The lead eventually resulted in the discovery of human remains in a bog at Carrickrobbin, near Hackballscross in County Louth in October 2010. Forensic examination confirmed in November 2010 that the remains were those of Evans. His funeral took place at St. Patrick's Church in Crossmaglen on 4 December 2010, after which he was buried in the adjoining graveyard. A coroner's inquest held on 21 September 2011, returned a verdict of unlawful killing, confirming that Evans had died violently at the hands of a paramilitary group.

=== 1980s ===
Eugene Simons

Eugene Simons (26), a plumber and married father of three from Castlewellan, County Down, disappeared on 1 January 1981. Some accounts indicate he may have been suspected by the IRA of betraying the location of bomb-making materials, though no public explanation was ever given. His relatives believe he was set up by individuals he trusted, who left the area soon after his disappearance before later returning and being questioned by police. On 24 May 1984, his body was found by chance in a shallow grave near the village of Knockbridge, southwest of Dundalk in County Louth, reportedly by a dog walker. He was subsequently given a Christian burial, fulfilling a long‑held hope of his father, Walter Simons, who had campaigned for truth and closure on behalf of all families of the Disappeared. Simons is the uncle of actress Laura Donnelly; in 2012, while watching a television documentary about The Disappeared that included him, she told her long time partner, playwright Jez Butterworth, about her uncle and the impact on her family, inspiring Butterworth to write the award winning play The Ferryman.

Danny McIlhone

Danny McIlhone (20) was from Andersonstown, West Belfast. He was abducted in May 1981 while staying at Pearse Tower in Ballymun, Dublin. The Provisional IRA later admitted responsibility for his death, stating that he had been questioned about stolen weapons and was shot during a struggle with his guard. His body was buried in bogland near the village of Lacken in the Wicklow Mountains. Although searches conducted in 1999 and 2000 did not succeed, his partial remains were recovered in 2008. A cowboy boot found at the site helped confirm his identity through DNA analysis. His funeral took place on 22 December 2008 at St Teresa's Church in West Belfast, and he was buried alongside his parents in Milltown Cemetery.

Charles Armstrong

Charles Armstrong (55/56), a married father of five, disappeared in Crossmaglen on 16 August 1981 while driving to Mass. He had planned to pick up an elderly neighbour on the way but never arrived. His abandoned car was later found in Dundalk, County Louth. At the time, the Provisional IRA denied involvement, and no group claimed responsibility. His family initiated a private search for his remains in October 2003. After several years, his remains were found in County Monaghan in July 2010. No official explanation has been provided regarding the circumstances of his abduction and murder. His funeral took place on 18 September 2010 at St Patrick's Church, the same church he had been travelling to when he disappeared, and he was buried in the adjoining graveyard. An inquest held in September 2011 returned a verdict of unlawful killing. Due to the length of time his body had been buried, the exact cause of death could not be determined, though forensic evidence indicated severe skull damage and recently discharged firearms residue was found in his car.

Seamus Ruddy

Seamus Ruddy (32), a teacher and journalist from Newry, Northern Ireland, was abducted in Paris on 9 May 1985, where he had been working as an English teacher after distancing himself from the Irish Republican Socialist Party (IRSP). At the time, the Irish National Liberation Army (INLA) was experiencing violent internal disputes, with factions vying for control. Ruddy, who had previously been involved with the IRSP, the political wing of the INLA, became caught up in these tensions. His former comrades believed he had knowledge of an arms cache near Rouen, France, which led to his kidnapping and murder. His remains were discovered on 6 May 2017 in a forest near Rouen. His funeral took place on 17 June 2017 at St Catherine's Dominican Chapel in Newry, followed by burial at Monks Hill Cemetery, where he was buried alongside his parents.

== Post-1998 disappearances ==
Gareth O'Connor

While the ICLVR investigates cases of individuals who disappeared before the 1998 Good Friday Agreement, it does not handle post-Agreement cases. Public attention has nevertheless focused on several such disappearances, including that of Lisa Dorrian, who went missing from a campsite in Ballyhalbert, County Down, in 2005. Although early media reports speculated about possible loyalist paramilitary involvement, the Police Service of Northern Ireland (PSNI) later concluded that paramilitary groups were not involved in her disappearance. Another frequently cited case is that of Gareth O'Connor, who disappeared in 2003 while on bail and travelling to report to Dundalk Garda station as required under his bail conditions. His body was found in 2005 inside his car, which had been submerged in Newry Canal. While his death has been widely attributed to republican paramilitaries, it has not been formally included in the ICLVR's remit.

These post-1998 disappearances are sometimes referenced in broader discussions about the legacy of the Troubles and transitional justice, though they fall outside the formal scope of the Disappeared as defined by the ICLVR.
