= Hackballscross =

Village in County Louth, Ireland

Hackballscross Crois an Mhaoir
- Village
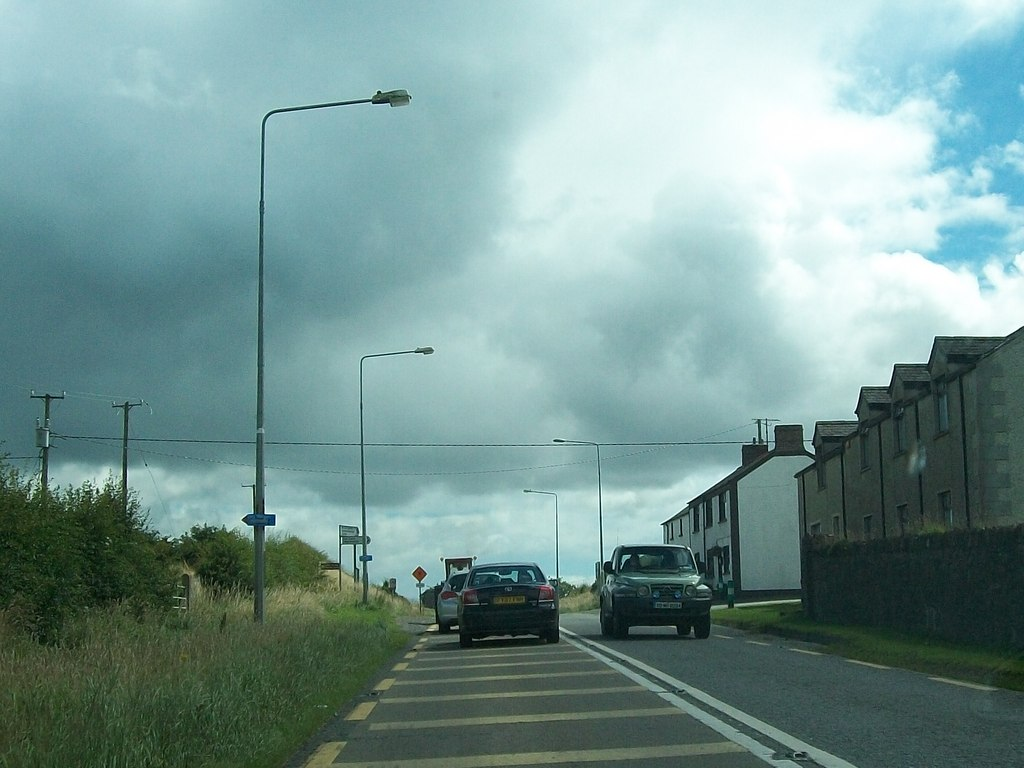
- The N53 at Hackballs Cross

- Location in Ireland
- Coordinates: 54°01′54″N 6°31′30″W
- Country: Ireland
- Province: Leinster
- County: Louth
- Elevation: 68 m (223 ft)
- Time zone: UTC+0 (WET)
  - Summer (DST): UTC-1 (IST (WEST))
- Irish Grid Reference: H96720 10138

Hackballscross (Irish: Crois an Mhaoir) is a small village in County Louth, Ireland. It is located primarily on the N53 road.

== Etymology ==
The origins of the village's unusual name are uncertain; legend has it that a local 18th century landowner hacked thieves or rebels disturbing his property to death. This notorious incident supposedly became the basis of the area's name.

== History ==
On 27 June 2011, the Irish Army conducted a controlled explosion in Hackballscross on explosives suspected to be created by dissident republicans to conduct terrorist attacks in Northern Ireland. 100 kilograms (220 lbs) of homemade explosives and 120 kilograms (265 lbs) of pure ammonium nitrate were found.
