= Patrick Radden Keefe =

American writer (born 1976)

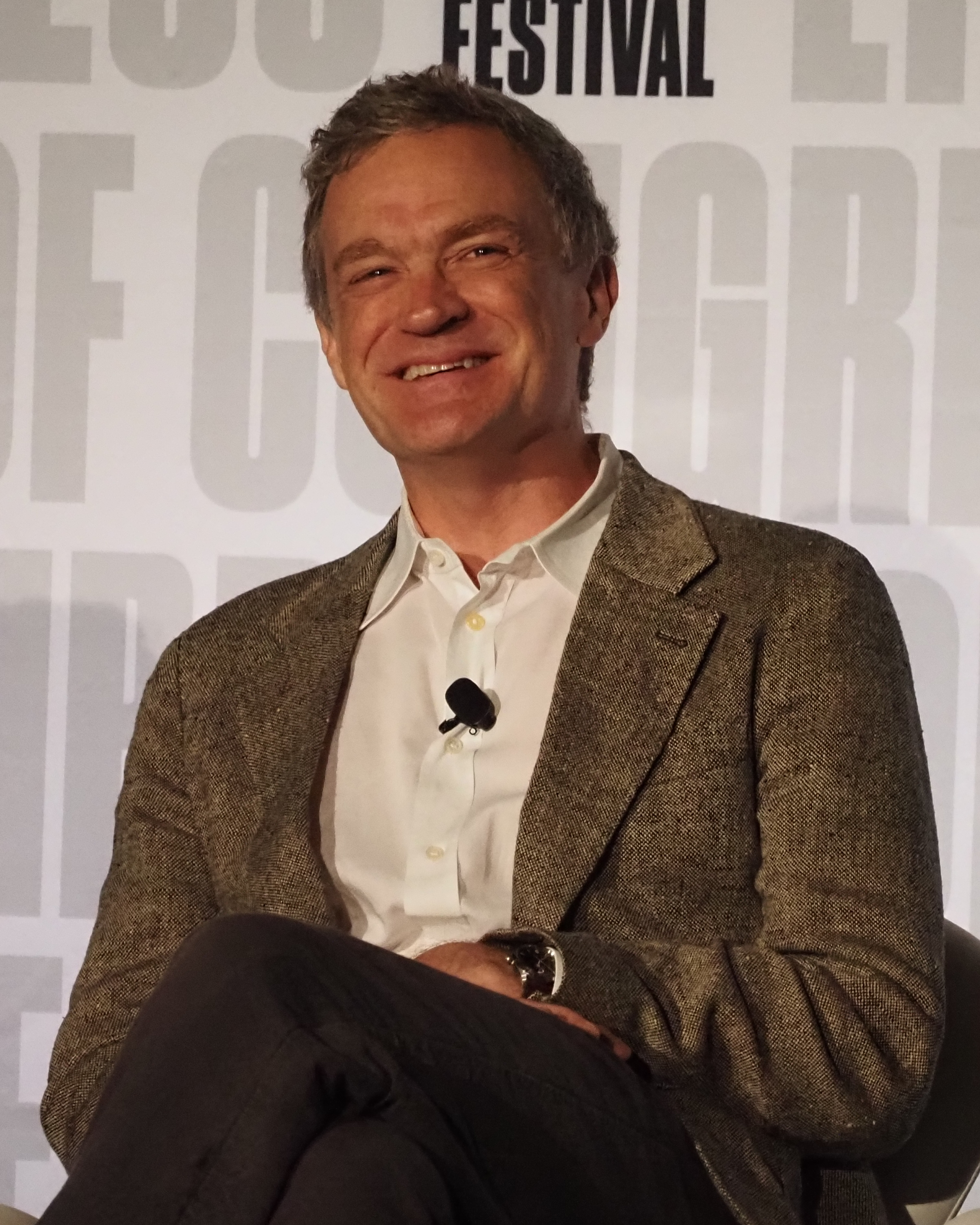
- Keefe in 2026
- Born: 1976 (age 49–50)
- Education: Columbia University (BA); University of Cambridge (MPhil); London School of Economics (MSc); Yale Law School (JD)
- Occupation: Journalist
- Writing career
- Genre: Investigative journalism
- Notable works: Say Nothing and Empire of Pain
- Notable awards: Baillie Gifford Prize (2021); Orwell Prize (2019); National Book Critics Circle Award (2019)

Patrick Radden Keefe (born 1976) is an American writer and investigative journalist. He is the author of six books—Chatter (2005), The Snakehead (2009), Say Nothing (2018), Empire of Pain (2021), Rogues (2022), and London Falling (2026)—and has written extensively for many publications, including The New Yorker, Slate, and The New York Times Magazine. He is a staff writer at The New Yorker.

== Early life and education ==
Keefe was born in 1976. He is the son of Frank Keefe, an urban planner and former Secretary of Administration and Finance of Massachusetts for governor Michael S. Dukakis, and Jennifer Radden, a professor of philosophy at University of Massachusetts Boston. His great-grandparents were Irish immigrants from Donegal. Keefe grew up in Dorchester, Massachusetts, and attended Milton Academy.

He received his B.A. in history from Columbia University in 1999 where he was a resident of Schapiro Hall. He won a Marshall Scholarship in 1999. He then obtained a M.Phil. in international relations from Cambridge University at Hughes Hall and a M.Sc. in new media and informations systems from the London School of Economics. He then returned to the U.S. and earned a J.D. degree from Yale Law School. He passed the bar in 2005.

He has since received many fellowships, including those from the Guggenheim Foundation, the Woodrow Wilson International Center for Scholars, and the Cullman Center for Scholars and Writers at the New York Public Library.

== Career ==
Keefe began writing and submitting articles to newspapers and magazines in 1998. In 2004, he received a New York Public Library fellowship and took a year off of law school to write his first book Chatter. After Keefe finished law school, he briefly worked as a Hollywood screenwriter. He then became a fellow for the Century Foundation. From 2010 to 2011, he was a policy adviser in the Office of the Secretary of Defense.

In 2012, Keefe was hired full time by The New Yorker. His investigative reporting has covered a broad range of topics including drug trafficking and legalization, organized crime mass surveillance, modern American politics, The Troubles, the opioid epidemic, and financial crime. Notably, he has turned several of his New Yorker articles into non-fiction books.

Keefe is the host of the 2020 podcast Wind of Change, which explores a rumor that the song "Wind of Change" by the Scorpions was secretly written by the CIA, rather than by the band's lead singer, Klaus Meine. Keefe won the 2021 Ambies award for "Best Podcast Host".

In 2025, Keefe was hired by J.Crew for a modeling campaign. The New York Times wrote that "Keefe has achieved a level of celebrity that most of his literary peers have probably never even considered: He has been a fashion model."

In 2026, he was a guest on How to Fail..

== Books ==
=== Chatter: Dispatches From the Secret World Of Global Eavesdropping (2005) ===
Keefe describes how American security agencies, including the National Security Agency, eavesdrop on communications between people suspected of involvement in terrorism to determine the likelihood of terrorist attacks in the near future. Keefe describes the electronic intelligence-gathering apparatus for detecting this communication, often called "chatter", and examines it in the context of the September 11 attacks. In a review of the book for The New York Times, William Grimes wrote, "Mr. Keefe writes, crisply and entertainingly, as an interested private citizen rather than an expert."

=== The Snakehead: An Epic Tale of the Chinatown Underworld and the American Dream (2009) ===
Keefe's The Snakehead reported on Cheng Chui Ping and her Snakehead gang in New York City, which operated between 1984 and 2000. The book focuses on the 1993 Golden Venture incident in which a cargo ship smuggling 286 undocumented Chinese ran aground, ultimately killing ten passengers. Keefe describes how Ping illegally smuggled immigrants from China into the U.S. on a massive scale through cargo ships. The book includes interviews with several of those immigrants, who describe their lives in the U.S. In 2000, Ping was arrested by the U.S. government and sentenced to 35 years in prison for her part in leading these operations. Janet Maslin of The New York Times called The Snakehead a "formidably well-researched book that is as much a paean to its author's industriousness as it is a chronicle of crime."

=== Say Nothing: A True Story of Murder and Memory in Northern Ireland (2018) ===
Say Nothing focuses on The Troubles in Northern Ireland, beginning with the 1972 abduction and murder of Jean McConville. Keefe began researching and writing the book after reading Dolours Price's obituary in 2013. He travelled to Ireland seven times over the course of four years while writing the book, interviewing over 100 people. The book was subsequently adapted into a miniseries of the same name in 2024 on FX on Hulu.

=== Empire of Pain: The Secret History of the Sackler Dynasty (2021) ===
In April 2021, his book Empire of Pain: The Secret History of the Sackler Dynasty was published by Doubleday. The book examines the Sackler family and their responsibility in the manufacturing of the painkiller OxyContin by Purdue Pharma. It is an extension of his 2017 New Yorker article "The Family That Built an Empire of Pain."

=== London Falling: A Mysterious Death in a Gilded City and a Family's Search for Truth (2026) ===
In April 2026, Keefe's latest book London Falling: A Mysterious Death in a Gilded City and a Family's Search for Truth was published, again by Doubleday. In the book, he examines the mysterious death of teenager Zac Brettler in London, and explores connections to the city's underworld. A24 UK secured the rights to the book before it was published, and plans to create a television adaptation.

== Personal life ==
Keefe is married to international financial-crime policy lawyer Justyna Gudzowska. They met while they were both studying at Cambridge and later studied at Yale together.

== Awards and accolades ==
Year	Award	Category	Nominee	Result	Ref.
2006	Guggenheim Fellowship		Patrick Radden Keefe	Won	
2012	Woodrow Wilson National Fellowship		Patrick Radden Keefe	Won	
2014	National Magazine Awards	Feature Writing	"A Loaded Gun"	Won	
2015	National Magazine Awards	Reporting	"The Hunt for El Chapo"	Nominated	
2016	National Magazine Awards	Reporting	“Where the Bodies Are Buried"	Nominated	
2019	National Book Award	Nonfiction	Say Nothing: A True Story of Murder and Memory in Northern Ireland	Nominated	
2019	National Book Critics Circle Award	Nonfiction	Say Nothing: A True Story of Murder and Memory in Northern Ireland	Won	
2019	Orwell Prize	Political Writing	Say Nothing: A True Story of Murder and Memory in Northern Ireland	Won	
2020	Andrew Carnegie Medals for Excellence	Nonfiction	Say Nothing: A True Story of Murder and Memory in Northern Ireland	Nominated	
2020	Arthur Ross Book Award	Gold Medal	Say Nothing: A True Story of Murder and Memory in Northern Ireland	Won	
2021	Ambies	Best Podcast Host	Wind of Change – Patrick Radden Keefe	Won	
2021	Ambies	Best Reporting	Wind of Change – Patrick Radden Keefe	Won	
2021	Ambies	Best Scriptwriting, Nonfiction	Wind of Change – Patrick Radden Keefe	Won	
2021	Baillie Gifford Prize for Non-Fiction		Empire of Pain: The Secret History of the Sackler Dynasty	Won	
2021	Financial Times Business Book of the Year Award		Empire of Pain: The Secret History of the Sackler Dynasty	Nominated	
2021	Goodreads Choice Awards	History & Biography	Empire of Pain: The Secret History of the Sackler Dynasty	Won	
2022	Andrew Carnegie Medals for Excellence	Nonfiction	Empire of Pain: The Secret History of the Sackler Dynasty	Nominated	
2022	J. Anthony Lukas Book Prize		Empire of Pain: The Secret History of the Sackler Dynasty	Nominated	
2025	Peabody Awards	Entertainment Honoree	Say Nothing	Won	
2025	USC Scripter Awards	Episodic Series	Say Nothing - Patrick Radden Keefe and Joshua Zetumer (for "The People in the Dirt")	Won	
2026	Kirkus Prize	Nonfiction	London Falling	Finalist	

== Bibliography ==
=== Books ===
- — (2005). Chatter: Dispatches From the Secret World of Global Eavesdropping. New York: Random House. ISBN 9781400060344.
- — (2009). The Snakehead: An Epic Tale of the Chinatown Underworld and the American Dream. New York: Doubleday. ISBN 9780307279279.
- — (2018). Say Nothing: A True Story of Murder and Memory in Northern Ireland. New York: Doubleday. ISBN 9780307279286.
- — (2021). Empire of Pain: The Secret History of the Sackler Dynasty. New York: Doubleday. ISBN 9781984899019.
- — (2022). Rogues: True Stories of Grifters, Killers, Rebels and Crooks. New York: Doubleday. ISBN 9780593467732.
- — (2026). London Falling: A Mysterious Death in a Gilded City and a Family's Search for Truth. New York: Doubleday. ISBN 9780385548533.

=== Essays and reporting ===
- — (February 5, 2005). "A Shortsighted Eye in the Sky". The New York Times. Vol. 154, no. 53116. p. A17.
- — (February 16, 2005). "Digital Underground". Village Voice. Vol. 50, no. 7. p. 14.
- — (May 15, 2005). "The Insider". The Boston Globe. Vol. 267, no. 135. p. D1.
- — (August 10, 2005). "Big Brother and the Bureaucrats". The New York Times. Vol. 154, no. 53302. p. A21.
- — (August 11, 2005). "Bolton Participated in Unethical Snooping". Peninsula Daily News. p. A7.
- — (August 12, 2005). "Government Ears are Eavesdropping". The Sacramento Bee. Vol. 293, no. 224. p. B7.
- — (February 1, 2006). "I Spy". Wired Magazine. Vol. 14, no. 2. p. 128–133.
- — (February 23, 2006). "The Spy Who Bills Us". The Boston Globe. Vol. 269, no. 54. p. A11.
- — (March 12, 2006). "Can Network Theory Thwart Terrorists?". The New York Times Magazine. Vol. 155, no. 53516. pp. 16–18.
- — (April 24, 2006). "The Snakehead". The New Yorker. Vol. 82, no. 10. pp. 68–85.
- — (December 13, 2006). "Ghettonomics". National Post. Vol. 9, no. 41. p. A20.
- — (May 7, 2007). "The Idol Thief". The New Yorker. Vol. 83, no. 11. pp. 58–67.
- — (June 25, 2007). "Don't Privatize Our Spies". The New York Times. Vol. 156, no. 53986. p. A19.
- — (September 3, 2007). "The Jefferson Bottles". The New Yorker. Vol. 83, no. 26. pp. 106–117.
- — (April 28, 2008). "State Secrets". The New Yorker. Vol. 84, no. 11. pp. 28–34.
- — (November 1, 2008). "Legislating in the Dark". Index on Censorship Magazine. Vol. 37, no. 4. p. 14–27.
- — (December 14, 2008). "Big Brother Hasn't Won". The New York Times. Vol. 158, no. 54524. p. 11.
- — (February 8, 2010). "The Trafficker". The New Yorker. Vol. 85, no. 48. pp. 36–47.
- — (October 3, 2011). "Welcome to Newburgh, Murder Capital of New York". New York Magazine. Vol. 44, no. 31. pp. 38–100.
- — (January 9, 2012). "Reversal Of Fortune". The New Yorker. Vol. 87, no. 43. pp. 38–49.
- — (June 17, 2012). "Cocaine Incorporated: The Snow Kings of Mexico". The New York Times Magazine. p. 36.
- — (September 15, 2012). "Billion-Dollar Baron". The Daily Telegraph. No. 48926. pp. 39–45.
- — (February 11, 2013). "A Loaded Gun". The New Yorker. Vol. 89, no. 1. p. 1.
- — (July 8, 2013). "Go-Between". The New Yorker. Vol. 89, no. 20. p. 31.
- — (July 8, 2013). "Buried Secrets". The New Yorker. Vol. 89, no. 20. pp. 50–63.
- — (November 18, 2013). "Buzzkill". The New Yorker. Vol. 89, no. 37. p. 40–51.
- — (November 25, 2013). "Rocket Man". The New Yorker. Vol. 89, no. 38. p. 48–67.
- — (March 29, 2014). "Blogs of War: Fighting chemical warfare from the sofa". The Daily Telegraph. pp. 20–29. (Note: Online version is titled "The blogger who tracks Syrian rockets from his sofa")
- — (May 5, 2014). "The Hunt For EL Chapo". The New Yorker. Vol. 90, no. 11. p. 38–67.
- — (January 19, 2015). "Corruption and Revolt". The New Yorker. Vol. 90, no. 44. pp. 30–37.
- — (March 16, 2015). "Where the Bodies are Buried". The New Yorker. Vol. 9`, no. 4. pp. 42–61.
- — (September 21, 2015). "Assets and Liabilities". The New Yorker. Vol. 91, no. 28. pp. 94–99.
- — (September 28, 2015). "The Avenger". The New Yorker. Vol. 91, no. 29. pp. 40–53.
- — (February 1, 2016). "Snackish". The New Yorker. Vol. 91, no. 46. pp. 18–19.
- — (May 30, 2016). "The Bank Robber". The New Yorker. Vol. 92, no. 16. pp. 36–47.
- — (August 22, 2016). "Total Recall". The New Yorker. Vol. 92, no. 25. pp. 48–57. (Note: Online version is titled "The Detectives Who Never Forget A Face")
- — (February 13, 2017). "Journeyman". The New Yorker. Vol. 93, no. 1. pp. 52–65. (Note: Online version is titled "Anthony Bourdain’s Moveable Feast")
- — (July 31, 2017). "Limited Liability". The New Yorker. Vol. 93, no. 22. pp. 28–33. (Note: Online version is titled "Why Corrupt Bankers Avoid Jail")
- — (August 28, 2017). "Trump's Favorite Tycoon". The New Yorker. Vol. 93, no. 25. pp. 46–59. (Note: Online version is titled "Carl Icahn’s Failed Raid on Washington")
- — (October 30, 2017). "Empire of Pain". The New Yorker. Vol. 93, no. 34. pp. 34–49. (Note: Online version is titled "The Family That Built an Empire of Pain")
- — (April 30, 2018). "McMaster And Commander". The New Yorker. Vol. 94, no. 11. pp. 36–49.
- — (August 6, 2018). "Crime Family". The New Yorker. Vol. 94, no. 23. pp. 32–45. (Note: Online version is titled "How a Notorious Gangster Was Exposed by His Own Sister")
- — (January 7, 2019). "Winning". The New Yorker. Vol. 94, no. 43. pp. 30–45. (Note: Online version is titled "How Mark Burnett Resurrected Donald Trump as an Icon of American Success")
- — (February 10, 2019). "Who Killed Jean McConville?". The Boston Globe. Vol. 295, no. 41. p. Z40–Z43.
- — (March 31, 2019). "The Irish Border is a Scar". the New York Times. Vol. 168, no. 58283. p. 8.
- — (July 18, 2021). "How Did the Sacklers Pull This Off?". The New York Times. Vol. 170, no. 59123. p. 2.
- — (January 24, 2022). "The Bounty Hunter". The New Yorker. Vol. 97, no. 46. pp. 32–35. (Note: Online version is titled "Jordan Thomas’s Army of Whistle-Blowers")
- — (May 23, 2022). "Relief Army". The New Yorker. Vol. 98, no. 13. pp. 12–13. (Note: Online version is titled "José Andrés Feeds Ron Howard, Then Feeds Him Some More")
- — (June 13, 2022). "King Josh". The New Yorker. Vol. 98, no. 16. pp. 34–47. (Note: Online version is titled "The Surreal Case of a C.I.A. Hacker’s Revenge")
- — (July 31, 2023). "Money On The Wall". The New Yorker. Vol. 99, no. 22. pp. 30–49. (Note: Online version is titled "How Larry Gagosian Reshaped the Art World")
- — (January 1, 2024). "The Ventriloquist". The New Yorker. Vol. 99, no. 44. pp. 24–33. (Note: Online version is titled "How a Script Doctor Found His Own Voice")
- — (February 5, 2024). "The Oligarch's Son". The New Yorker. Vol. 99, no. 48. pp. 34–49. (Note: Online version is titled "A Teen’s Fatal Plunge Into the London Underworld")

=== Journal articles ===
- — (2009). "Snakeheads and Smuggling: The Dynamics of Illegal Chinese Immigration". World Policy Journal. 26 (1): 33–44.

=== Podcasts ===
- — (2020). "Wind of Change" (Podcast). Pineapple Street Studios, Crooked Media, Spotify.
