= Ed Moloney =

Irish journalist and author (1948–2025)

- Born: Edmund Gerrard Morton Moloney; 5 May 1948; Aldershot, England
- Died: 17 October 2025 (aged 77); New York City, U.S.
- Occupations: Author and journalist
- Employer(s): Magill, Sunday Tribune, and The Irish Times,
- Known for: Journalist and author who covered the Troubles in Northern Ireland
- Spouse: Joan McKiernan
- Children: Ciarán Moloney

Edmund Gerrard Morton Moloney (5 May 1948 – 17 October 2025) was an Irish journalist and author, best known for his coverage of the Troubles in Northern Ireland and the activities of the Provisional IRA, in particular.

Moloney worked for the Hibernia magazine and Magill before going on to serve as Northern Ireland editor for The Irish Times and subsequently for the Sunday Tribune. He was living and working in New York City at the time of his death. His first book, Paisley, co-authored by Andy Pollak and published in 1986, was a biography of Unionist leader Ian Paisley.

In 2002, he published a best-selling history of the Provisional IRA, A Secret History of the IRA. A second edition was published in July 2007. This was followed, in 2008, by a new edition of Paisley: From Demagogue to Democrat?, of which Moloney is the single author.

In 1999, he was voted Irish Journalist of the Year.

== Early life ==
Moloney was born in Aldershot, England on 5 May 1948 and spent part of his childhood in Alexandria, West Dunbartonshire in Scotland. He had polio as a boy, which left him disabled.

In his earlier life he was involved with the Official IRA.

== Killing of Pat Finucane ==
On 27 June 1999, Moloney published a story based on his 1990 interviews he had with Ulster Defence Association (UDA) quartermaster Billy Stobie. Stobie claimed that, in a separate incident, the Special Branch had framed him by planting guns at his home. He related his version of the circumstances of Pat Finucane's death to be published as assurance should anything untoward happen to him. The account was published when, as part of the Stevens Enquiry Stobie was arrested and charged with Finucane's murder.

Moloney refused to comply with a court order that he should give to the police notes he had made during the interviews. He faced jail or heavy fines but, in October 1999, Lord Chief Justice Sir Robert Carswell ruled at the High Court in Belfast that the judge had been mistaken in ordering Moloney to turn over his notes to the police.

== Belfast Project ==
Moloney directed Boston College's Belfast Project, which collected interviews with republican and loyalist militants, to be released only after the interviewees had died. In March 2010, the book Voices from the Grave was published, which featured interviews with Brendan Hughes (who had died in 2008) and David Ervine (who had died in 2007), compiled by researchers from the project. He based the book on the interviews given by Hughes and Ervine. Excerpts from the book published by The Sunday Times relate to Hughes discussing his role in the IRA.

Events recorded in the book include Hughes' actions in regard to the disappearance of Jean McConville and others, Bloody Friday, and the sourcing of IRA weapons, among other details of Hughes' IRA career. In October 2010, Irish broadcaster RTÉ aired an 83-minute television documentary co-produced by Moloney based on Voices from the Grave. In February 2011, Voices From the Grave won the best television documentary prize at the annual Irish Film and Television Awards.

== Views ==
Supporting Glenn Greenwald, Moloney wrote in 2013:

"Most ominously in their efforts to silence dissent from within government, Obama/Holder are seeking to criminalize the media, insinuating in some prosecutions that by facilitating a whistleblower, journalists can be accomplices in crime. So far the White House has shied from actually following through with charges but it is not beyond the bounds of possibility that they may try to over the Snowden case, hence the fierce hostility to the radical journalist Glenn Greenwald in establishment politican [sic] and media circles."

== Assassination attempt ==
In May 2020, Village magazine revealed attempts to assassinate Moloney and Vincent Browne had been planned in 1982.

In the February 1982 Irish general election, Sinn Féin the Workers' Party had won three seats and found themselves in a position of power. The three TDs voted for Charles Haughey of Fianna Fáil as opposed to Garret FitzGerald of Fine Gael. After the election, Moloney wrote two articles on Sinn Féin – The Workers' Party for the Irish Times. The first dealt with the party's political journey and appeared in print. The second, which dealt with the continuing existence of the Official IRA and its criminal activities, did not. An unknown member of the Irish Times passed Moloney's article to the Official IRA. Moloney said that this part "never appeared and I was never officially informed nor given any explanation by the Irish Times. I cannot even say whether my copy was even shown above the level of sub-editor".

Moloney then passed on his research to Magill, edited then by Vincent Browne. A two-part series was published in the March and April 1982 issues and they sold out. It was embarrassing for Sinn Féin – The Workers' Party.

The Official IRA set Moloney up to be murdered, though it is not clear if this was done before or after the publication of the Magill articles. Two members of SFWP told the UDA that Moloney was in the Irish National Liberation Army.

Moloney ended up in the UDA HQ in Gawn Street, facing John McMichael, Davy Payne and a third member of the UDA Inner Council that Moloney did not name, but who was still alive in May 2020. Payne in particular had a history of involvement with sectarian torture and murder. Cathal Goulding and the Official IRA must have known that if the UDA had fallen for their allegations, the latter would have abducted and tortured Moloney before murdering him, with Davy Payne as most likely choice for interrogator. Moloney was told that the UDA Inner Council did not believe the allegations.

Although Moloney did not record the date of his confrontation with the UDA, he said he handed over material to Magill "some time after" the encounter. The assassination attempt was thus meant to kill him and suppress information that had not been published by the Irish Times.

== Death ==
On 17 October 2025, Moloney died at a hospital in New York City due to complications from an infection, aged 77.
