= Martin Ingram =

British covert military intelligence agent

Martin Ingram is the pseudonym of ex-British Army soldier Ian Hurst, who served in the Intelligence Corps and Force Research Unit (FRU). He has made a number of allegations about the FRU and its conduct of the British Army, its operations in Northern Ireland via the FRU, and against figures in the Provisional Irish Republican Army (IRA) and Sinn Féin.

== Background ==
Born in Greater Manchester in October 1960, Ingram joined the Parachute Regiment in 1980, and was thereafter recruited by the Intelligence Corps. At the completion of his training Ingram was promoted to lance corporal. Ingram was posted to 121 Intelligence unit in Northern Ireland in late 1981, where his main job was to input Royal Ulster Constabulary intelligence documents into a British military intelligence database at Thiepval Barracks. A few months later, he was moved to another department that focused on gathering intelligence on Loyalist paramilitaries in north Belfast. In 1982, Ingram was posted to Ebrington Barracks in Derry to work as an intelligence analyst for the Force Research Unit and was promoted to corporal. Ingram moved to England in the summer of 1984 for personal reasons and continued to work in the field counter terrorism, which included a six month tour of duty in Belize to monitor developments in Sandinista Nicaragua. Ingram was promoted to sergeant in 1986 and returned to Northern Ireland in 1987 to work as a covert agent handler for the Force Research Unit while being based out of RAF St Angelo.

Ingram left Northern Ireland for the final time in late September 1990 and applied for Premature Voluntary Retirement from the British military the following year. Regarding his motive for leaving the British Army, Ingram would later claim that he became romantically involved with his future wife in the late 1980s while posted in Northern Ireland, and the fact her family in County Donegal had Irish Republican sympathies would have had a negative effect on his career prospects if he had continued working for British military intelligence. By the early 2000s, Ingram was living in County Tipperary.

== British intelligence whistleblower ==
In 1999, Ingram gave a series of interviews to The Sunday Times describing his time as a British covert military intelligence agent, such as how Force Research Unit operators worked closely on missions with elite units such as the Special Air Service and the 14th Intelligence Company and the methods FRU members used to entice potential agents to work for them. Ingram also described how FRU operators were granted special privileges in the course of their work, such as the power to overrule senior officers in ordering an area to be cleared of regular security force patrols or by requesting immediate helicopter cover. Ingram additionally revealed that the top undercover agent inside the IRA was a man with the codename "Stakeknife", who had been working for the FRU since the late 1970s on an annual salary of £60,000 per year.

In November 1999, The Sunday Times published an article where Ingram accused FRU operators of being responsible for an arson attack on offices occupied by the Stevens Inquiry team at RUC Headquarters in Carrickfergus in 1990, which was an apparent effort to destroy evidence of crimes committed by one of its double agents (allegedly Brian Nelson). Ingram also claimed that an FRU agent within the IRA, who was in charge of an arms dump, had informed his handler that in mid-April 1984 he was ordered to retrieve a sniper rifle for use in an upcoming attack. However, to protect the agent's cover, the FRU decided to allow the attack to proceed without attempting to thwart it, which resulted in the death of Queen's Regiment Private Neil Clarke after being shot in the head in Derry on Easter Monday 1984. A few days after the article was published, Defence Secretary Geoff Hoon obtained an injunction against The Sunday Times that banned publication of any further information from Ingram. In December 1999, Ingram was arrested and questioned under suspicion of breaching the Official Secrets Act, but no charges were brought due to lack of evidence.

In the March 2001, Ingram wrote an article for the Andersonstown News to defend his role as a whistleblower, and stated his motivation for publicly revealing details was to expose the British government's role in covering up its own security force agents involvement in the murder of innocent people during The Troubles. Ingram also claimed that when Brian Nelson was appointed the UDA's intelligence chief in 1987, he handed over their entire cache of targeting files to the FRU, who then updated them with information taken from RUC Special Branch and Military Intelligence files before handing them back to Nelson for use in the planning of assassinations.

In the summer of 2001, Ingram was interviewed by the Lawyers Committee for International Human Rights regarding the murder of Pat Finucane by Loyalist paramilitaries in 1989. Ingram alleged that there were three separate attempts to assassinate Finucane, and the first two were thwarted after advance warning by Force Research Unit agent Brian Nelson allowed security forces to temporarily increase troop numbers near his home in north Belfast. Ingram further alleged that the FRU alerted RUC Special Branch to the failed attempts on Finucane's life, and that William Stobie and Tommy Lyttle, who were later involved in the successful assassination of Finucane, were both Special Branch informers at the time.

In 2004, Ingram co-authored a book detailing Force Research Unit activates during the 1980s regarding covert agent handling within illegal Irish paramilitary groups. In the book, Ingram reasserted his claim that a senior IRA member named Freddie Scappaticci, who once headed its Internal Security Unit, was the British government's highest-ranking agent, known by the codename "Stakeknife". Ingram also alleged that when information came to light in 1987 that Scappaticci was to be assassinated by the Ulster Defence Association, the FRU instructed its own agent Brian Nelson to target innocent civilian Francisco Notarantonio instead in order to protect Scappaticci.

In May 2006, Ingram accused Martin McGuinness of being a double agent within the IRA, after sharing with the Irish media an alleged transcript of an intercepted phone call between agent codenamed "J118" and his MI6 handler regarding an upcoming attack on a British military checkpoint at Coshquin in October 1990. Although he was not named on the actual transcript, Ingram claimed he was able verify the codename "J118" with confidential sources within the British government, who confirmed that was McGuinness's codename. Ingram further alleged that McGuinness had vouched for and promoted an FRU agent named Frank Hegarty against the advice of other Republicans in Derry, so that Hegarty could reveal the location of several arms dumps of Libyan-supplied weapons to his handlers in early 1986. McGuinness denied Ingram's allegations, and later raised a case with the Press Complaints Commission in relation to a newspaper article covering the story.

In April 2023, Ingram alleged that Martin McGuinness had thwarted three separate internal IRA investigations into Freddie Scappaticci after he had come under suspicion of being a British agent. Ingram also claimed that Scappaticci had also tried to sue him personally for breaching what he deemed to be a "duty of care" in relation to outing him publicly as "Stakeknife".

In a February 2025 podcast series for The Telegraph, Ingram accused his former commanding officer at the Force Research Unit, Gordon Kerr, of being a proud Scottish Loyalist who let his own bigotry towards Irish Catholics cloud his judgement. Ingram also accused a former FRU colleague named Margaret Walshaw, who was Brian Nelson's handler, of passing information to Nelson (such as photographs and vehicle registration numbers) to help plan assassinations.

== Smithwick Tribunal ==
In later years, Ingram gave evidence to the Smithwick Tribunal, in which he claimed to have previously reviewed confidential British intelligence documents that identified Garda Owen Corrigan as a double agent for the IRA. Ingram testified that he first became aware of Garda Owen Corrigan from November 1987 onwards while working for the Force Research Unit near Enniskillen. Ingram further alleged that his superior officer told him that Garda Owen Corrigan's contact for handing over information to the IRA was a covert double agent named "Stakeknife" (a.k.a. Freddie Scappaticci).

== See also ==
- Stakeknife
- Freddie Scappaticci
- Force Research Unit
- British Military Intelligence Systems in Northern Ireland
- Phone hacking scandal reference lists
- Metropolitan police role in phone hacking scandal
