= Tommy Lyttle =

Ulster loyalist

- Tommy Lyttle in 1984
- Born: c. 1939; Belfast, Northern Ireland
- Died: 18 October 1995 (aged 56); Donaghadee, County Down, Northern Ireland
- Other name: "Tucker"
- Occupations: Machinist bookmaker
- Known for: Brigadier of the West Belfast Ulster Defence Association (UDA) (1975–1990)
- Spouse: Elizabeth Baird
- Children: 3 sons, 2 daughters

Tommy "Tucker" Lyttle (c. 1939 – 18 October 1995), was a high-ranking Ulster loyalist during the period of religious-political conflict in Northern Ireland known as "the Troubles". A member of the Ulster Defence Association (UDA) – the largest loyalist paramilitary organisation in Northern Ireland – he first held the rank of lieutenant colonel and later was made a brigadier. He served as the UDA's spokesman as well as the leader of the organisation's West Belfast Brigade from 1975 until his arrest and imprisonment in 1990. According to journalists Henry McDonald and Brian Rowan, and the Pat Finucane Centre, he became a Royal Ulster Constabulary (RUC) Special Branch informer.

== Ulster Defence Association ==
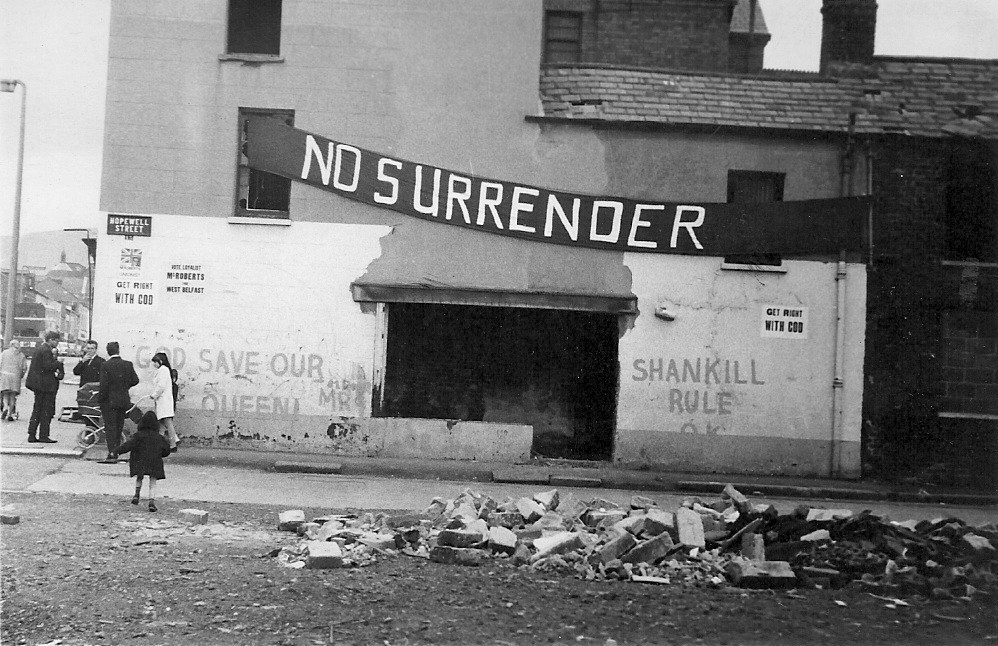
A side street off the Lower Shankill Road as it appeared in the early 1970s

Lyttle was born in Belfast and grew up in the loyalist Shankill Road area in a Protestant family as one of five children. In the late 1960s, he worked as a machinist in Mackie's Foundry in the Springfield Road. He later became a bookmaker. At the age of 18, he married Elizabeth Baird, by whom he had three sons and two daughters.

In 1969, the religious-political conflict known as "The Troubles" broke out; two years later in 1971, he became a founding member of the legal loyalist paramilitary organisation, the Ulster Defence Association. (Note: The Ulster Defence Association remained a legal organisation from its founding in September 1971 until 10 August 1992 when it was proscribed by the British Government.) According to his daughter, Linda, he joined the UDA after a Provisional Irish Republican Army (PIRA) bomb exploded at the Balmoral furniture showroom in the Shankill Road in December 1971, killing four people, including two babies. Lyttle's wife and two daughters had been close to the scene of the explosion but were unhurt.

In 1972, he was a lieutenant colonel in the UDA's "C" Company, 2nd Battalion Shankill Road; in 1975 he rose to the rank of brigadier, having command of the West Belfast Brigade. He had taken over the brigade from Charles Harding Smith, the former leader of the UDA, and its first commander following the organisation's formation. Although Andy Tyrie was the UDA's overall commander (from 1973 to 1988), brigadiers such as Lyttle enjoyed a large degree of autonomy and regarded the areas under their control as "their personal fiefdoms". He was a member of the UDA's Inner Council and served as the UDA's spokesman. His youngest son, Thomas "Tosh" Lyttle also joined the UDA.

=== Rise to West Belfast Brigadier ===
It was alleged by Irish journalist Kevin Myers that Lyttle was with fellow UDA member Davy Payne when two Catholics, Patrick O'Neill and Rosemary McCartney, were abducted at a UDA roadblock and brought to one of the UDA's notorious "romper rooms" to be interrogated and tortured, with Payne having presided over the "grilling" and the subsequent double killing on 21 July 1972, the day the IRA had exploded 22 bombs in various areas of Belfast resulting in the deaths of nine people including UDA member William Irvine and two Protestant teenagers, William Crothers and Stephen Parker.

He was an Independent Unionist candidate for North Belfast in the 1973 Northern Ireland Assembly elections. He was not elected, however, having only polled a total of 560 votes. Along with Tommy Herron and Billy Hull he was one of three leading UDA figures to stand for election in Belfast, with all three failing to win a seat. He took his loss in stride with the statement: "It's not such a bad result for someone whose day job is a bookie".

During the Ulster Workers' Council Strike of May 1974 Lyttle was, along with UDA leader Andy Tyrie and Ken Gibson of the Ulster Volunteer Force (UVF), one of three loyalist paramilitaries chosen to accompany the three leaders of the main unionist political parties, Harry West, Ian Paisley, and Ernest Baird, to a meeting with Stanley Orme, the deputy to the Secretary of State for Northern Ireland Merlyn Rees, in which the government representative attempted unsuccessfully to have the strike terminated early.

Together with Tyrie, Vanguard Assemblyman Glenn Barr, his ally Andy Robinson and Newtownabbey-based Harry Chicken, Lyttle travelled to Libya where he met Colonel Muammar Gaddafi about obtaining weapons and money for the loyalist cause. When Lyttle returned from the trip, which was largely unsuccessful, he was caught up in a loyalist feud between Tyrie and Charles Harding Smith for overall control of the UDA. Lyttle was with Harding Smith when the latter was shot and wounded by a sniper in January 1975. Following the attack Tyrie asserted his control and, with the help of Lyttle and fellow Shankill commanders John McClatchey and Tommy Boyd, soon regained control of the pivotal Shankill and neighbouring Woodvale areas. Harding Smith survived another shooting later that year before leaving Northern Ireland for good. Lyttle was then appointed West Belfast Brigadier in his stead.

With the feud ended and firmly established as a loyal supporter of Tyrie, Lyttle was sent by Tyrie to the United States to solicit support and funding from interested groups. In 1977 he helped form a think tank with UDA Commander Andy Tyrie and South Belfast brigadier John McMichael; this was called the New Ulster Political Research Group. Along with Tyrie, McMichael, Glenn Barr and Harry Chicken, Lyttle was involved in the production of the group's 1979 policy document Beyond the Religious Divide in which the UDA advanced a policy of negotiated independence for Northern Ireland.

== Stevens Enquiry ==
In January 1990, Lyttle, along with his son, "Tosh", was arrested by the John Stevens Enquiry team after his fingerprints were found on a stolen classified document which was a security forces list of suspected republicans, likely to be used by loyalist paramilitaries for targeting people to be assassinated by hit squads. He was brought before Belfast's Crumlin Road Court where he was convicted of receiving and passing on classified security force intelligence files and intimidating potential witnesses. Although sentenced to seven years imprisonment, he was released in 1994 on remission.

Journalists Henry McDonald and Brian Rowan, in company with the Pat Finucane Centre, later revealed that Lyttle was an informer working for the RUC's Special Branch with the codename "Rodney Stewart". A former officer from the Force Research Unit (the covert military intelligence agent-handling unit based in Northern Ireland) using the pseudonym "Martin Ingram" suggested that Lyttle ordered Nelson, who was recruited by the FRU to infiltrate the UDA's intelligence structure, to compile targeting information on a Catholic solicitor Pat Finucane from a republican family prior to his killing in 1989. "Ingram" stated he knew with "iron cast certainty" that Lyttle was working as an informer for Special Branch at the time of the Finucane killing. According to Andy Tyrie, Lyttle was reluctant to become personally involved in the Finucane killing, as he feared that his rank of brigadier would make him a likely target for the inevitable IRA retaliation.

Stobie was later arrested and charged with Finucane's killing, although he was not convicted. UDA member Ken Barrett, who was also a Special Branch informer, eventually pleaded guilty to the killing in September 2004. Shortly before Lyttle's death in October 1995, BBC journalist John Ware interviewed him. Lyttle maintained that two RUC officers had originally proposed the idea of killing Finucane. Lyttle allegedly claimed to another journalist that his Special Branch handler suggested "Why don't you whack Finucane?"

Two years prior to Finucane's assassination, Lyttle reportedly had asked Nelson to obtain details on top IRA figures. When the name Frederick Scappaticci came up, Nelson's FRU handlers became alarmed as Scappaticci—allegedly known as "Stakeknife"—was one of their most important agents, having infiltrated the Provisional IRA's Internal Security Unit or "Nutting Squad" as it was commonly referred to. A substitute was eventually found in the person of Francisco Notarantonio, a retired IRA man of Italian parentage who had been interned previously. On 9 October 1987, Lyttle sent out a UDA hit squad, headed by Sam McCrory using the cover name "Ulster Freedom Fighters" (Note: The "Ulster Freedom Fighters" was the cover name used by the UDA when they carried out killings and attacks to avoid proscription by the British Government as was the case with their rival loyalist paramilitary group the Ulster Volunteer Force (UVF)) to Notarantonio's home where they shot him to death in his bedroom. Allegedly a party was held afterwards in Lyttle's Sydney Street West home to celebrate the killing. Lyttle threw a similar party following the assassination of Finucane.

The possibility of conspiracy became public through Lyttle himself, following the shooting of Loughlin Maginn on 25 August 1989. Media coverage showed Maginn as the innocent victim of a sectarian attack but Lyttle personally contacted members of the press to inform them that the UDA had good reasons for killing Maginn, whose name was on the list. To back up his claims, he sent a copy of the list he received to a journalist. The uproar that followed the revelation that a senior UDA member was in possession of government documents led to Royal Ulster Constabulary Chief Constable Hugh Annesley appointing Stevens, an officer in Cambridgeshire Constabulary, to investigate the claims.

== John McMichael killing ==
John McMichael was blown up by a booby-trap car bomb outside his Lisburn home on 22 December 1987. Although the IRA claimed responsibility for the attack, there were suggestions that members of the UDA helped set up the killing by passing on information to the IRA about McMichael to facilitate the assassination. Lyttle put the blame on his long-time rival James Pratt Craig, the UDA's notorious "fundraiser", who had been under investigation by McMichael for his racketeering activities. There was considerable animosity between the two UDA men, as Craig had allegedly impregnated one of Lyttle's daughters.

== Removal from leadership ==
Following the televised Milltown Cemetery attack by loyalist Michael Stone in March 1988, Lyttle released a statement claiming that Stone had operated alone without sanction from the UDA's Inner Council as he felt that such commando-style attacks would inevitably bring retaliation from republican paramilitaries, making open warfare between the two communities a real possibility. However, Stone's actions—in which three republicans were shot dead and more than 60 wounded—impressed many young loyalists who rushed to join the UDA. This change in membership profile was to have a profound effect on the make-up of the UDA leadership.

With McMichael dead, Tyrie having resigned in March 1988 (following an attempt on his life) and Craig being assassinated by UFF gunmen in October 1988, Lyttle was one of the few veterans to remain in power and his incarceration during the Stevens Enquiry was to prove the catalyst for his removal from command, with Tommy Irvine succeeding him as West Belfast brigadier. By 1989–90, information regarding UDA operations was being deliberately withheld from Lyttle "because he was thought to be not reliable". His close personal relationship with Ulster Volunteer Force (UVF) chief John "Bunter" Graham was also a source of animosity as the younger members tended to view the UVF as a rival organisation despite their shared loyalism.

Held in Crumlin Road Gaol from July 1991, word was sent into the prison by a new group of "Young Turks"—emerging leaders from the Shankill—that Lyttle was to be ostracised by the other UDA inmates. As a result of this edict Lyttle was moved into secure isolation on a wing of the prison usually reserved for prisoners under high risk of attack from other inmates, such as sex offenders; an area described by one of the new leaders, Jim Spence, as "the wing with the ball-roots [a local slang term of abuse]". As the 1990s progressed, Lyttle had little involvement in the UDA leadership on the Shankill Road, which had passed to Johnny Adair and other young, ambitious militants such as Stephen McKeag who wanted a freer hand in dealing with Catholics than that afforded by Lyttle with the latter's alleged links to the security forces".

== Death and legacy ==
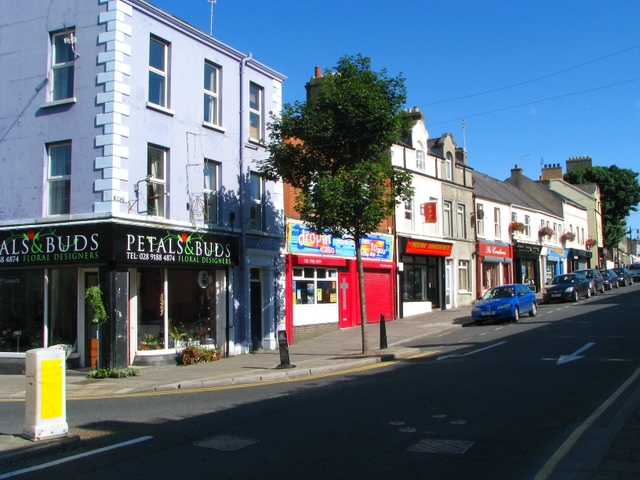
Donaghadee, where Lyttle had died after retiring there following his release from prison

Lyttle was released in 1994 on remission after having served three years of his seven-year sentence. Immediately after his release he was summoned to appear before the UDA Inner Council and reportedly admitted to working for Special Branch. He later claimed he avoided being executed by convincing the leadership that "the Branch had helped him. He hadn't helped them". He left his home in the Shankill and retired to Donaghadee, County Down, where he died of a heart attack on 18 October 1995 as he was playing snooker in a local pub. He was 56 years old.

His second son, John, a journalist who writes for The Independent, has described his father as a "hard man" who liked to read James Bond novels, and watch western and gangster films. He recounted a scene from his childhood when he had gone downstairs to get a glass of water and discovered a bloodied man tied to a chair being beaten by his father. Tommy Lyttle momentarily stopped hitting his victim to order one of his henchmen to fetch his son a glass of water. Kevin Myers, who was personally acquainted with Lyttle in Belfast, called him "a violent man" but admitted to having liked him.

== Bibliography ==
- Taylor, Peter (1999). Loyalists. London: Bloomsbury Publishing Plc.; ISBN 0-7475-4519-7
- McDonald, Henry & Cusack, Jim (2004). UDA – Inside the Heart of Loyalist Terror. Dublin: Penguin Ireland ISBN 978-1-844-88020-1
- Wood, Ian S. (2006). Crimes of Loyality: a History of the UDA. Edinburgh University Press ISBN 978-0-748-62427-0

Other offices
Preceded by Charles Harding Smith	Ulster Defence Association West Belfast Brigadier; 1975–1990	Succeeded by Tommy Irvine
