= Ken Barrett (loyalist) =

Northern Irish former loyalist paramilitary

Ken Barrett (born c. 1963) is a Northern Irish former loyalist paramilitary. A leading figure within the Ulster Defence Association (UDA), Barrett was involved in collusion between loyalists and the British security forces during the Troubles.

== Early years ==
Barrett was a native of the loyalist Shankill Road area of Belfast and attended the same school as future leader Johnny Adair, Somerdale Secondary School on Somerdale Park (Barrett was, however, a few years above Adair). Barrett joined the UDA some time in the early to mid-1980s and was part of the West Belfast Brigade's B Company which covered the Woodvale area at the top of the Shankill. Barrett quickly gained a reputation within the West Belfast UDA as one of their most zealous gunmen. According to Henry McDonald and Jim Cusack, Barrett became one of RUC Special Branch's paid informers within the UDA in the late 1980s.

According to a fellow UDA member at the time, interviewed by David Lister and Hugh Jordan and identified by them only as "Davy", he and Barrett had collaborated on a number of killings at the time, including that of Paddy McAllister in August 1986, Terry McDaid in May 1988, Gerard Slane in September 1988, and Eamon Quinn in February 1990. The latter killing in particular was the handiwork of Barrett as he had shot the wounded Quinn several times in the head and stomach after he had initially been wounded by "Fat" Jackie Thompson of C Company.

One police detective described Barrett as a "compulsive gambler" and one of the "most cold-blooded killers he had ever met".

== Pat Finucane murder ==
It was Barrett's involvement in the murder of Pat Finucane, an Irish solicitor alleged by loyalists to be in the Provisional IRA, which was to shape his future. According to the aforementioned "Davy", he had joined with Barrett and Johnny Adair on the night of the killing (12 February 1989), to hijack a car from a taxi driver in Glencairn. He claimed that Barrett then drove the car to the Finucane family home and, whilst Barrett sat outside in the driver's seat, Adair and "Davy" forced their way inside and fired fourteen shots to kill Finucane. The UDA claimed the killing soon afterwards, describing it as "the execution of Pat Finucane the PIRA officer, not the solicitor".

== Brigadier ==
As part of the fallout from the Stevens Inquiries and the series of arrests that took place during them Barrett was briefly given the role of West Belfast Brigadier. Long-serving leader Tommy Lyttle had been arrested and as convention dictated he had to vacate the brigadiership whilst in custody, so command passed to Tommy Irvine. Before long however, Irvine was also arrested as part of the Stevens inquiries and so Barrett was promoted to the top job. However, Barrett proved to be an ineffectual leader and before long he was pushed aside in favour of Billy Kennedy, Tommy Lyttle's brother-in-law and the man chosen by the former brigadier as his successor. Eventually Jim Spence would emerge as brigadier with Adair as military commander as power passed into the hands of the Lower Shankill's C Company. Despite being sidelined, Barrett remained close to the new leadership and was frequently recorded as being in the company of Adair around 1990 and 1991 by police surveillance files. On 17 January 1991 Barrett shot and wounded Thomas McCreery, a former hitman for the UDA's North Belfast Brigade who had gone freelance as a drug dealer and whose activities were threatening the West Belfast Brigade's own expanding drugs empire.

== Stevens inquiries ==
Under interrogation, in 1991 Barrett had confessed to Johnston Brown, a Royal Ulster Constabulary (RUC) officer who spent much of his career investigating the activities of the UDA in West Belfast, that he had fired shots into Finucane as he lay on the ground. Other police officers serving at the time recalled Barrett as a braggart, who regularly boasted to them that he had killed ten people. The tape upon which the confession was made then disappeared. Lister and Jordan suggest that this, rather than the late 1980s, was the point at which Barrett was taken on as an RUC Special Branch informer.

The evidence provided by Barrett as an informer saw him resettled in England as part of a witness protection scheme. His involvement in providing information on the activities of his fellow UDA members had become common knowledge with graffiti appearing on the Shankill denouncing him as a "big nose, big mouth tout". He was taken from Belfast by the Stevens team after fellow informer William Stobie was killed by the UDA in 2001.

== Finucane trial ==
Barrett was interviewed for an episode of the BBC's documentary series Panorama, which was examining the Finucane murder. Barrett was shown telling the programme that he had been involved in the killing and the documentary reignited the furore over the issue of collusion between the security forces and loyalist paramilitaries. In the documentary, Barrett claimed that the murder had initially been suggested by Jim Spence of C Company and that Spence had introduced Barrett to a contact in Special Branch who had informed Barrett that Finucane controlled the Provisional IRA's finances. Barrett also claimed that an RUC roadblock had been set up specifically to help the killers that night, adding that "Finucane would have been alive today if the peelers [police] hadn't interfered".

Barrett was arrested for the murder of Pat Finucane in England in late May 2003 after he had boasted to two undercover policemen, posing as international drug dealers as part of a sting operation, that he had "fucking massacred" Finucane. Johnny Adair, who had been expelled from the UDA in 2003, had hoped to use the Finucane trial to push for his own return as he believed that his arch rival Jim Spence would be revealed in the course of the trial as an agent of the British government, something Adair had maintained in his criticism of Spence. According to author Ian S. Wood, Spence called on the help of UDA brigadier Mo Courtney in an attempt to secure Barrett's co-operation in avoiding as long a case as possible. Wood claimed that Spence had promised Courtney a substantial sum of money to "lean on" Barrett, with both men being held on remand in Maghaberry at the time. In secret recordings played at his trial he described his feelings after killing Finucane, "I lost no sleep over it. All is fair in love and war. I have to be honest, I whacked a few people in the past". Barrett pleaded guilty to the murder as well as eleven other charges and as a result only briefly appeared on the stand with Spence's name not mentioned in his short testimony. He was sentenced to life imprisonment with a recommendation that he serve a minimum of twenty-two years.

=== Reaction and release ===
The Finucane trial outcome was met with much scepticism, notably by the Finucane family themselves who demanded, and continue to call for, a proper inquiry into the allegations of collusion surrounding the solicitor's death. Johnny Adair was equally dismissive of Barrett's guilty plea and disputed the version of events that had been provided by "Davy". According to Adair "Barrett is a bastard informer and I hate him, but he did not pull the trigger" and he added that he had not been involved either before adding that he had no intention of informing on the real guilty party.

Despite the recommendation that Barrett serve a minimum 22 years the Sentence Review Commission endorsed his case for early release and he was freed from Maghaberry, to which he had been transferred, in May 2006. Barrett left Northern Ireland immediately after his release.

Preceded by Tommy Irvine	Ulster Defence Association West Belfast Brigadier; 1990	Succeeded by Billy Kennedy
