= Sean O'Callaghan =

Former member of the Provisional Irish Republican Army

Sean O'Callaghan (10 October 1954 – 23 August 2017) was a member of the Provisional Irish Republican Army (IRA), who from the late 1970s to the mid-1980s worked against the organisation from within as a mole for the Irish Government with the Garda Síochána's Special Branch.

In the mid-1980s he left the IRA and subsequently voluntarily surrendered to British prosecution for actions he had engaged in as an IRA volunteer in the 1970s. Following his release from imprisonment, he published a memoir detailing his life in Irish Republican paramilitarism entitled The Informer: The True Life Story of One Man's War on Terrorism (1998).

Former taoiseach Garret FitzGerald described O'Callaghan as one of the Irish Government's most important spies operating within the Provisional IRA during the late 20th century's The Troubles.

== Early life ==
O'Callaghan was born on 26 January 1954, into a family with a Fenian paramilitary history, in Tralee, County Kerry. His paternal grandfather had taken the Anti-Treaty side during the Irish Civil War, and his father had been interned by the Irish government at the Curragh Camp in County Kildare for his IRA activity during World War II.

By the late 1960s, the teenaged O'Callaghan had ceased practising the Catholic faith, adopted atheism and had become interested in the theories of Marxist revolutionary politics, which found an outlet of practical expression in the social unrest in Northern Ireland at that time, centred on the activities of the Northern Ireland Civil Rights Association. O'Callaghan soon became attracted to the newly founded Provisional Irish Republican Army (IRA) due to his obsession with the Irish revolutionary socialist James Connolly; a left-wing nationalist, O'Callaghan believed that a renewed armed struggle by Irish republicans could result in a cross-Ireland revolution led by the IRA. In 1969, communal riots broke out in Northern Ireland, which led him to join the IRA at the age of 17.

Soon afterwards, he was arrested by local Gardaí after he accidentally detonated a small amount of explosives, which caused damage to the homes of his parents and their neighbours. After demanding, and receiving, treatment as a political prisoner, O'Callaghan quietly served his sentence.

== Provisional Irish Republican Army activity ==
After becoming a full-time paramilitary with the IRA, in the early to mid 1970s O'Callaghan took part in over seventy operations associated with Irish Republican political violence including bomb materials manufacture, attacks on IRA targets in Northern Ireland, and robberies to provide funding for the organisation. On 2 May 1974 he was part of an attack by an IRA force on a 6th Battalion, Ulster Defence Regiment (UDR) base at the village of Clogher in County Tyrone, with sustained automatic-rifle fire, anti-tank rockets, and rounds fired from an improvised mortar which was operated by O'Callaghan. During this attack a female UDR recruit was killed. On 23 August 1974 O'Callaghan killed Detective Inspector Peter Augustine Flanagan, a 47-year-old Catholic police officer and head of the Omagh Division of the Royal Ulster Constabulary's Special Branch, by shooting him repeatedly with a handgun in a two-man IRA attack in a public house in the town of Omagh in County Tyrone.

== Irish Government agent within the IRA ==
In 1976, aged 22, O'Callaghan ended his involvement with the IRA after becoming disillusioned with its activities. He later recalled that his disenchantment with the IRA began when one of his compatriots openly hoped that a female police officer who had been blown up by an IRA bomb had been pregnant so they could get "two for the price of one." He was also concerned with what he perceived was an undercurrent of ethnic hatred in its rank and file towards the Ulster Scots population. He left Ireland and moved to London. In May 1978, he married a Scottish woman of Protestant unionist descent. During the late 1970s, he ran a successful mobile cleaning business. However, he was unable to fully settle in his new life, later recalling: "In truth there seemed to be no escaping from Ireland. At the strangest of times I would find myself reliving the events of my years in the IRA. As the years went on, I came to believe that the Provisional IRA was the greatest enemy of democracy and decency in Ireland".

In 1979 O'Callaghan was approached by the IRA seeking to recruit him again for its paramilitary campaign. In response, he decided to turncoat against the organisation and become an agent within its ranks for the Irish Government. In his memoir, O'Callaghan described his reasoning as follows:

I had been brought up to believe that you had to take responsibility for your own actions. If you did something wrong then you made amends. I came to believe that individuals taking responsibility for their own actions is the basis for civilisation, without that safety net we have nothing.

O'Callaghan later told authors Kevin Cullen and Shelley Murphey that he decided to become a double agent even though he knew that even those who hated the IRA as much as he now did have a low opinion of informers; as he put it, "there is nothing worse in Ireland than being an informer." However, he felt it was the only way to stop the IRA from luring teenagers into their ranks and training them to kill.

Soon after being approached by the IRA to re-join he returned to Tralee from London, where he arranged a clandestine meeting with an officer of the Garda Special Branch in a local cemetery, at which O'Callaghan expressed his willingness to work with it to subvert the IRA from within. At this point, O'Callaghan was still opposed to working with the British Government. A few weeks later, O'Callaghan made contact with Kerry IRA leader Martin Ferris and attended his first IRA meeting since 1975. Immediately afterwards, he telephoned his Garda contact and said, "We're in". According to O'Callaghan, "Over the next few months plans to carry out various armed robberies were put together by the local IRA. It was relatively easy for me to foil these attempts; an occasional Garda car or roadblock at the 'wrong time'; the routine arrest of Ferris or myself; or simple 'bad planning', such as a car arriving late – a whole series of random stratagems".

During the 1981 hunger strike in the Maze Prison, he attempted to start his own hunger strike in support of the Maze prisoners but was told to desist by the IRA for fear it would detract focus from the prisoners. O'Callaghan successfully sabotaged the efforts of republicans in Kerry from staging hunger strikes of their own.

In 1984 he notified the Garda of an attempt to smuggle seven tons of AK-47 assault rifles from the United States to Ireland aboard a fishing trawler named Valhalla. The guns were intended for the arsenal of the Provisional IRA's units. The shipment had been organised by the Winter Hill Gang, an Irish-American crime family of South Boston, Massachusetts. As a result of O'Callaghan's warning, a combined force of the Irish Navy and Gardaí intercepted the boat that received the weaponry, and the guns were seized. The seizure marked the complete end of any major attempt by the IRA to smuggle guns out of the United States, which ended three years earlier with the arrest of the IRA's primary gunrunner George Harrison by the American Federal Bureau of Investigation (FBI).

O'Callaghan claimed to have been tasked in 1983 by the IRA with placing 25lb of Frangex in the Dominion Theatre in London, to try to kill Prince Charles and Princess Diana who were due to attend a charity pop music concert there. A warning was phoned into the Garda, and the Royal couple were hurriedly ushered from the theatre by their police bodyguard during the concert. The theatre had been searched before the concert and a second search following the warning revealed no device.

In 1985, O'Callaghan was elected as a Sinn Féin councillor for Tralee Urban District Council, and unsuccessfully contested a seat on Kerry County Council.

== Imprisonment ==
After becoming disillusioned with his work with the Irish Government after the murder of another of its agents within the IRA (Sean Corcoran in County Kerry in 1985), which it had failed to prevent despite O'Callaghan's warnings of the threat to him, and sensing a growing threat to himself from the organisation which had become suspicious of his own behaviour, O'Callaghan withdrew from the IRA and left Ireland to live in England, taking his wife and children with him. His marriage ended in a divorce in 1987, and on 29 November 1988 he walked into a police station in Tunbridge Wells, Kent, England, where, presenting himself to the officer on duty at the desk he confessed to the murder of UDR Greenfinch (female member) Eva Martin and the murder of D.I. Peter Flanagan during the mid-1970s, and voluntarily surrendered to British prosecution.

Although the Royal Ulster Constabulary offered him witness protection as part of the informer policy, O'Callaghan refused it, and was prosecuted under charges of two murders and 40 other crimes, to all of which he pled guilty, committed in British jurisdiction with the IRA. Having been found guilty he was jailed for a total of 539 years. O'Callaghan served his sentence in prisons in Northern Ireland and England. While in jail, he published his story in The Sunday Times. He was released after being granted the Royal Prerogative of Mercy by Queen Elizabeth II in 1996.

== Post-IRA life ==
In 1998 O'Callaghan published an autobiographical account of his experiences in Irish Republican paramilitarism, entitled The Informer: The True Life Story of One Man's War on Terrorism (1998). In the book's text he stated (shortly before the death of Eamon Collins, another former IRA member who had prominently turned upon the organisation):

I know that the organisation led by Gerry Adams and Martin McGuinness would like to murder me. I know that that organisation will go on murdering other people until they are finally defeated. It is my belief that in spite of IRA/Sinn Féin's strategic cunning, and no matter how many people they kill, the people of the Irish Republic expect, because they have been told so by John Hume, that there will be peace. There may come a time when their patience runs out. If that were to happen there would be no place for IRA/Sinn Féin to hide. We must work tirelessly to bring that day forward.

In 2002 he was admitted to The Nightingale Hospital, Marylebone, an addiction and rehab center where he underwent a rehabilitation program for alcohol dependency. His identity and past activities were not revealed to the other patients. O'Callaghan lived relatively openly in London for the rest of his life, having refused to adopt a new identity. He was befriended in the city by the Irish writer Ruth Dudley Edwards, and worked as a security consultant, and also occasional advisor to the Ulster Unionist Party on how to handle Irish Republicanism in general, and Sinn Féin in particular.

In 2006, O'Callaghan appeared in a London court with regard to an aggravated robbery that had occurred in which he was the victim.

In 2015 O'Callaghan published James Connolly: My Search for the Man, the Myth & his Legacy (2015), a book containing a critique of the early 20th century Irish revolutionary James Connolly, and what O'Callaghan considered to be his destructive legacy in Ireland's contemporary politics.

== Death ==
O'Callaghan died by drowning after suffering a heart attack at the age of 62 while in a swimming pool in Kingston, Jamaica in August 2017, while visiting his daughter. His death was reported on 23 August 2017. A memorial service was held in his memory on 21 March 2018 at St Martin's in the Fields Church, in London, which was attended by representatives from Ulster Unionist parties and the Irish Government.

== Disputed claims of O'Callaghan's accounts ==
Sources in Sinn Féin have publicly denied aspects of the statements made by O'Callaghan with regard to his IRA career, particularly the claim that he had attained the leadership of the IRA's Southern Command, and had been a delegate to the IRA Army Council, claims O'Callaghan made both in print and before a Dublin jury under oath. A 1997 article in An Phoblacht alleged that O'Callaghan "has been forced to overstate his importance in the IRA, and to make increasingly outlandish accusations against individual republicans".

O'Callaghan also claimed to have attended an IRA finance meeting in Letterkenny in 1980 with, among others, lawyer Pat Finucane and Sinn Féin politician Gerry Adams. Following his death at the hands of Loyalist paramilitaries, Finucane's family denied that he had been a member of the IRA, and the organisation did not claim or memorialise him as a member after the event. The RUC and the Stevens Report indicated that, to their knowledge he was not believed to have been an IRA member, although he came from an Irish Republican background and three of his brothers (Dermot, John, and Seamus) had been involved in paramilitarism. Adams repeatedly stated that, although associated closely with Irish Republican politics, he had never been a member of the IRA.

While O'Callaghan claimed to have quit being an informant after being disillusioned by the murder of Sean Corcoran, there remains suspicion that O'Callaghan may have been the perpetrator of Corcoran's death. O'Callaghan once claimed that the IRA had ordered him to kill Corcoran and that he did so to protect his cover, but he later repudiated this claim, stating he had only admitted to the murder to trigger a police investigation.

== Publications ==
- The Informer. Bantam Press. 1998. ISBN 978-0593042854.
- James Connolly: My Search for the Man, the Myth & his Legacy. Century. 2015. ISBN 978-1780894348.
