= Force Research Unit =

British Army covert intelligence unit

- Active: 1980–2007
- Country: United Kingdom
- Branch: British Army
- Type: Military intelligence unit
- Role: Agent handling Black operation Clandestine human intelligence Clandestine operation Counterterrorism; Covert operation Espionage; Military intelligence Special operations Special reconnaissance Surveillance
- Size: 42 operators and 26 support staff
- Part of: Intelligence Corps
- Garrison/HQ: Templer Barracks, Ashford, Kent
- Motto: Fishers of Men
- Engagements: Operation Banner (The Troubles)

The Force Research Unit (FRU) was a covert military intelligence unit of the British Army's Intelligence Corps. It was established in 1980 during the Troubles to obtain intelligence from terrorist organisations in Northern Ireland by recruiting and running agents and informants. From 1987 to 1991, it was commanded by Gordon Kerr. The FRU was renamed the Joint Support Group (JSG) following the Stevens Inquiries into allegations of collusion between the security forces and Protestant paramilitary groups. The FRU was found to have colluded with loyalist paramilitaries by the Stevens Inquiries. This has been confirmed by some former members of the unit.

== Overview ==
Although the exact size of the unit was classified, former FRU operator Martin Ingram revealed in an interview that it consisted of 42 agent handlers and 26 support staff in the late 1980s. According to Ingram, their locations and staffing levels were:

	North Det	South Det	East Det	West Det	Head Quarters
Location	Ebrington Barracks (Derry)	Bessbrook Mill (South Armagh)	Palace Barracks (Greater Belfast)	RAF St Angelo (Enniskillen)	Thiepval Barracks (Lisburn)
FRU Handlers	8	8	14	6	6
Support Staff	6	6	6	4	4

The Force Research Unit worked alongside existing intelligence agencies including the Special Branch of the Royal Ulster Constabulary and MI5. In 1988, the All-Source Intelligence Cell was formed to improve the sharing of intelligence between the FRU, Special Branch and MI5. FRU operators were armed with cutting edge Heckler & Koch weapons normally reserved for elite counter terrorist units, such as the MP5K compact submachine gun and the HK53 carbine assault rifle. FRU operators worked closely on missions with elite units such as the Special Air Service and the 14th Intelligence Company, who were based out of a secure area of Aldergrove Flying Station at the time. They were also granted special privileges in the course of their work, such as the power to overrule senior officers in ordering an area to be cleared of regular security force patrols or by requesting immediate helicopter cover. The FRU likewise had the power to designate specific properties as "off limits" to RUC searches in order to protect agents or the intelligence documents the agents were in control of.

The British government has previously attempted to stop information about the FRU from becoming public, such as obtaining an injunction against The Sunday Times and arresting former FRU operatives who went public under suspicion of breaching the Official Secrets Act. Unsuccessful attempts were also made by an unknown "British Intelligence Agency" to pressure the Internet service provider of the US based Cryptome website into removing an article naming former FRU operatives. In a 2000 interview with the Sunday Herald, an unnamed FRU operator denied accusations that they were a rogue unit, asserting that there was an unbroken chain of command from the agents on the ground all the way up to the highest levels of the Conservative Party-led government of the day (and ultimately Prime Minister Margaret Thatcher).

The Force Research Unit - photographed in early 1980's at a Sergeants' Mess evening. FRU operators allegedly visible in the picture include: Peter Charles Jones (front row, circled in purple), David Moyles (middle row, circled in purple), Gordon Kerr (circled in blue), Margaret Walshaw (circled in yellow), Phillip Campbell-Smith (circled in white). The men wearing plain black Tuxedos (instead of mess dress uniform) are believed to be members of the S.A.S / 14th Intel

members of Force Research Unit 'West Det' photographed in late 1980's. FRU operators allegedly visible in the picture include: Martin Ingram (left side, circled in white), Peter Charles Jones (circled in yellow), Phillip Campbell-Smith (right side, circled in white)

== List of former Force Research Unit personnel ==
Notable individuals who reportedly served in the Force Research Unit include:

- Colin Parr
- Peter Everson
- Gordon Kerr (a.k.a Colonel 'J')
- George Victor Williams
- Ian Hurst (a.k.a Martin Ingram)
- Margaret Walshaw BEM
- Peter Charles Jones
- David Moyles
- Philip Campbell-Smith (a.k.a Rob Lewis)
- Ronnie Anderson

== Covert agent handling ==
Agent handling by the FRU was primarily carried out via face-to-face meetings on a near weekly basis. Telephone contacts were discouraged, unless an urgent matter arose, as an agent could be overheard by family member's while using their house phone and the frequent use of phone boxes would raise suspicion.

Face-to-face meetings were tape-recorded and then transcribed on a Contact Form, after which the contents of the audio tape was erased. A copy of the Contact Form would be sent to FRU headquarters in Lisburn, who would then share any relative information with the RUC. A typical Contact Form consisted of the following sections:

CF1	details of FRU handlers, the meeting places, routes to and from the meeting, vehicles used, etc ...
CF2	summary of agent's events and activities since the last meeting, plus details of any intelligence of use to the security forces
BACKGROUND	the reason for the meeting being called
FINANCE	details of payments to the agent and any other associated financial matters
WELFARE	matters relating to the agent's personal welfare
SECURITY	the agent's personal security at that time and that of the meeting
MOTIVATION	the agent's motivation for providing any new information
CASE DEVELOPMENT	how FRU intended to develop the agent or particular aspects of his role
ACCESS	the agent's access to sources of information
TASKING	the new batch of tasks set for the agent by FRU
CF3	details of debriefing of the agent by their handier (i.e.) advice on how to perform their role more effectively, instructions on what to do before the next meeting, etc.

== Collusion with loyalist paramilitaries ==
In the mid 1980s, the FRU recruited Brian Nelson as a double agent inside the Ulster Defence Association (UDA), and helped him to become the UDA's chief intelligence officer. Until it was proscribed in 1992, the UDA was a legal Ulster loyalist paramilitary group that had been involved in hundreds of attacks on Catholic and nationalist civilians as well as against republican paramilitaries. In the summer of 1985, Nelson traveled to South Africa in an unsuccessful attempt to procure weapons and debriefed his FRU handlers on his return. Nelson was also allegedly involved in the 1988 Ulster Resistance weapons importation from South Africa.

Through Nelson, the Force Research Unit helped the UDA to target people for assassination. In a March 2001 article for the Andersonstown News, Martin Ingram claimed that when Brian Nelson was appointed the UDA's intelligence chief in 1987, he handed over their entire cache of targeting files to the FRU, who then updated them with information taken from RUC Special Branch and Military Intelligence files before handing them back to Nelson for use in the planning of assassinations. In 1998, The Sunday Telegraph published a series of articles detailing the activities of the FRU and Brian Nelson's interactions with the unit. Secret documents examined by the newspaper suggested that the specific purpose of running Nelson in the UDA was to ensure that the Loyalist paramilitaries he sourced intelligence for would only target people actively involved in Republican terrorism, instead of indiscriminately murdering Catholics at random. Evidence showed that Nelson was involved in at least 15 murders, 15 attempted murders, and 62 conspiracies to murder during his time as an FRU agent.

In a 2000 interview with the Sunday Herald, an unnamed FRU operator identified Margaret Walshaw as being Nelson's primary FRU handler between 1986 and 1990, and accused her of colluding with him by sourcing maps, photos, and personal details of people to be targeted for assassination. The article further alleged that Walshaw even bought Nelson a personal computer so that information could be more effectively passed to him in floppy disk format, and the chances of him being arrested with incriminating documents could be reduced. Walshaw was also accused of failing to prevent murders she had advanced knowledge of, such as when Brian Robinson shot Patrick McKenna in a random attack. According to the source, Walshaw left Ireland in 1990 to become an FRU instructor with the Intelligence Corps.

In 2003, the BBC reported that FRU commanders aimed to make the UDA "more professional" by helping it to target and kill republican activists and prevent it from killing uninvolved Catholic civilians. If someone was under threat, agents like Nelson were to inform the FRU who were then to alert the police. Gordon Kerr, who ran the FRU from 1987 to 1991, claimed Nelson and the FRU saved over 200 lives in this way, and testified on Nelson's behalf for mitigation during his 1992 trial under the alias "Colonel J". Kerr defended the actions of the FRU regarding Nelson by asserting that the planning phase of assassinating a known PIRA activist took much longer than the usual ad hoc shooting of a random Catholic, which therefore allowed the FRU to warn RUC Special Branch to prepare "counter-measures", such as increasing the level of security forces in the area of the target's home. Kerr claimed that 730 intelligence reports had been forwarded to Special Branch in this manner, that identified threats to 217 individuals.

However, the Stevens Inquiries found evidence that only two lives were saved and said many loyalist attacks could have been prevented but were allowed to go ahead. The Stevens team believes that Nelson was responsible for at least 30 murders and many other attacks, including most prominently solicitor Pat Finucane, and that many of the victims were uninvolved civilians. The Cory Collusion Inquiry and a separate inquiry by Sir Desmond de Silva both also discovered evidence of collusion between the Brian Nelson and the FRU in the murder of Patrick Finucane. Although Nelson was imprisoned in 1992, FRU intelligence continued to help the UDA and other loyalist groups. From 1992 to 1994, loyalists were responsible for more deaths than republicans for the first time since the 1960s.

Allegations exist that the FRU sought restriction orders, a de-confliction agreement to restrict patrolling or surveillance in an area over a specified period, in advance of a number of loyalist paramilitary attacks in order to facilitate easy access to and escape from their target. This de-confliction activity was carried out at a weekly Tasking and Co-ordination Group which included representatives of the Royal Ulster Constabulary, MI5 and the British Army. It is claimed the FRU asked for restriction orders to be placed on areas where they knew loyalist paramilitaries were going to attack.

In a February 2025 podcast series for The Telegraph, former FRU operator Martin Ingram accused his former commanding officer at the Force Research Unit, Gordon Kerr, of being a proud Scottish Loyalist who let his own bigotry towards Irish Catholics cloud his judgement. Ingram also accused a former FRU colleague named Margaret Walshaw, who was Brian Nelson's handler, of passing information (such as photographs and vehicle registration numbers) to Nelson to help plan assassinations.

Kerr had no moral qualms about anything that we were up to, and he knew of every decision taken by his men. At the time I had no qualms either. We saw what was happening as a war and we were going to fight fire with fire. Kerr had one policy, in his own words it was: You go in, and you go in heavy. Raise the temperature on the ground to boiling point and then reduce it fast. That means you hurt your enemy so hard that you reduce the risk of casualties on your side. Then you step back quickly. That means the enemy is constantly in a state of terror and panic. It's an old SAS tactic.

— Excerpt of interview with former FRU operative (November 2000)

== Alleged infiltration of republican paramilitary groups ==
FRU are also alleged to have handled agents within republican paramilitary groups. A number of agents are suspected to have been handled by the FRU including IRA units who planted bombs and assassinated. Attacks are said to have taken place involving FRU-controlled agents highly placed within the IRA.

It is suspected that the FRU sought to influence the IRA primarily through an agent codenamed "Stakeknife", thought to have been a member of the IRA's Internal Security Unit (a unit responsible for counter-intelligence, interrogation and court martial of informers within the IRA). There is a debate as to whether this agent was IRA member Freddie Scappaticci or another, as of yet unidentified, IRA member. It is believed that "Stakeknife" was used by the FRU to influence the outcome of investigations conducted by the IRA's Internal Security Unit into the activities of IRA volunteers.

It is alleged that, in 1987, the UDA came into possession of details relating to the identity of the FRU-controlled IRA volunteer codenamed "Stakeknife" and that, unaware of this IRA volunteer's value to the FRU, they planned to assassinate him. Allegedly, after the FRU discovered "Stakeknife" was in danger from UDA assassination, they used Brian Nelson to persuade the UDA to assassinate Francisco Notarantonio instead, a Belfast pensioner who had been interned as an Irish republican in the 1940s. The killing of Notarantonio was claimed by the UFF at the time. Following the killing of Notarantonio, unaware of the involvement of the FRU, the IRA assassinated two UDA leaders in reprisal attacks. It has also been alleged that the FRU secretly passed details of the two UDA leaders to the IRA via "Stakeknife" in an effort to distract attention from him as a possible informer.

== FRU and the Stevens Inquiry ==
Former FRU operative Martin Ingram asserted that the arson attack which destroyed the offices of the Stevens Inquiry at RUC Headquarters in Carrickfergus in 1990 was carried out by the FRU to destroy evidence on operational activities collected by Stevens' regarding crimes committed by one of its double agents (allegedly Brian Nelson). At the conclusion of the Stevens Inquiry in 2003, files on nine former members of the FRU were sent to the Director of Public Prosecutions in Northern Ireland in regards to illegal activity uncovered by the inquiry.

== See also ==
- Stakeknife
