= Peter Madden =

Peter Madden may refer to:

- Peter E. Madden (born 1942), American politician and businessman
- Peter Madden (actor) (1904–1976), British actor
- Peter Madden (artist), New Zealand artist, subject of a 2010 exhibition at the Institute of Modern Art in Brisbane, Australia
- Peter Madden (footballer) (1934–2020), English footballer
- Peter Madden (gang leader) (fl. 1910–1914), North American gang leader
- Peter Madden (solicitor) (fl. 1979–present), solicitor in Belfast, Northern Ireland
