= Brian Nelson (Northern Irish loyalist) =

Loyalist paramilitary & British double agent (1949 – 2003)

- Born: 30 September 1947; Belfast, Northern Ireland
- Died: 11 April 2003 (aged 55) England
- Allegiance: Force Research Unit; Ulster Defence Association; UDA West Belfast Brigade
- Conflict: The Troubles

Brian Nelson (30 September 1947 – 11 April 2003) was an Ulster loyalist paramilitary member during The Troubles in Northern Ireland. He was an intelligence chief of the Ulster Defence Association (UDA), and also a clandestine agent for the British Army's Force Research Unit during the conflict.

== Early life ==
Nelson, a Protestant from the Shankill Road, Belfast, served with the Black Watch Regiment before joining the Ulster Defence Association in the early 1970s, where he became a low-level intelligence agent for the Royal Ulster Constabulary (RUC). In 1974 he was jailed for seven years for the kidnap and torture of an Irish man, Gerald Higgins, who died several years later from his injuries. Nelson served three years for the crime. After his release, Nelson resigned from the UDA and left for a construction job in West Germany. In 1985, however, the Government approached him on the basis of his previous military career and requested him to re-enlist with the UDA as a covert Government agent, for a salary of £200 a week, to assist its security agencies to infiltrate the organization to impede its activities. Nelson agreed, and was given the codename '6137' by his handlers. Upon rejoining the UDA, he went on to become its senior intelligence officer, partly with the clandestine assistance from the government. The government's close relationship with Nelson was such, that on one occasion, it is reported to have received from him a suitcase filled with disorganized UDA intelligence that he was having trouble with using administratively, which the Army's Intelligence Corps sifted through, streamlined in an effective systemic manner, and returned to him for use.

== Weapons importation from South Africa ==
In June 1985, Nelson travelled to South Africa in an attempt to procure weapons, after UDA commander Andy Tyrie had made arrangements with a Portadown-born employee of Armscor. Nelson visited an arms factory in Durban, where for the sum of £100,000 he agreed to purchase an initial batch of items consisting of:

- Vektor R4 assault rifles
- Sanna 77 sub machine guns
- Star Model B pistols
- Armsel Striker shotguns
- RPG-7 rocket launchers
- plastic explosives

Nelson informed his FRU handlers of his trip to South Africa on returning to the UK, however the arms deal did not go ahead as the UDA had issues raising the money. A separate successful arms shipment organized by Ulster Resistance from Armscor in South Africa arrived in Northern Ireland in early 1988. Although the arms were sourced in Lebanon, it has been alleged that Armscor funneled the shipment through a series of middlemen (such as American arms dealer Douglas Bernhardt) to disguise its true source.

== Stevens Inquiry ==
In the early 1990s, following the murder of Loughlin Maginn, John Stevens was named to investigate allegations of collusion between loyalist paramilitaries and the Royal Ulster Constabulary (RUC). Stevens was able to use advanced fingerprint technology, then unavailable to the RUC. The Inquiry team uncovered Nelson's fingerprints on some security force documents. The team began an investigation that, despite the obstructions encountered, would lead to Nelson's arrest.

When the Stevens Inquiry Team arrested and interrogated Nelson, he claimed that he had been acting on behalf of the government. Stevens spoke to John Deverell, head of MI5 in Belfast, who confirmed that Nelson had worked for Army Intelligence and not the RUC. Sharp disagreements developed between the two security branches as the extent of Nelson's illegal activities within the Force Research Unit (FRU) was uncovered.

Over a period of two months, Nelson dictated a police statement covering 650 pages. He claimed that he had been tasked by his military handlers with transforming the UDA into a more effective force, particularly at killing. Using information that should have been confidential to his handlers, he produced dossiers or "Intelligence Packages" including backgrounds, addresses, photos and movements on proposed targets, which were passed on to UDA assassins.

=== Blue card index system ===
Nelson had a blue card index system whereby he would pick out information on individuals from the mass of information reaching him. The selection of names for the index was Nelson's alone and Stevens concluded that Nelson was choosing the people who were going to be shot. Nelson passed on the names of only ten people to his FRU handlers, claiming he could not remember the others. Those ten were never targeted. Four others, including solicitor Pat Finucane, were all shot dead. In Stevens' words "the FRU had been inexcusably careless in failing to protect the four who lost their lives". Nelson handed out his blue cards, between twenty and fifty at a time, to members of the Ulster Volunteer Force. The FRU had no agents within the UVF and these targeted people were consequently unprotected. Many loyalists never bothered to destroy their blue cards, however, and the Stevens team was able to obtain fingerprint evidence.

In a March 2001 article for the Andersonstown News, former Force Research Unit operator Martin Ingram claimed that when Brian Nelson was appointed the UDA's intelligence chief in 1987, he handed over their entire cache of targeting files to the FRU, who then updated them with information taken from RUC Special Branch and Military Intelligence files before handing them back to Nelson for use in the planning of assassinations. In 1998, The Sunday Telegraph published a series of articles detailing the activities of the FRU and Brian Nelson's interactions with the unit. Secret documents examined by the newspaper suggested that the specific purpose of running Nelson in the UDA was to ensure that the Loyalist paramilitaries he sourced intelligence for would only target people actively involved in Republican terrorism, instead of indiscriminately murdering Catholics at random. Evidence showed that Nelson was involved in at least 15 murders, 15 attempted murders, and 62 conspiracies to murder during his time as an FRU agent.

In a 2000 interview with the Sunday Herald, an unnamed FRU operator identified Margaret Walshaw as being Nelson's primary FRU handler between 1986 and 1990, and accused her of colluding with him by sourcing maps, photos, and personal details of people to be targeted for assassination. The article further alleged that Walshaw even bought Nelson a personal computer so that information could be more effectively passed to him in floppy disk format, and the chances of him being arrested with incriminating documents could be reduced.

== Trial ==
At his trial in 1992, the prosecution alleged that Nelson failed to alert his handlers to all the assassination plans of which he was aware. Gordon Kerr ("Colonel J"), a senior officer, who was later investigated himself, testified on Nelson's behalf. Kerr claimed that Nelson had warned the Intelligence Corps of more than 200 murder plots by loyalist death squads, including one which targeted Sinn Féin leader Gerry Adams. Kerr claimed that Nelson's warnings allowed the British Army to prevent all murders but three.

Nelson claimed that in 1989 he had warned his handlers of UDA plans to murder solicitor Pat Finucane, who had been successfully representing IRA suspects in court. According to Nelson, Finucane was given no warning and was fatally shot in front of his wife and children. Eventually Nelson pleaded guilty to 20 charges, including five of conspiracy to murder and was sentenced to 10 years imprisonment. A number of charges, including two counts of first degree murder, were dropped as part of his plea bargain.

== Further allegations ==
Following Nelson's conviction, the BBC Panorama programme "Dirty War", broadcast on 8 June 1992, made new claims about Nelson's involvement in further murders and conspiracies. One allegation was that, following a tip off from Nelson, the Intelligence Corps kept secret a plot to murder Paddy McGrory, a solicitor representing the families of the Gibraltar Three.

In January 1993, Gerry Adams claimed the government was fully aware of Nelson's involvement in Ulster Resistance's January 1988 importation of weapons from South Africa including 200 AK47 rifles; 90 Browning pistols; 500 fragmentation grenades and 12 RPG 7 rocket launchers. A different branch of the security forces was able to intercept a large part of the weapons before the Loyalists were able to use them. The weapons which did get through, together with the reliance by loyalists on leaked, although often outdated, military and police intelligence files on potential targets, meant that by 1992 loyalists were killing more than the republicans, a situation not seen since 1975.

== Jimmy Smyth extradition case ==
Sir Patrick Mayhew, Northern Ireland Secretary, declared the Nelson affair was "dead and buried". However, in May 1993, a San Francisco, California judge, in the extradition case of a Maze prisoner escapee, James Joseph "Jimmy" Smyth, who had used the alias "Jimmy Lynch", demanded disclosure in court of suppressed reports, including documents on Nelson, or risk having the case dismissed. The papers were not produced, but Smyth was eventually extradited to Northern Ireland and to jail on 17 August 1996.

== Francisco Notarantonio ==
Nelson was accused of setting up the killing of republican sympathiser, Francisco Notarantonio, aged 66, to divert the UDA away from wrongly targeting "Stakeknife", Freddie Scappaticci, a senior IRA member and informer for the "shadowy" FRU, the army intelligence unit.

Loyalist Sam McCrory killed retired taxi driver and father of eleven children, Notarantonio, who had been interned in 1971. He was shot dead in bed, at his home in Ballymurphy, West Belfast on 9 October 1987.

=== Legacy ===
Loyalist Billy "Twister" McQuiston revealed to journalist Peter Taylor that he and his comrades believed the Stevens Inquiry and the arrest of Brian Nelson did the UDA a favour, declaring "The Stevens inquiry got rid of all the old guard within the UDA and fresher men took over". In its aftermath, Loyalists began out-killing the IRA for the first time in decades.

== Death ==
Nelson died, reportedly from a brain haemorrhage, on 11 April 2003, aged 55, after suffering a heart attack a fortnight before his death. News reports described him as living in a secret location in England.
