= Gordon Kerr (British Army officer) =

British Army officer

- Born: 1948 (age 77–78); Aberdeen, Scotland
- Military career
- Allegiance: United Kingdom
- Branch: British Army
- Service years: 1971–2004
- Rank: Brigadier
- Service number: 490901
- Units: Gordon Highlanders; Intelligence Corps
- Commands: Force Research Unit; Intelligence & Security Group (Germany)
- Conflicts: The Troubles
- Awards: Officer of the Order of the British Empire; Queen's Gallantry Medal; Queen's Commendation for Valuable Service

Brigadier James Gordon Kerr, OBE, QGM (born c. 1948) is a retired senior British Army officer who served as defence attaché to the British embassy in Beijing and was head of the Force Research Unit in Northern Ireland.

== Military career ==
Kerr was born in Aberdeen. His military career began when he was commissioned into the Gordon Highlanders on a Special Regular Commission shortly after leaving university in 1970. He served in Cyprus before his first posting to Northern Ireland in 1972, where he worked as an undercover intelligence officer. Between 1972 and 1987 he worked in a variety of posts related to army intelligence in Northern Ireland, Berlin, and at army training centres in the United Kingdom. He transferred to a Regular Commission in 1974 and transferred to the Intelligence Corps in 1977. He was promoted to lieutenant in 1971, captain in 1974, major in 1980, lieutenant colonel in 1987, colonel in 1993, and brigadier in 1998.

Kerr was awarded the Queen's Gallantry Medal in 1982 and, in 1987, he became head of the Force Research Unit (FRU), a military intelligence unit that ran agents in both Irish republican and Ulster loyalist paramilitary groups. Much controversy stemmed from the amount of military intelligence the FRU gave to the loyalist groups. He was appointed an Officer of the Order of the British Empire in 1991 for "meritorious service in Northern Ireland", and awarded a Queen's Commendation for Valuable Service in 1996.

In October 1997, Kerr was appointed as defence attaché to Beijing. While he was there, his name was published by the Sunday Herald as a consequence of the investigation into the FRU by the Stevens Inquiry. Sir Hugh Orde, former PSNI Chief Constable, said Kerr, as former head of the Force Research Unit, should have been put on trial.

== See also ==
- Martin Ingram
- Pat Finucane
