= List of roles in the British Army =

Roles in the British Army

This is a list of career roles available within each corps in the British Army, as a soldier or officer.

Roles in italics are only available to serving soldiers, or re-joiners, and are not open to civilians.

== Infantry ==
- Infantry soldier
- Infantry officer
- Gurkha
- Paratrooper
- Guardsman
- Guards para
- Ranger
- Pathfinder
- Sniper
- Anti-tank
- Assault pioneer
- Mortarman
- Machine gunner
- Communications information systems
- Reconnaissance

== Royal Armoured Corps ==
- Tank crew
- Armoured cavalry crew
- Light cavalry crew
- Armoured corps officer
- Household Cavalry soldier
- Household Cavalry officer
- Forward air controller
- Farrier

== Army Air Corps ==
- Aviation groundcrew specialist
- Aviation communication specialist
- Aviation support officer
- Officer pilot
- Soldier pilot

== Royal Artillery ==
- Light gunner
- Air defence gunner
- Armoured AS90 gunner
- Missile system gunner
- Uncrewed aerial systems gunner
- Ceremonial gunner
- Artillery surveillance observer
- Artillery logistic specialist
- Artillery command systems
- Artillery officer
- Special observer
- Forward air controller
- Farrier
- Airborne
- Army Commando

== Royal Engineers ==
- Armoured engineer
- Combat engineer
- General fitter
- Geographic technician
- Driver
- Plant operator mechanic
- Logistic specialist
- EOD and search
- Digital communication technician
- Draughtsman electrical and mechanical
- Bricklayer
- Plumber
- Fabricator
- Air conditioning fitter
- Electrician
- Surveyor
- Plasterer and painter
- Design draughtsman
- Carpenter and joiner
- Construction materials technician
- Engineer troop officer
- Army diver
- Airborne
- Army commando

== Royal Corps of Signals ==
- Cyber Engineer
  - Networks Engineer
  - Information Services Engineer
  - Infrastructure Engineer
- Power Engineer
- Electronic Warfare & Signals Intelligence (EWSI)
- Supply Chain Operative
- Royal Signals Officer
- Light Electronic Warfare Teams (LEWT)
- Special Forces Communicator (SFC)
- Special Communicator (SC)
- Airborne
- Army Commando

== Intelligence Corps ==
- Operator military intelligence
- Operator technical intelligence
- Intelligence officer
- Joint Support Group
  - OP Samson (Agent handler)
  - OP Metis (Interrogator)
- Airborne
- Army commando

== Royal Electrical and Mechanical Engineers ==
- Vehicle mechanic
- Recovery mechanic
- Electronics technician
- Aircraft technician
- Technical support specialist
- Avionics technician
- Armourer
- Metalsmith
- Engineering officer
- Airborne
- Army commando

== Royal Logistic Corps ==
- Driver
- Chef
- Logistic supply specialist
- Petroleum operator
- Movement controller
- Driver communications specialist
- Port operator
- Mariner
- Postal and courier operator
- Marine engineer
- Driver air despatch
- Ammunition technician
- Operational hygiene specialist
- Royal Logistic Corps officer
- Army diver
- Army photographer
- Systems analyst
- Driver tank transporter operator
- Driver vehicle support specialist
- Airborne
- Army commando

== Royal Army Medical Service ==
- Combat medical technician
- Environmental health technician
- Biomedical scientist
- Operating department practitioner
- Pharmacy technician
- Radiographer
- Doctor
- Physiotherapist officer
- Pharmacist officer
- Medical support officer
- Environmental health officer
- Healthcare assistant
- Mental health nurse
- Army nurse
- Army nurse officer
- Dentist
- Dental nurse
- UKSF medical support unit
- Airborne

== Royal Army Veterinary Corps ==
- Veterinary technician
- Dog handler
- Veterinary officer

== Royal Army Physical Training Corps ==
- Physical training instructor

== Adjutant General's Corps ==
- HR specialist
- Royal Military Police soldier
- Royal Military Police officer
- HR officer
- Legal officer
- Educational & Training Services officer
- Close protection operative
- Detention specialist
- Army welfare worker
- Military Provost Guard
- Airborne
- Army commando

== Royal Corps of Army Music ==
- Musician

== Royal Army Chaplains’ Department ==
- Chaplain

== Small Arms School Corps ==
- Instructor

== United Kingdom Special Forces ==
- 22nd Special Air Service
- Special Reconnaissance Regiment
