= Joint Support Group =

- Active: Early 2000s -
- Country: United Kingdom
- Branch: British Army
- Type: Military intelligence unit
- Role: Agent handling Clandestine human intelligence Counterterrorism; Espionage; Military intelligence
- Part of: Intelligence Corps
- Mottos: Piscatores Hominum; Fishers of Men
- Engagements: Operation Banner (The Troubles); War on terror; • War in Afghanistan; • Iraq War

The Joint Support Group (JSG) is a covert military intelligence unit of the British Army Intelligence Corps. It was established in the early 2000s as Operation Banner concluded and following the Stevens Inquiry into allegations of collusion between the former Force Research Unit and Protestant paramilitary groups in Northern Ireland.

According to The Daily Telegraph, the JSG was later renamed the Defence Human Intelligence Unit (DHU).

== Role ==
The Joint Support Group is tasked with obtaining human intelligence by recruiting and running sources and by interrogating captured enemy personnel. The JSG works closely with the Security Service, the United Kingdom Special Forces and with friendly foreign nations.

== Deployment in Iraq ==
The Joint Support Group was active during the Iraq War in running Iraqi double agents and worked closely with the Special Air Service and Delta Force as part of Joint Special Operations Command Task Force Black by providing intelligence for counterterrorism operations. The killing of Abu Musab al-Zarqawi in June 2006 and the release of Norman Kember were both reportedly enabled by intelligence obtained by JSG. JSG intelligence also supported Operation Marlborough.

== Deployment in Afghanistan ==
JSG was deployed to the War in Afghanistan and reportedly provided intelligence for the capture of 65 Taliban commanders during the Helmand province campaign.

== Structure ==
JSG consists of a headquarters element, a training wing, and four squadrons. Each squadron contains around 100 operatives.

== Selection and training ==
The Joint Support Group recruits men and women of any rank from the British Army, the Royal Air Force, and the Naval Service up to the age of 42. Volunteers must pass a two-week pre-selection course followed by four months at the Joint Intelligence Training Group at MOD Chicksands.

JSG personnel who are tasked with recruiting and running sources are called agent handlers and their recruitment, selection and deployment is known within the military as OP Samson. The selection and training of interrogators is known as OP Metis. Since the unit was formed, six personnel have been killed on operations.

== See also ==
- Special Reconnaissance Unit
- Military Reaction Force
- Defence Intelligence
- Intelligence Corps
- 1st Intelligence, Surveillance and Reconnaissance Brigade
