= William Stobie =

Irish loyalist quartermaster (1950–2001)

- Stobie leaving court in 2001
- Born: William Stobie; 1950; Belfast, Northern Ireland
- Died: 12 December 2001 (age 51); Glencairn estate, Belfast
- Cause of death: Multiple gunshot wounds
- Organization: Ulster Defence Association
- Known for: Special Branch agent
- Title: Quartermaster

William "Billy" Stobie (1950 – 12 December 2001) was an Ulster Defence Association (UDA) quartermaster and RUC Special Branch informer who was involved in the shootings of student Adam Lambert in 1987 and solicitor Pat Finucane in 1989. His 1990 admissions to journalist Neil Mulholland provided new information which led, in February 1999, to British Irish Rights Watch submitting a confidential report to the British Government. This in turn would lead to the reopening of the Stevens Enquiry, which uncovered state/paramilitary collusion at a level "way beyond" what Sir John Stevens had originally reported.

== Early life ==
Stobie was a native of loyalist west Belfast who joined the UDA for the first time around the time of its foundation in 1971. After a short spell, he left and joined the British Army, serving outside Northern Ireland. Returning to Belfast when his time in the army ended, he rejoined the UDA and served the organisation as an armourer. Stobie had initially applied to join the Ulster Volunteer Force but was rejected by that organisation, which feared that he might be a government agent due to his time in the army, and instead rejoined the UDA, where he joined A Company of the UDA West Belfast Brigade in Highfield.

== Adam Lambert ==
On 8 November 1987, the IRA detonated a powerful bomb at the Enniskillen Remembrance Sunday ceremony killing eleven. There was no immediate direct reprisal, partially as a result of an appeal by Gordon Wilson, father of one of the victims. The exception to this was when Adam Lambert was targeted and shot the following day at a building site in Highfield, Belfast. He was a 19-year-old Protestant student with no criminal record or paramilitary links but was mistakenly assumed to have been a Catholic.

At the Stevens Enquiry ("Overview & Recommendations"), Stobie admitted supplying the guns for the attack and driving Stephen Harbinson in the getaway car. Both Stobie and Harbinson stated they were sickened by the mistake and for the first time Stobie realised that the UDA was unprofessional. Harbinson was also arrested, convicted, and sentenced to life imprisonment. Following his release under the Good Friday Agreement, he skipped bail on drug dealing charges in Northern Ireland. He was rearrested on the Costa del Sol on separate charges of drug trafficking, kidnapping, and arms possession. Once more he was given bail and disappeared.

== Discovery as an informer ==
Stobie's informing did not go unnoticed and in May 1992 he narrowly avoided being killed by other members of the West Belfast Brigade who suspected he was a "tout". At the time Stobie was operating the switchboard at Circle Taxis on the Shankill when their offices were raided by the police and the owners questioned about a taxi that had been ordered to the Glencairn estate. This car had been hijacked by the UVF and used in an abortive operation. West Belfast brigadier Johnny Adair was told by a friend that Stobie had told the police about the incident, and it was decided that he would be shot as an informer.

On the evening of 21 May 1992, Stobie was called to the house of Jackie Thompson on Snugville Street where a party was being held with Adair and fellow UDA members Donald Hodgen, Tommy Potts, and others in attendance. Stobie did not attend so Thompson and Hodgen drove up to his house and dragged him out. They took him to an alleyway where Adair was waiting and, after a struggle, the fleeing Stobie was shot five times in the back and legs. He survived the attack despite his injuries.

== Pat Finucane ==
According to Henry McDonald and Jim Cusack, Stobie provided the gun used to kill Pat Finucane, and they further claimed that once he gave the weapon to the hit team, he called the RUC to let them know that a killing was about to take place. In April 1999, as part of the Stevens Enquiry, Stobie was arrested and charged with Finucane's murder. In June that year, journalist Ed Moloney published Stobie's version of the circumstances of Finucane's death. The charges were later commuted to aiding and abetting the murder. Stobie's trial eventually collapsed because of the failure of Neil Mulholland, by now Northern Ireland Office Press Officer, to take the witness stand.

== Death ==
In 2001, Stobie let it be known that he would be willing to testify at an inquiry into Finucane's killing, stating that he would not name loyalists but would name their RUC "handlers". By declaring that he supported the Finucane family's demand for a public inquiry, he effectively made himself a target for his former UDA comrades.

On 12 December 2001, Stobie was shot dead outside his home at Forthriver Road, Glencairn, Belfast. The Red Hand Defenders (RHD) claimed responsibility. Stobie's killers, who shot him five times, actually belonged to the UDA and were using the Red Hand Defenders as a cover name. In a statement made by a masked paramilitary after the killing, it was claimed: "Billy Stobie could have stayed on the Shankill and been left alone had he not spoken out on Ulster Television and backed the public inquiry [into the Finucane killing]. He betrayed his comrades by doing that and for that reason he paid for his treason".
