= Peter Madden (solicitor) =

Irish solicitor

Peter Madden is an Irish solicitor based in Belfast. He was a founding partner, along with Pat Finucane (1949–1989) of Madden & Finucane Solicitors in 1979, and as of March 2022 is still the managing partner in the firm. The firm is well-known internationally, especially for their work on the Bloody Sunday Inquiry in 1998, nine years after Finucane was murdered by loyalists.

The firm Madden & Finucane Solicitors were the instructing solicitors for the majority of the deceased and wounded at the Bloody Sunday Inquiry called by British Prime Minister Tony Blair in 1998. Madden worked first with Finucane's brother Martin Finucane, and they were later joined by solicitors Ciarán and Fearghál Shiels. By the time the inquiry was called, the firm had already done a huge amount of research, and during the inquiry hired experts to create virtual reality model of the location of the Bloody Sunday massacre on 26 January 1972. In March 2019, it was finally announced as to whether any former soldiers who were at the massacre would face charges as a result of the killings.

Madden was nominated as Human Rights Lawyer of the Year in 2000 by the organisations Liberty and JUSTICE.

Madden was a member of the Law Society Council and chair of the Criminal Law Committee of the Law Society and as of 2009 a member of the Access to Justice Committee and an executive member of the Criminal Bar Association.

He has travelled to South Africa, Colombia, New York City, San Francisco and Israel to investigate, report on or defend people involved in human rights abuses.

== See also ==
- Pat Finucane Centre
