= Jack Dunlap =

US Army soldier and Soviet spy

Jack Edward Dunlap
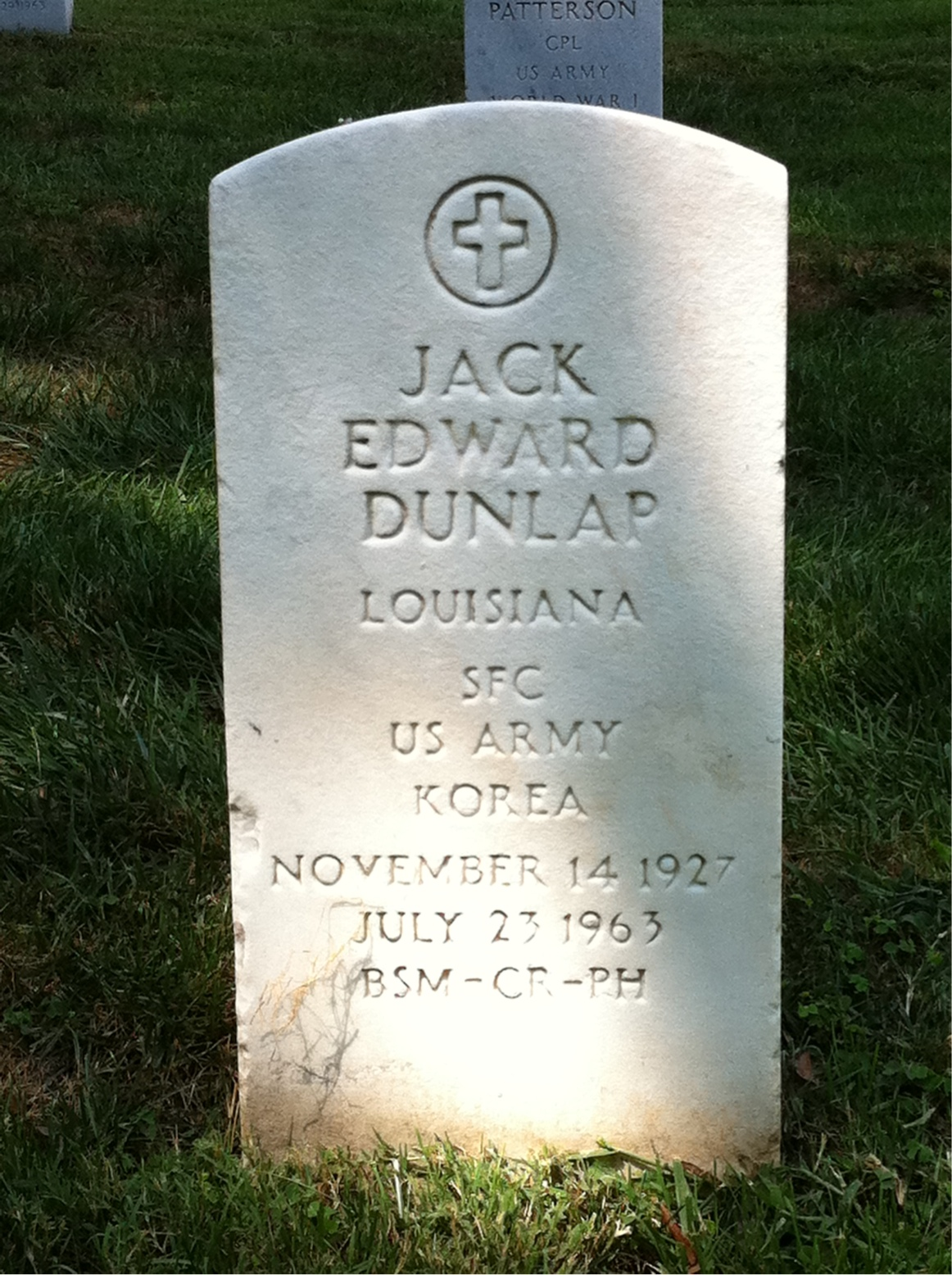
- Grave at Arlington National Cemetery
- Born: November 14, 1927; Bogalusa, Louisiana, US
- Died: July 23, 1963 (aged 35); Anne Arundel County, Maryland, US
- Cause of death: Suicide by carbon monoxide poisoning
- Burial place: Arlington National Cemetery
- Espionage activity
- Service branch: United States Army
- Service years: 1952–1963
- Rank: Sergeant
- Operations: Korean War

Jack Edward Dunlap (November 14, 1927 – July 23, 1963) was a United States Army sergeant stationed at the National Security Agency, and a spy for the Soviet Union in the early 1960s.

Dunlap enlisted in the U.S. Army in 1952 and served with distinction in the Korean War. He was gradually promoted to sergeant and was assigned to the NSA in 1958. He was given top secret messages to carry to NSA officials before they had been encrypted. Moreover, Dunlap was given a top-secret security clearance to view these "plaintext" messages before handing them over to the NSA, and therefore was able to read and make copies of them.

== NSA spying activities ==
Learning of Dunlap's sensitive position, a KGB agent approached him in 1958, bluntly offering him to be "paid handsomely" for the contents of the pouches he was carrying. Before delivering the documents, Dunlap slipped them under his shirt, drove to a meeting point in Washington, D.C., had his contact make copies or photograph them, then returned them to the pouch and made his delivery. It was later estimated that Dunlap was receiving from the Soviets between $40,000 and $50,000 a year. When neighbors asked about his new riches, Dunlap said that he had inherited a plantation in Louisiana. NSA security paid no attention to Dunlap's new lifestyle. In 1963, he was about to be transferred to another post, which would cut off his access to documents. To continue making money from the Soviets, Dunlap believed that he could stay on at NSA by simply not re-enlisting when his tour of duty expired.

As an army sergeant assigned to the NSA, he was not subject to a polygraph examination. When he retired from the Army, his Soviet handlers told him to apply for a civilian position, which he did. He was given a polygraph examination by NSA on a Friday and while he passed the examination, the examiner told the FBI there was something that made him uneasy and told Dunlap to come back on Monday. Dunlap killed himself over the weekend by carbon monoxide poisoning.

The Director of Security for NSA told FBI agents that he and his assistant paid a visit to Dunlap's widow to offer their condolences, and she said, "You probably want his papers", showing them classified material. That was when the NSA realized Dunlap had been a spy. Dunlap was a personable individual and roamed around within NSA. One secretary told the FBI that he stopped at her desk to chat and would see papers in her out box and tell her he was headed in that direction and take the papers. He would stop at a Xerox machine on the way and make a copy for the Soviets.

His activities were reported to have been the cause of the downfall of Oleg Penkovsky.

As a United States Army veteran, Dunlap was buried at Arlington National Cemetery.

== Bibliography ==
- Bamford, James (1982). The Puzzle Palace. Penguin Books. pp. 196–200.
