= Pat Finucane =

Irish lawyer (1949–1989)

- Finucane in the mid-1980s
- Born: Patrick Finucane; 21 March 1949; Belfast, Northern Ireland
- Died: 12 February 1989 (aged 39); Belfast, Northern Ireland
- Occupation: Human rights lawyer
- Known for: Murder by Ulster loyalists in 1989
- Spouse: Geraldine Finucane (m. 1970)
- Children: 3, including John

Patrick Finucane (/fɪˈnuːkən/; 21 March 1949 – 12 February 1989) was a lawyer from Belfast, Northern Ireland. He was known for challenging the British government in human rights cases on behalf of Irish Republican Army (IRA) hunger strikers in the 1980s. He was murdered by loyalist paramilitaries from the Ulster Defence Association (UDA), acting in collusion with British security services.

Finucane's killing was one of the most controversial during the Troubles in Northern Ireland. He was shot 14 times while eating at his Belfast home with his three children and his wife, who was wounded during the attack. In September 2004, a UDA member who was recruited as an informer by the Royal Ulster Constabulary's Special Branch pleaded guilty to his murder, serving three years in jail.

In 2001, after international pressure, the British government agreed to appoint a judge to review whether or not there was collusion with the British government in the murder; a public inquiry was promised if collusion was found. However, even though the judge did find evidence of collusion, the British government reneged on the promise for a public inquiry. In October 2011, instead of a public inquiry, the government began a less wide-ranging review led by Sir Desmond de Silva. The results of this review, released in December 2012, acknowledged that the case entailed "a wilful and abject failure by successive Governments" and blame was laid on dead witnesses and now-defunct military organisations; the Finucane family decried the report as a "sham". In December 2012, British Prime Minister David Cameron apologised for the collusion. In 2024, the government of Northern Ireland announced that a public inquiry would be carried out.

== Early life and family ==
Patrick Finucane was born on 21 March 1949 into a prominent republican family on Falls Road, Belfast. He was the eldest child of eight, with six brothers—John, Liam, Gerard, Seamus, Martin and Dermot—and a sister, Rosaleen. In August 1969, at the start of the Troubles, his family was forced out of their home between Shankill Road and Falls Road, Belfast. He graduated from Trinity College Dublin in 1973. One of his brothers, John who was a Provisional Irish Republican Army (IRA) member, was killed in a car crash on Falls Road in 1972. Another brother, Dermot, successfully contested attempts of extradition to Northern Ireland from the Republic of Ireland for his alleged part in the killing of a prison officer; he was one of 38 IRA prisoners who participated in the Maze Prison escape in 1983. A third brother, Seamus, was the fiancé of Mairead Farrell, one of the participants killed in Operation Flavius by the Special Air Service (SAS) in Gibraltar in March 1988. Seamus was the leader of an IRA unit in west Belfast before his arrest in 1976 with Bobby Sands and seven other IRA men, during an attempt to destroy Balmoral's furniture store in south Belfast. He was sentenced to 14 years' imprisonment.

== Career ==
After graduating, Finucane apprenticed at the law firm of Oliver Kelly. In 1979, he formed Madden & Finucane Solicitors, with Peter Madden, which is still led by Madden, and continues to act for those it considers to have been victims of mistreatment by the state, or their survivors.

In 1981, Finucane represented IRA prison leader Bobby Sands and Irish National Liberation Army hunger strikers who later died during the 1981 Irish hunger strike. He also represented Brian Gillen and three men shot dead by the Royal Ulster Constabulary (RUC) in a shoot-to-kill incident in 1982. In 1986, he represented Brenda Downes, the widow of John Downes, a civilian killed by a plastic bullet during an anti-internment rally in Belfast. In 1988, he represented Pat McGeown, who was charged in connection with the Corporals killings.

== Murder and investigations ==
In the early hours of 25 August 1987, Colour Sergeant John Fletcher of the Ulster Defence Regiment raided the armory of Palace Barracks in Holywood, County Down, and transferred weapons and ammunition into a van before driving it out of the barracks. Among the items stolen were a pair of Bren light machine guns and eleven Browning Hi-Power 9mm pistols. Fletcher then drove to the Cavehill Road in Belfast and sold the arms cache to UDA members for £3,000. On 17 November 1988, UDA quartermaster William Stobie, who was also a RUC Special Branch agent, was handed a Browning Hi-Power for servicing. Stobie took note of the gun serial number (No. BL67A 4931), then field stripped and oiled the pistol before returning it. Stobie reported the incident to his RUC handlers a few days later and subsequent enquiries matched the pistol's serial number to the batch that was stolen from Palace Barracks. On 6 February 1989, Stobie was requested to provide the same Browning Hi-Power pistol for an upcoming attack. After he transferred the weapon on 12 February 1989, Stobie warned his RUC handlers that it was to be used imminently against a "top PIRA man".

At around 7:00 pm on 12 February 1989, UDA members hijacked a Ford Sierra mini-cab in Glencairn and drove it to a safe house where members of a hit team were waiting. Ken Barrett, who was also an RUC Special Branch agent, then drove the mini-cab to the Antrim Road area, with two UDA gunmen as passengers. The hit team arrived at the Finucane family home on Fortwilliam Drive at 7:30 pm. While Barrett waited in the car, the two gunmen kicked down the front door of the house, with the help of a sledgehammer, and ran inside. They entered the kitchen where Finucane had been having a Sunday meal with his family and immediately opened fire with a 9mm pistol and a .38 revolver, shooting him twice and knocking him to the floor. Then, while standing over him, the leading gunman fired 12 bullets into his face at close range. Finucane was clutching his fork when he died. The UDA team then drove to the Woodvale area where the getaway car was dumped, then went to a UDA safe house in Highfield to change clothes and destroy forensic evidence linking them to the shooting. On 4 July 1989, a 9mm pistol, with the same serial number as the Browning Hi-Power reported by Stobie to his RUC handlers, was recovered by authorities on the Shankill Road and a forensic firearm examination proved it was the same pistol used in the murder of Pat Finucane.

Finucane's wife, Geraldine, was slightly wounded in the shooting attack which was witnessed by their three children who hid underneath the table. The RUC immediately launched an investigation into the killing. The senior officer heading the Criminal Investigation Department team was Detective Superintendent Alan Simpson, who set up a major incident room inside the RUC D Division Antrim Road station. Simpson's investigation ran for six weeks and he later stated that from the beginning, there had been a noticeable lack of intelligence coming from the other agencies regarding the killing. Finucane's killing was widely suspected by human rights groups to have been perpetrated in collusion with officers of the RUC and, in 2003, the British Government Stevens Inquiries found that the killing was indeed carried out with the collusion of police in Northern Ireland.

The Ulster Defence Association/Ulster Freedom Fighters (UDA/UFF) claimed they killed the 39-year-old lawyer Finucane because he was a high-ranking officer in the IRA. Police at his inquest said they had no evidence to support this claim. Finucane had represented republicans in many high-profile cases, but he had also represented loyalists. Several members of his family had republican links, but the family strongly denied Finucane was a member of the IRA. Informer Sean O'Callaghan has stated that he attended an IRA finance meeting attended by Finucane in Letterkenny in 1980.

In Finucane's case, both the RUC and the Stevens Inquiries found that he was not a member of the IRA. Republicans have strongly criticised the claims made by O'Callaghan in his book The Informer and subsequent newspaper articles. One Republican source says O'Callaghan "has been forced to overstate his former importance in the IRA and to make increasingly outlandish accusations against individual republicans."

=== Later investigations ===
Rosemary Nelson, a lawyer who was murdered in 1999, also worked hard to obtain an independent inquiry into the murder of Finucane.

In 1999, the third inquiry by John Stevens into allegations of collusion between the security forces and loyalist paramilitaries concluded that there was such collusion in the murders of Finucane and Brian Adam Lambert. As a result of the inquiry, RUC Special Branch agent and loyalist quartermaster William Stobie, a member of the UDA, was later charged with supplying one of the pistols used to kill Finucane, but his trial collapsed because he claimed that he had given information about his actions to his Special Branch handlers. The pistol belonged to the UDA, which until August 1992 was a legal organisation under British law. A further suspect, Brian Nelson, was a secret agent who was part of the Force Research Unit. He had provided information about Finucane's whereabouts and claimed that he had alerted his handlers about the planned killing.

In 2000, Amnesty International demanded that the then Secretary of State for Northern Ireland, Peter Mandelson, open a public inquiry into events surrounding his death. In 2001, as a result of the Weston Park talks, the Cory Collusion Inquiry was established; retired Canadian Judge Peter Cory was appointed by the governments of Britain and Ireland to investigate the allegations of collusion by British and Irish security forces in the killing of Finucane, the Killing of Robert Hamill, the killings of Harry Breen and Bob Buchanan in the 1989 Jonesborough ambush, as well as other killings during the Troubles. Cory reported in April 2004 and recommended public enquiries be established including the case of the Finucane killing. The hard drives of Cory's inquiry were wiped by MI5 "in the interests of national security" in 2002.

In 2004, Ken Barrett pleaded guilty to Finucane's murder. His conviction came after a taped confession to the police, lost since 1991, re-surfaced.

In June 2005, then Irish Taoiseach Bertie Ahern told Mitchell Reiss, United States Special Envoy for Northern Ireland, that "everyone knows" the UK government was involved in the murder of Pat Finucane. On 17 May 2006, the United States House of Representatives passed a resolution calling on the British government to hold an independent public inquiry into Finucane's killing.

==== Initial investigations ====
A public inquiry was announced by the British Government in 2007, but Finucane's family criticised its limited remit and announced that they would not co-operate. In 2012, Amnesty International reiterated its call for an independent inquiry and called on members of the British judiciary not to serve on the inquiry should it be held under the terms of the 2005 Inquiries Act.

Finucane's widow, Geraldine, wrote letters repeating this request to all the senior judges in Great Britain and took out a full-page advertisement in The Times newspaper to draw attention to the campaign. In June 2007, it was reported that no members of the security forces would be charged in connection with the killing.

On 11 October 2011, members of the Finucane family met with Prime Minister David Cameron at 10 Downing Street. Following the meeting, Finucane's son Michael said that he and the family had been "genuinely shocked" to learn that the Cory recommendation of a public enquiry, previously accepted by Tony Blair, would not be followed and that a review of the Stevens and Cory case files would be undertaken instead. Geraldine Finucane described the proposal as "nothing less than an insult...a shoddy, half-hearted alternative to a proper public inquiry". Finucane's wife Geraldine declared in court papers that Cameron stated at the meeting that: "It is true that the previous administration could not deliver a public inquiry and neither can we. There are people in buildings all around here who won't let it happen." The following day, the official apology was given publicly in the House of Commons by the Secretary of State for Northern Ireland, Owen Paterson.

Based on conversations she had had with Peter Cory, Finucane's widow subsequently claimed that Margaret Thatcher, UK Prime Minister at the time of the murder, "knew exactly what was going on". She claimed that Cory had told her that he had seen papers marked 'for cabinet eyes only' and they involved collusion and the killing of her husband.

==== de Silva report ====
On 12 December 2012, the government released the Pat Finucane Review, the results of the inquiry conducted by Sir Desmond Lorenz de Silva. The report documented extensive evidence of State collaboration with loyalist gunmen, including the selection of targets, and concluded that "there was a wilful and abject failure by successive governments to provide the clear policy and legal framework necessary for agent-handling operations to take place effectively within the law."

Prime Minister David Cameron acknowledged "shocking levels of collusion" and issued an apology. However, Finucane's family denounced the De Silva report as a "sham" and a "suppression of the truth" into which they were allowed no input.

In May 2013, state documents dated 2011 disclosed through the courts revealed that David Cameron's former director of security and intelligence, Ciaran Martin, had warned him that senior members of Margaret Thatcher's government may have been aware of "a systemic problem with loyalist agents" at the time of Pat Finucane's death but had done nothing about it.

==== 2015 lawsuit ====
In late 2015, three former RUC officers, Trevor McIlwrath, Johnston Brown and Alan Simpson, filed suit in the High Court in Belfast against the Police Service of Northern Ireland (PSNI), alleging that, to cover up a conspiracy, the PSNI obstructed their investigation into the murder in violation of the European Convention on Human Rights. The lawsuit alleged that a senior RUC official told Simpson, who headed the investigation, not to get "too deeply involved in this one." Simpson further alleged that a senior Special Branch official who told Simpson during the investigation that he knew nothing, was revealed by the De Silva report to actually have been privy to significant information.

==== Independent public inquiry ====
In February 2019, the Supreme Court of the United Kingdom ruled in agreement with the Finucane family, finding unanimously that the UK had failed to uphold article 2 of the European convention on human rights, which among other things obliges signatories to adequately investigate state-caused deaths. On 12 October 2020, the Northern Ireland Secretary, Brandon Lewis, committed to reach a decision on or before 30 November 2020 on whether a public inquiry would be held into the murder. The British Labour Party urged the UK Government to "act without delay" in the setting up of "an independent public inquiry".

On 26 November 2020, 24 members of the United States Congress urged the government of Boris Johnson to set up a public inquiry into the murder of Pat Finucane. Both Republicans and Democrats accused the UK government of 'breach of faith' in the case. Four days later, Lewis rejected calls for a public inquiry, citing ongoing PSNI and police ombudsman's reviews, despite the Chief Constable of the PSNI insisting that no new evidence had come to light. Mr. Lewis stated that "now is not the time" for a public inquiry, potentially leaving the door open for an inquiry in future. Sinn Féin, the SDLP, the Alliance Party and the Green Party sent a joint letter to Lewis, calling his decision an insult to Finucane's family.

On 11 September 2024, Secretary of State for Northern Ireland Hilary Benn announced that an independent public inquiry would be ordered under the Inquiries Act 2005 into the murder of Pat Finucane, due to the "exceptional reason" that several previous UK governments had committed to holding such an inquiry into his death. Although the announcement was welcomed by civil rights groups, the decision was criticised by some, such as the Democratic Unionist Party leader Gavin Robinson, who said that it "perpetuates a hierarchy and sends the message that this murder was more deserving of investigation than others".

== Legacy ==
The Pat Finucane Centre named in his honour, is a human rights advocacy and lobbying entity in Northern Ireland.

In February 2014, a mural honoring Finucane was completed in west Belfast.

A portrait of Finucane was painted by Robert Ballagh; it was displayed in Washington, D.C. and New York in 2011.

== Personal life ==
In 1970, Finucane married Geraldine, whom he met at Trinity College. She is the daughter of middle-class Protestants; together they had three children. His son John is a Sinn Féin politician who was elected as Lord Mayor of Belfast in May 2019 and was elected MP for Belfast North in December 2019.

Finucane was also a footballer and played as a striker in the Irish League for Crusaders and Lisburn Distillery.
