= Andersonstown News =

Northern Irish newspaper

- Type: Weekly newspaper
- Owner: Belfast Media Group (formerly known as the Andersonstown News Group)
- Founded: 1972; 54 years ago
- Language: English
- City: Belfast
- Country: Northern Ireland
- Sister newspapers: South Belfast News
- Website: belfastmedia.com

Andersonstown News, also known as Andytown News, is a weekly newspaper owned by the Belfast Media Group published on Wednesdays in Belfast, Northern Ireland, which focuses on news and issues in west Belfast.

Founded in 1972, it was published twice-weekly (Monday and Thursday) until 2011, when the Monday edition was "axed".

In 2016, prior to the newspaper reducing publication frequency, the Audit Bureau of Circulations reported that the Andersonstown News had an average circulation of 8,457 for the Monday edition and 16,453 for the Thursday edition

The North Belfast News, previously published separately, was combined with the Andersonstown News in 2022 in one newspaper due to rising costs. The South Belfast News is also part of the Belfast Media Group. A former newspaper in the group, the Daily Ireland, was published between early 2005 and September 2006. An Irish language paper, Lá (also known as Lá Nua) was also previously associated with the group.

== See also ==
- List of newspapers in Ireland
