= Stevens Inquiries =

1989–2003 British inquiries on Northern Ireland

The Stevens Inquiries were three official British government inquiries led by Sir John Stevens concerning collusion in Northern Ireland between loyalist paramilitaries and the state security forces. While Stevens declared in 1990 that collusion was "neither wide-spread nor institutionalised", by April 2003 he acknowledged that he had uncovered collusion at a level "way beyond" his 1990 view. Much of Stevens' evidence was obtained from advanced fingerprint techniques to link people to documents. By 2005 the team had identified 2,000 people from their prints with a further 1,015 sets of prints outstanding.

== Stevens 1 ==
=== Loughlin Maginn ===
In September 1989 RUC chief constable, Sir Hugh Annesley, ordered the initial enquiry about the circumstances following the August 1989 death of Loughlin Maginn. Maginn, a 28-year-old Catholic, was shot by the Ulster Defence Association (UDA) at his home in Lissize, near Rathfriland. Although Maginn had no paramilitary connections, the UDA claimed he was a Provisional Irish Republican Army (IRA) intelligence officer. In an attempt to prove the accuracy of their targeting, the UDA published security force documents and a video of police intelligence. (It was later found that the video had been provided by sympathetic soldiers using equipment supplied by UDA double agent Brian Nelson).

=== Obstruction ===
Stevens would later claim in a book he wrote that from the investigation's outset there was a concerted campaign to discredit the inquiries among elements of the British media. He also claimed that when he enquired with the British military authorities on whether or not a dedicated Intelligence Corps unit operated in Northern Ireland, he was told that there were no such units currently operating there. Stevens later discovered that the Force Research Unit (FRU) was indeed operating in Northern Ireland when senior RUC officers blamed the unit for an arson attack at his Inquiry headquarters.

Following their discovery of the then-unknown Brian Nelson's fingerprints on security documents, the Inquiry team encountered a wall of silence as they tried to investigate further: Brian Fitzsimmons, Acting Head of the RUC's Special Branch, became evasive, telling Stevens: We can't help you with this man; and, at the Grosvenor Road station, Nelson's card in the intelligence card system was initially whipped away from the investigators. However, the team persevered and gathered enough fresh evidence to plan a secret operation to arrest Nelson on Monday 10 January 1990.

Stevens went home the weekend before the planned arrest. As he returned to Belfast on the Sunday afternoon, there were two journalists on the plane; they informed him that they had been sent over to cover the raids. It was obvious that there had been a leak, and it was decided to postpone the operation for 24 hours. In the meantime, Nelson escaped to England.

That night there was a fire at the team's incident room within the 17-acre (69,000 m^{2}) secure complex at Sea Park, the RUC's Carrickfergus Headquarters. The main team had left at 9pm but four members unexpectedly returned 25 minutes later to find the room alight. Neither the smoke alarm nor the heat sensors had gone off and the telephone lines had been cut. They made an attempt to tackle the fire but found that there was no water in the fire protection system.

== Stevens 3 ==
=== William Stobie ===
In April 1999, as part of the Inquiry, William Stobie was arrested and charged with the murder of solicitor Pat Finucane. In June that year, as agreed, journalist Ed Moloney published Stobie's version of the circumstances of Finucane's death.

=== Overview & Recommendations Report ===
The "Stevens Enquiry 3", Overview & Recommendations, report was released on 17 April 2003. The report found that members of the security forces in Northern Ireland colluded with the UDA during the paramilitary's killing of Catholic civilians in the 1970s and 1980s, including the solicitor Pat Finucane in 1989. The security forces units accused of colluding with the UDA included the FRU and the Royal Ulster Constabulary Special Branch.

Stevens required three police inquiries, during which time his offices within RUC headquarters suffered an arson attack.

Stevens noted, under "Obstruction of my Enquiries":

There was a clear breach of security before the planned arrest of Brian Nelson and other senior loyalists. Information was leaked to the loyalist paramilitaries and the press. This resulted in the operation being aborted. Nelson was advised by his FRU handlers to leave home the night before. A new date was set for the operation on account of the leak. The night before the new operation my Incident room was destroyed by fire. This incident, in my opinion, has never been adequately investigated and I believe it was a deliberate act of arson.

Stevens concluded:

4.6 I have uncovered enough evidence to lead me to believe that the murders of Patrick Finucane and Brian Adam Lambert could have been prevented. I also believe that the RUC investigation of Patrick Finucane's murder should have resulted in the early arrest and detection of his killers.

4.7 I conclude there was collusion in both murders and the circumstances surrounding them. Collusion is evidenced in many ways. This ranges from the willful failure to keep records, the absence of accountability, the withholding of intelligence and evidence, through to the extreme of agents being involved in murder.

4.8 The failure to keep records or the existence of contradictory accounts can often be perceived as evidence of concealment or malpractice. It limits the opportunity to rebut serious allegations. The absence of accountability allows the acts or omissions of individuals to go undetected. The withholding of information impedes the prevention of crime and the arrest of suspects. The unlawful involvement of agents in murder implies that the security forces sanction killings.

4.9 My three Enquiries have found all these elements of collusion to be present. The co-ordination, dissemination and sharing of intelligence were poor. Informants and agents were allowed to operate without effective control and to participate in terrorist crimes. Nationalists were known to be targeted but were not properly warned or protected. Crucial information was withheld from Senior Investigating Officers. Important evidence was neither exploited nor preserved.

Under "Other Matters concerning Collusion", Stevens noted:

2.17 My Enquiry team also investigated an allegation that senior RUC officers briefed the Parliamentary Under Secretary of State for the Home Department, the Rt Hon Douglas Hogg QC, MP, that 'some solicitors were unduly sympathetic to the cause of the IRA'. Mr Hogg repeated this view during a debate on the Prevention of Terrorism legislation in the House of Commons. Within a few weeks Patrick Finucane was murdered. Mr Hogg’s comments about solicitors' support for terrorism made on 17 January 1989 aroused controversy. To the extent that they were based on information passed by the RUC, they were not justifiable and the Enquiry concludes that the Minister was compromised.

2.18 A further aspect of my Enquiry was how the RUC dealt with threat intelligence. This included examination and analysis of RUC records to determine whether both sides of the community were dealt with in equal measure. They were not.

=== Aftermath ===
Loyalist "Twister" Billy McQuiston revealed to journalist Peter Taylor that he and his comrades believed the Stevens Inquiry and the arrest of Brian Nelson did the UDA a favour, declaring "The Stevens inquiry got rid of all the old guard within the UDA and fresher men took over". In its aftermath, Loyalists began out-killing the IRA for the first time in decades, leading up to the eventual ceasefires and Good Friday Agreement.
