= RUC Special Branch =

Special Branch of the Royal Ulster Constabulary

RUC Special Branch was the Special Branch of the Royal Ulster Constabulary, and was heavily involved in the British state effort during the Troubles, especially against the Provisional Irish Republican Army. It worked closely with MI5 and the Intelligence Corps. The RUC came under criticism for its handling of its agents within paramilitary organisations, including from other RUC officers. Appointed in 1984 to investigate claims of a RUC "shoot-to-kill" policy, former Deputy Chief Constable of Greater Manchester Police John Stalker said that he "had never experienced...such an influence over an entire police force by one small section" in regard to Special Branch.
