= Billy Elliot (UDA) =

Northern Irish Protestant paramilitary (fl. 1971-1988)

- Born: William Elliot
- Military career
- Allegiance: Ulster Defence Association (UDA)
- Rank: Brigadier
- Unit: East Belfast Brigade
- Conflict: The Troubles

William Elliot was a former Northern Irish loyalist who served as brigadier of the Ulster Defence Association's (UDA) East Belfast Brigade in the 1980s.

== Ulster Defence Association ==
Elliot joined the loyalist paramilitary organisation the Ulster Defence Association (UDA) shortly after its formation in September 1971, having become an umbrella organisation for various loyalist vigilante groups. These groups had sprung up in loyalist Protestant areas such as Woodvale, Shankill and east Belfast in the wake of The Troubles ostensibly to protect their communities against nationalist attacks.

By 1972, Elliot was already a colonel in the UDA and led a unit in east Belfast. He also acted as bodyguard to the formidable East Belfast brigadier Tommy Herron. Herron was kidnapped and shot dead in September 1973 by unidentified UDA rivals during an internal feud. Earlier Elliot's name had been mentioned in court as having established a UDA group within a secondary school when one of the pupils was found in possession of a handgun. It subsequently emerged that Elliot had set up a unit of 19 schoolboys, most of whom were members of the proto-spide "tartan gangs" that gathered in loyalist housing estates in the early 1970s.

He ran as the Ulster Loyalist Democratic Party (ULDP) candidate in the August 1981 council by-elections. Although he was not elected, he garnered more than one thousand votes, 38 per cent of the total votes cast, against stalwart Ulster Unionist Party (UUP) and Democratic Unionist Party (DUP) candidates. The ULDP, a loyalist party founded in June 1981 by the UDA, was led by the high-profile South Belfast brigadier, John McMichael.

== East Belfast brigadier ==
Sometime in the 1980s, but before 1986, he succeeded Sammy McCormick as East Belfast brigadier and became a member of the UDA's ruling Inner Council. In 1986, in his role as brigadier, he represented the UDA at a meeting which was held at the DUP headquarters in Albertbridge Road with political leaders James Molyneaux and Ian Paisley, of the UUP and DUP, respectively. The meeting was convened to discuss a planned one-day strike to be carried out by the "Ulster Says No" committee in protest against the 1985 Anglo-Irish Agreement; while Elliot spoke on behalf of the UDA, David Ervine represented the Ulster Volunteer Force (UVF).

Elliot was one of many prominent UDA members arrested for possessing classified security documents during the John Stevens Inquiry into collusion between loyalist paramilitaries and the Northern Ireland security forces. As a result, he was suspected by his UDA associates of being a police informer. Elliot still held the rank of brigadier at this stage. However his position became more untenable when the seizure of a large UDA arms cache by the authorities followed his release from police custody, adding fuel to the rumours that he was a police informer. Elliot had been critical of Andy Tyrie's leadership of the UDA for some time, feeling that Tyrie was too interested in intellectualising loyalism and eventually Tyrie identified Elliot as a potential rival and sought to bring about his downfall. Elliot was ostracised by other brigadiers and he began to fear that he would meet the same fate as powerful Shankill Road racketeer and UDA fundraiser James Craig who was killed in October 1988 by the Ulster Freedom Fighters (UFF) for allegedly helping the Provisional IRA to assassinate John McMichael. Elliot promptly left east Belfast as well as the UDA and was later reported to have turned to religion. His retirement left a power vacuum within the organisation, but this was soon filled by the volatile Ned McCreery who assumed command of the East Belfast Brigade in his place.

Other offices
Preceded by Sammy McCormick	Ulster Defence Association East Belfast Brigadier; 1980s	Succeeded by Ned McCreery
