= Ned McCreery =

Northern Irish loyalist

Edward "Ned" McCreery (c. 1945 – 15 April 1992) was a Northern Irish loyalist. A leading member of the Ulster Defence Association (UDA), he was notorious for the use of torture in his killings. He was leader of the UDA East Belfast Brigade for several years at a time when the brigade was at its most active. He later fell out of favour with other high-ranking UDA figures and was killed by unidentified members of the organisation.

McCreery came from a well-known east Belfast family that produced a number of leading loyalists as well as footballers, including his cousin David McCreery.

== Rise to prominence ==
McCreery was a founder-member of the UDA in 1971. Holding the rank of colonel in the UDA, McCreery sat on the group's Inner Council in the early 1970s. According to Henry McDonald and Jim Cusack, McCreery was responsible for the murders of at least six Catholic civilians in 1972 and also launched a grenade attack on a busload of Catholic workers. His gang became notorious, along with the groups led by John White and Davy Payne, for pioneering the use of torture in their murders, something that was new to Northern Ireland at the time. In this role McCreery co-operated closely with Albert "Ginger" Baker, a Belfast-born British soldier and UDA volunteer.

McCreery's name was also mentioned in connection with the killing of Tommy Herron in 1973. According to one theory the two had a long-running dispute over money that ended when McCreery used a woman to lure Herron into a deadly ambush. The theory remains unproven and is one of a number of competing ideas, as Herron's death remains unsolved. Following the introduction of internment in 1971, McCreery was one of the first UDA members to be taken into custody.

== Imprisonment and trial ==
In 1973, Albert Baker decided to leave the organisation after becoming disillusioned with killing. Baker turned himself into the Royal Ulster Constabulary and agreed to testify against a number of UDA leaders, including McCreery. Baker's evidence saw McCreery and six others brought to trial for the torture and murder of James McCartan on 3 October 1972. However, Baker's evidence proved incoherent and was tailored in an attempt to minimise his own involvement, resulting in the judge dismissing the case and McCreery going free. McCartan had been kidnapped from the lobby of the Park Avenue Hotel, Holywood Road and tortured at two separate Newtownards Road UDA clubs (on Finmore Street and Clermont Lane) before being shot dead. According to the evidence presented, McCreery had directed the torture but had left the shooting to Baker, preferring to remain behind and drink at the Clermont Lane club.

Whilst being held, McCreery was part of a Camp Council that met from time to time in the Maze and in which issues affecting prisoners in the compound were discussed. The Council was established by Ulster Volunteer Force leader Gusty Spence and Provisional IRA members Proinsias MacAirt and Billy McKee, to which UDA representatives McCreery and James Craig as well as Official IRA and Irish National Liberation Army representatives were added.

McCreery was released on 17 February 1974, prompting celebrations in his native East Belfast that quickly escalated into a riot. A gun battle between the UDA and the British Army followed and UDA member Kirk Watters and local non-combatant Gary Reid, a cousin of footballer George Best, were both shot and killed by soldiers. Eventually Sammy McCormick, recently appointed East Belfast brigadier, called a halt to the mayhem and over the coming weeks instilled a discipline within the ranks of his brigade that had previously been lacking in the area. McCreery was then interned without trial along with two other men involved in the Baker trial.

== Later years and killing ==
McCreery remained an active figure in loyalist paramilitarism and, according to author Ian S. Wood, was probably one of those who killed a Protestant, Margaret Caulfield, in Ballysillan on 7 May 1986 after interrogating her and her Catholic husband in their house. Rumours also circulated at the time that McCreery had been known to indulge in bestiality. During the 1980s he began to take more of a role in the racketeering side of the movement. Towards the end of the decade he began to garner a reputation within the movement for corruption and greed, a trait shared by his old ally Craig. By this time his base was the Avenue One bar on Templemore Avenue, which he owned. He had risen to the rank of Brigadier of the East Belfast UDA, following the resignation of Billy Elliot. This made him effectively one of the six leaders of the movement.

However, by the early 1990s, McCreery's position within the UDA became less secure. In 1991 his cousin had been shot and wounded by UDA colleagues, an attack that left McCreery embittered, and shortly before his death McCreery had a fight with another UDA member, beating him soundly. An internal UDA inquiry in the early 1990s determined that McCreery was also a police agent and claimed that he had even passed on information about fellow UDA members to Irish republicans. McCreery's close links to Craig, who had been killed in 1988 following similar claims, as well as the persona non grata Tommy Lyttle sealed his fate, and a death sentence was passed on McCreery by the new UDA leadership in early 1992. He was shot and killed outside his home on Grahamsbridge Road, Dundonald on 15 April 1992. He was 46 years old. The killing was claimed by the UDA's Special Assignment Section, which had first appeared in 1988 when it claimed Craig's murder.

== Aftermath ==
Following his death, an "Ulster Freedom Fighters" (UFF) statement described McCreery as an "enemy of Ulster" and accused him of being a leading figure within the illegal drugs trade. No convictions were ever made for McCreery's killing although his relatives and supporters within the East Belfast UDA blamed Geordie Legge, another leading figure in the east of the city and a major internal rival of McCreery. In 1997 Leonard McCreery, Ned's brother, attacked Legge with a knife, inflicting grievous wounds on Legge. Despite clinically dying twice on his way to the hospital, Legge survived the attack and Leonard McCreery was sentenced to eleven years in prison for attempted murder. Legge, who is described by Ian S. Wood as having served as brigadier of East Belfast, eventually fell foul of McCreery's ultimate successor Jim Gray and was violently killed in Gray's "Bunch of Grapes" pub in January 2001. Gray was also believed to have issued the order to kill McCreery.

Leonard McCreery's son Leon also became active in the UDA but in 1999 fled Belfast after being attacked by rivals from the group. In the course of the knife attack he sustained wounds that required 63 stitches and 17 staples. Leon McCreery settled in Stockport where he would later come to prominence as the head steward for the far-right English Defence League.

Other offices
Preceded by Billy Elliot	Ulster Defence Association East Belfast Brigadier; 1980s–1992	Succeeded by Jim Gray
