= Cherryvalley =

Former electoral ward in Northern Ireland

- Electoral ward
- Location within the United Kingdom
- Coordinates: 54.588°N 5.852°W
- Country: United Kingdom
- Division: Northern Ireland
- City: Belfast

Cherryvalley is a former electoral ward of Belfast City Council, Northern Ireland.

Along with neighbouring Stormont and Malone in south Belfast, Cherryvalley is considered one of Northern Ireland's most affluent and exclusive residential areas with average house prices reaching £2–3 million. Cherryvalley was also an electoral ward of East Belfast which was created in 1985 in order to reduce the electorates of the neighbouring Stormont and Shandon wards.

The residents of the area have long been the subject of jest in Northern Ireland, being seen to talk with an affected posh accent. This was popularised by the comedian James Young with his "Cherryvalley Lady" sketch, comparable to the English Hyacinth Bucket.

During World War II German prisoners of war were interned in the area, on the site now occupied by the headquarters of the Police Service of Northern Ireland.

In 2005 a property in the area, which was owned by estate agent Philip Johnston and rented by UDA member Jim Gray, was the subject of a PSNI investigation into money laundering.

== 2001 Census ==
On Census Day (29 April 2001) the resident population of Cherryvalley ward was 5933. Of this population:

- 18.3% were under 16 years old and 28.3% were aged 60 and above;
- 45.6% of the population were male and 54.4% were female; and
- 86.4% of the average household incomes exceeded £65,100.
- 8.9% were from a Catholic Community Background and 85.1% were from a 'Protestant and Other Christian (including Christian related)' Community Background.

For more details see: NI Neighbourhood Information Service
