= Ginger Baker (loyalist) =

British Ulster loyalist

- Born: Albert Walker Baker c. 1951 (age 74–75); Belfast, Northern Ireland
- Occupations: Soldier with the Royal Irish Rangers regiment, British Army
- Known for: Ulster Defence Association (UDA) member, convicted murderer, and Northern Ireland's first loyalist Supergrass

Albert Walker "Ginger" Baker (born c. 1951) is an Ulster loyalist who was convicted of four murders carried out by the Ulster Defence Association (UDA), of which he was a leading member. He turned himself in to the police in 1973 after throwing a hand grenade into a bus transporting Catholic workmen in East Belfast, Northern Ireland, which killed one man. He admitted to this killing and those of three other Catholics the previous year, as well as 11 armed robberies. He was sentenced to 25 years imprisonment for the four murders.

Baker claimed he was a British intelligence agent and member of the Military Reconnaissance Force (MRF). He gave evidence against his former UDA associates, including Ned McCreery, in the murder trial of the "romper room" torture and killing of James McCartan on 3 October 1972. This made him Northern Ireland's first loyalist supergrass. Although McCreery had assisted in the torture of McCartan, Baker had actually carried out the shooting. Baker's testimony, however, proved inconsistent and was given with the aim of minimising his own role in the killing, so the judge dropped the charges against McCreery and the others. McCreery was also involved in the grenade attack.

Baker contacted the Stevens Inquiry team in 1989 and alleged that the security forces assisted in the majority of loyalist paramilitary attacks in the 1970s by providing the UDA and Ulster Volunteer Force (UVF) with the necessary intelligence to facilitate them. He confirmed that loyalist paramilitaries had perpetrated the 1974 Dublin and Monaghan bombings and stated that "half the assassinations in Northern Ireland in the early 1970s would not have been committed without RUC backing". Whilst in prison, he was interviewed by Labour MP Ken Livingstone; an edited transcript of their meeting appears in his book Livingstone's Labour.

== British Army ==
Albert Wallace Baker, known as "Ginger" after the drummer in the British rock group Cream, was born into a Protestant family in East Belfast, Northern Ireland. In 1970, at the age of 19, he joined the 2nd Battalion of the British Army's Royal Irish Rangers (R Irish) regiment. He trained with the US Special Forces and was a member of the Special Air Service's (SAS) 22nd Regiment. He served briefly in Oman, where he was involved in suppressing the Dhofar Rebellion. Baker deserted in July 1972 and returned to Belfast. He had acquired an English accent during his time in the British Army.

== Ulster Defence Association ==
Upon his return to Belfast, Baker joined the UDA, which was the largest loyalist paramilitary organisation in Northern Ireland during the Troubles. He joined the organisation long before it was proscribed in 1992. Baker was accepted into the movement and quickly became prominent as he possessed his own military firearm and had the ability to train other young members. According to journalist Martin Dillon, Baker "strutted around the streets of his native east Belfast with a swagger and assuredness lacking in other paramilitary men who did not have an army training". As a leading member of the UDA, Baker participated in a total of 11 armed robberies and four sectarian killings; the first robbery taking place just a month after his return. Along with three other UDA accomplices, he held up the Vulcan Bar on the Newtownards Road, brandishing a .45 pistol and stealing the sum of £821 which Baker regarded as "pocket money". He quickly acquired a reputation for brutality. Rated highly by the local UDA leader Tommy Herron, he served as Herron's personal bodyguard for a time. He also acted as bodyguard for members of the UDA's ruling body, the Inner Council. Whenever it held meetings, usually inside an East Belfast hotel, Baker would patrol the premises carrying a firearm.

=== Killings ===
He was the ringleader of a UDA unit in his native east Belfast known as the "Romper Room Gang" which included Ned McCreery, who held the rank of Colonel within the UDA. This unit was described by journalist Maeve Connolly as having been as "repugnant as the Shankill Butchers".

On 18 August 1972, the unit carried out the first of four sectarian killings. Baker shot 21-year-old barman Philip Fay five times in the head on the doorstep of his home in Island Street. Fay, who was a native of County Cavan and who had a limited understanding of the sectarian divide in Belfast, answered the door to Baker and confirmed his religion when asked if he was a Catholic. Baker then opened fire. Fay had worked at the Girton Lodge Hotel, one of the locations used for UDA Inner Council meetings and as part of his job he had served drinks to the UDA leaders whilst they met. Herron had ordered Fay's killing when he found out he was a Catholic, fearing that he might have heard sensitive information at the meetings, although in fact Fay had no links whatsoever to republicans.

This was followed a month later by the killing of another Catholic barman, Paul McCartan (52), who was abducted by the unit and brought to a UDA "romper room" for a "rompering". These notorious UDA "romper rooms" had been invented by UDA brigadier Davy Payne in the early 1970s. They were located inside disused buildings, lock-up garages or rooms above pubs and drinking clubs. Once inside, a victim would be "rompered" (brutally beaten and tortured), and then killed. After other members of the unit savagely beat McCartan, Baker then shot him to death. According to a Royal Ulster Constabulary (RUC) report, members of a foot patrol had stopped a drunk McCartan as he walked along the Newtownards Road shortly before his abduction but had let him pass after he refused a lift home. However, Baker would later claim that the police had picked him up and had left him off just fifty yards away from where they knew the UDA gang was waiting.

In early October, James McCartan, a 21-year-old forklift driver from The Markets (no relation to Paul), was abducted from the lobby of the Park Avenue Hotel on the Holywood Road after a party. McCartan's friend John Jamison, a Protestant, had attempted to get him away from the gang but he was beaten as was McCartan's girlfriend and as Baker bundled him into the vehicle he yelled at Jamison "he's a Fenian bastard". He was brought to several UDA "romper rooms" located in UDA clubs in the Newtownards Road area - specifically in Finmore Street and Clermont Lane. McCartan was then stripped naked, hung up by the ankles and subjected to lengthy torture sessions at each club which included being beaten with a pickaxe handle, stabbed 200 times, and his head dropped down onto the concrete floor. The romperings were allegedly presided over by McCreery, and when they had concluded, McCartan was hooded, bundled in a car and taken to waste ground beside the Connswater River off Mersey Street where Baker shot him three times, killing him.

Tim Pat Coogan alleged that Baker was an active participant in the brutal torture. According to testimony at the subsequent trial, the UDA drinking club in Clermont Lane opened during the rompering with several UDA members and their girlfriends arriving to drink and watch. McCartan's body, which was unrecognisable, was found on 3 October on the waste ground where he had been killed. Baker would later claim that McCartan was a wanted republican although, again, he had no paramilitary connections.

On 1 February 1973, Baker and McCreery mounted an attack on a bus which was transporting Catholic workmen in Kingsway Park, Dundonald, East Belfast. After Baker got the bus to slow down when he affected a limp crossing the street, he lobbed a hand grenade inside the vehicle, mortally wounding Patrick Eugene Heenan (47), a married man from Andersonstown with five children. Heenan had been a foreman on the construction site of a Catholic school in East Belfast. He died after receiving a fatal gash to an artery in his leg. Several of his co-workers on the bus gave statements to the RUC.

== Prison and collusion claims ==
During the spring of 1973, a series of street battles between members of the UDA and the British Army occurred in east Belfast. Herron had expected Baker to assume a leading role in these conflicts but the former soldier maintained a conspicuously low profile, a fact which led some of his fellow UDA members to hint that Baker might be an informer. Not long after this (again, the exact date is unknown) Baker became "sickened and disgusted" by the UDA's activities and returned to his former regiment in England. Upon his return, he was court-martialled and discharged; then on 31 May 1973 he turned up at Warminster police station where he told police that he wished to confess his role in the UDA. He told Sergeant Anthony Godley that he had been involved in four murders and 11 robberies and wished to make a statement to that effect, although he cautioned initially that he would not reveal the names of any of his accomplices and was only interested in his own role in the attacks. He was subsequently questioned in Salisbury and Belfast before being charged and remanded in custody at Crumlin Road gaol.

Baker was the first person to be tried in a non-jury Diplock Court. He pleaded guilty to four murders and on 15 October 1973 was sentenced to twenty five years imprisonment, with his sentence to be served outside Northern Ireland. In the course of the trial it emerged that Baker had joined the UDA for the money that was available in UDA circles. In the James McCartan murder trial held in February 1974, Baker agreed to testify against McCreery and six other UDA members, making him Northern Ireland's first loyalist supergrass. He claimed the RUC had offered him Special Category Status in exchange for his testimony.

However, the evidence Baker provided was tailored with the aim of minimising his own role in the killing, and therefore was inconsistent and often incoherent. He had claimed that McCreery and the six other accused men had tortured McCartan inside the club and one of them had then ordered Baker to shoot him dead. The trial judge, Sir Robert Lowry deemed Baker's evidence as "manifestly unreliable", and as a result, the judge dropped charges against McCreery and the other six men. Baker spent ten years of his sentence in solitary confinement. In the late 1980s he was on the same cell block as the Birmingham Six.

Whilst in prison, Baker began a letter writing campaign to the press making a series of allegations about collusion between the security forces and loyalist paramilitaries. He alleged that, far from being a deserter, his UDA activity had actually been sanctioned by the British Army and he added that the deputy commander of his UDA unit was also a member of the RUC. He was questioned by detectives regarding his allegations, although no further action was taken. Father Denis Faul, one of those Baker had written to, visited Baker in Frankland Prison to hear the details of his claims to having been a British Intelligence agent involved in collusion, as did the Daily Mirror journalist Paul Foot. He was also alleged to have worked for the Military Reconnaissance Force (MRF). According to Baker, his MRF handler was an officer in the Parachute Regiment and that during his time in the UDA, Baker lived at the officer's home in Holywood, outside Belfast. He also claimed that one of the RUC men who escorted him out of the court after he was given his twenty-five year sentence had been one of the same policemen who had previously supplied him with guns.

Ken Livingstone, at the time a Labour Party Member of Parliament (MP), conducted some of the most in-depth published interviews with Baker in July 1988. Amongst the claims Baker made in these interviews was that RUC officers had given weapons directly to Baker and members of his gang and that he regularly visited Mountpottinger RUC station in the Short Strand to collect guns. He also alleged that the group had planned to attack the Red Lion bar near the Albert Clock, where their target was to be a leading republican but that a police Land Rover had chanced by. The hit was abandoned but the guns were given to a police detective who was waiting in a civilian car in a nearby carpark. From here, Baker claimed, the detective drove the weapons back to East Belfast where he returned them to Baker and his men. Baker stated that "half the assassinations in Northern Ireland in the early 1970s would not have been committed without RUC backing". An edited transcript of Livingstone's meeting with Baker was published in his book Livingstone's Labours. In 1989, Baker contacted the John Stevens Inquiry team with his allegations.

He claimed that the 1972 and 1973 Dublin bombings were carried out by the UDA, and that one of the bombers was a member of the UDA's Inner Council. His brother told journalist Frank Doherty of the Sunday World that Baker had delivered the explosives used in the 1 December 1972 Eden Quay and Sackville Place bombings from Eglington, County Londonderry to a unit of the Belfast UDA, which had then driven the cars down to Dublin. Two men were killed and 131 people injured in these two city centre explosions. Journalist Joe Tiernan contradicted Baker's claims, however, and instead alleged that the attacks were executed by the Ulster Volunteer Force (UVF). According to Baker's brother, Baker had taken part in another cross-border bombing in Donegal.

Baker also confirmed that the May 1974 Dublin and Monaghan bombings, which killed 33 civilians, were perpetrated by loyalist paramilitaries. Two units from the UVF's Belfast and Mid-Ulster brigades had in fact carried out the three Dublin carbombings whilst another unit from the Mid-Ulster Brigade executed the Monaghan attack. The UVF Mid-Ulster Brigade was commanded at the time by Billy Hanna, a sergeant in the Ulster Defence Regiment (UDR) who also allegedly organised the four attacks and had links to British intelligence. On 15 July 1993, the UVF released a statement in which it admitted to having carried out the 1974 bombings. According to the Irish News, the Irish Government had requested the British Government for permission to speak with Baker in prison about the attacks, for which nobody has ever been charged. At the time the carbombings took place on 17 May 1974, Baker was already serving his prison sentence.

After serving 18 years of his sentence, Baker was released from prison in 1992. That same year, his former associate Ned McCreery was shot dead by the UDA for being an alleged informer. Since his release from prison, Baker has made no further allegations against the Northern Ireland security forces.

== Bibliography ==
- Dillon, Martin (1991). The Dirty War. Random House
- Dillon, Martin (2003). The Trigger Men. Edinburgh: Mainstream Publishing.
- Holroyd, Fred & Burbridge, Nick (1989). War Without Honour. Hull: Medium Publishing
- McDonald, Henry & Cusack, Jim (2004). UDA - Inside the Heart of Loyalist Terror. Dublin: Penguin Ireland.
- Wood, Ian S. (2006). Crimes of loyalty: a history of the UDA. Edinburgh: Edinburgh University Press.
