= Philip Johnston =

Philip Johnston may refer to:

- Philip Johnston (entrepreneur) (born 1986), co-founder and CEO of Starcloud
- Philip Johnston (New Jersey soldier) (died 1776), colonel of the New Jersey militia who died at the Battle of Long Island
- Philip Johnston (code talker) (1892–1978), proposed the idea of using the Navajo language as a code in World War II
- Phillip Johnston (born 1955), American avant-garde jazz saxophonist
- Philip W. Johnston (1944–2025), Massachusetts politician
- Philip Johnston (estate agent) (1966–2017), estate agent from Belfast, Northern Ireland
- Philip Mainwaring Johnston (1865–1936), British architect and architectural historian
- Phil Johnston (filmmaker) (born 1971), American filmmaker and voice actor

== See also ==
- Phil Johnston (disambiguation)
- Phillip Johnson (disambiguation)
