= Sammy McCormick =

Northern Irish loyalist

- Born: Samuel McCormick
- Military career
- Allegiance: Ulster Defence Association (UDA)
- Rank: Brigadier
- Unit: East Belfast Brigade
- Conflict: The Troubles

Samuel McCormick was a Northern Irish loyalist who served from 1973 until the 1980s as the brigadier for the Ulster Defence Association's (UDA) East Belfast Brigade. He had taken over the command following the shooting death of its former leader Tommy Herron.

== East Belfast UDA brigadier ==
In September 1973, powerful East Belfast leader Tommy Herron was kidnapped and subsequently shot dead during an internal Ulster Defence Association (UDA) feud. Although Andy Tyrie was the UDA's commander, there was intense rivalry between Herron and former UDA leader (and the organisation's founder), Charles Harding Smith. Upon Herron's killing, McCormick was appointed to succeed him as leader of the East Belfast Brigade. He was viewed as a disciplinarian with a bland, colourless personality. This suited the UDA leadership who felt that he presented a staid, responsible image in direct contrast to the flamboyantly corrupt Herron. He was a loyal supporter of Tyrie and when Harding Smith placed Tyrie under house arrest in his Glencairn home McCormick arranged for the UDA Chairman to be moved across Belfast to a new house in the east of the city.

His tenure as brigadier got off to an uneasy start. In February 1974, following UDA colonel Ned McCreery's release from internment, there was a raucous celebration held by him and his supporters which immediately escalated into a riot. The volatile McCreery and his men waged a gun battle in the streets of east Belfast against the Royal Ulster Constabulary (RUC) and British Army, resulting in the deaths of two men. One of the dead men, civilian Gary Reid, was a cousin of footballer George Best. McCormick, however, resolutely gained the upper hand by clamping down on the rioters. He soon restored order from the earlier mayhem, and under his stern command, the formerly chaotic brigade became one of the most disciplined units in the entire UDA.

McCormick was arrested in 1982, along with leader Andy Tyrie, South Belfast brigadier John McMichael, and several other UDA associates. The RUC had seized documents at the UDA headquarters which contained the names and addresses of senior law enforcement and judiciary figures. The case against McCormick was never brought to trial. Andy Tyrie was the only person out of those arrested who was actually tried in court. The case subsequently fell apart when the defence argued that the UDA headquarters was used by many people, therefore it could not be shown with any degree of certainty as to whom the documents actually belonged. McCormick stood down as East Belfast brigadier sometime in the 1980s and was replaced by Billy Elliot.

Other offices
Preceded by Tommy Herron	Ulster Defence Association East Belfast Brigadier; 1973–1980s	Succeeded by Billy Elliot
