= Billy Hull =

Northern Irish loyalist activist

William Hull (born 1912, date of death unknown) was a loyalist activist in Northern Ireland. Hull was a leading figure in political, paramilitary and trade union circles during the early years of the Troubles. He is most remembered for being the leader of the Loyalist Association of Workers, a loyalist trade union-styled movement that briefly enjoyed a mass membership before fading.

== Early years ==
A native of Belfast, Hull came from the Shankill Road, a staunchly loyalist and working class area in the west of the city. Hull was well known for his heavy build, and he was said to weigh as much as twenty stone. He was a member of the Orange Order.

Hull worked at the Harland & Wolff engine shop in Belfast, and became the convenor of shop stewards there. A supporter of working class and trade union politics, Hull became a member of the Northern Ireland Labour Party in 1948. He maintained his membership of the party until the early 1970s, when he resigned in protest at the Northern Ireland policy of the Harold Wilson government and the British Labour Party.

== Loyalist activism ==
Hull was also active in loyalist paramilitarism and around 1970 he helped to establish the Workers' Committee for the Defence of the Constitution (WCDC), a loyalist trade union of which he was joint leader along with Hugh Petrie of Short Brothers. In February 1971, he led a march of 9,000 shipyard workers to demand the introduction of internment in the aftermath of the 1971 Scottish soldiers' killings. Hull's march was one of the major factors in the resignation of James Chichester-Clark as Prime Minister of Northern Ireland.

In 1971 he founded the Loyalist Association of Workers (LAW), which campaigned against the abolition of the Parliament of Northern Ireland and which replaced the earlier WCDC. He felt that the LAW could harness the "power of the [loyalist] grass roots", which he felt had been taken for granted by unionist politicians up to that point. The group, which combined an interest in working class issues with an anti-Catholic agenda and support for inequality, has been characterised by David McKittrick as presenting a syncretic form of "sectarian socialism". Hull warned of the results of a British abandonment of Northern Ireland: "If we're sold down the drain, there wouldn't be a civil war. There would be armed rebellion against the government of Britain." The group claimed as many as 100,000 members at its peak and Hull helped to organise a 48-hour strike as a response to the introduction of direct rule. This however was to prove the zenith of the LAW for Hull disagreed with other leading figures over strategy soon afterwards and the movement collapsed, with the bulk of the membership decamping to the Ulster Workers' Council.

=== UDA ===
In 1971 Hull had co-operated closely with Jim Anderson in helping to organise a local "defence association" of vigilantes in the mid-Shankill area. This group was swiftly merged with a number of similar like-minded groups to form the Ulster Defence Association (UDA) and from 1972 to 1973 Hull would serve as a member of the UDA's Inner Council, the name given to a group of prominent members who met regularly to decide the direction of the movement. Hull was prominent in the early years of the UDA and in 1972 was one of three members, along with Tommy Herron and Davy Fogel, to meet Secretary of State for Northern Ireland William Whitelaw at Parliament Buildings to discuss the growing problem of violence at interface areas in Belfast. In November of the same year he also accompanied Herron on a trip to Canada where the pair hoped to present the loyalist case and develop links with groups representing Northern Irish emigrants.

== Political career ==
In 1972, Hull was a prominent founder-member of the Ulster Vanguard. With William Craig confirmed as leader, Hull became one of his most prominent and visible lieutenants alongside the Reverend Martin Smyth and Captain Austin Ardill. He subsequently stood for its successor, the Vanguard Unionist Progressive Party in North Belfast at the 1973 Northern Ireland Assembly election, but took only 852 votes and was not elected. Along with Herron, Bill Snoddy and Tommy Lyttle, Hull's performance represented a near total routing for the Vanguard's UDA candidates, although Glenn Barr was elected in Derry to prevent a total wipeout. The trade union backgrounds of Hull and Barr had helped to persuade Craig to include the word "Progressive" in his party's name in the first place.

Following his own disappointing showing, Hull contemplated turning the LAW into a new, working class loyalist party, but this was fiercely opposed by Vanguard leader William Craig. This suggestion, along with Hull's background in the Northern Ireland Labour Party began to see his credentials as a loyalist questioned and his support erode. The LAW collapsed, with many of its members forming the Ulster Workers Council.

== Later years ==
In 1974, Hull was shot and injured in an attack which Conflict Archive on the Internet states was carried out by other loyalist paramilitaries, possibly the Ulster Volunteer Force. Henry McDonald and Jim Cusack however state that the shooting was the work of the Provisional Irish Republican Army who wanted to take down two high-profile UDA members, even if they had little involvement in the group's military activities. Steve Bruce also states that it was the work of IRA members from Ardoyne, although a false claim was made to the BBC that it had been carried out by the Ulster Young Militants. Hull had been in the Crumlin Road glazier shop belonging to Jim Anderson when a gunman entered and shot both men.

By the time of this attack, Hull's role with the UDA had diminished considerably. With the LAW having also disappeared, Hull would play little role in public life from then on.
