= Michael Stone (loyalist) =

Loyalist terrorist during The Troubles

- Born: 2 April 1955 (age 71); Harborne, Birmingham, England
- Organisation: Ulster Defence Association
- Criminal charges: 3 counts of murder (Milltown Cemetery attack); 13 later charges, including 5 counts of attempted murder
- Criminal penalty: 684 years' imprisonment (released under licence for 6 years); 16 years' imprisonment 18 years' imprisonment
- Spouses: Marlene Leckey (m. 1976; div. 1983) Leigh-Ann Shaw (m. 1985, divorced)
- Children: 9

Michael Anthony Stone (born 2 April 1955) is a British former militant who was a member of the Ulster Defence Association, a loyalist paramilitary group in Northern Ireland. He was convicted of three counts of murder committed at an IRA funeral in 1988. In 2000, he was released from prison on licence under the Good Friday Agreement. In November 2006, Stone was charged with the attempted murder of Martin McGuinness and Gerry Adams, having been arrested attempting to enter the parliament buildings at Stormont while armed. He was convicted and sentenced in 2008 to 16 more years' imprisonment, before being released on parole in 2021.

== Early life ==
Stone was born in Harborne, Birmingham, to English parents, Cyril Alfred Stone and his wife Mary Bridget (née O'Sullivan). Mary Bridget walked out on the marriage soon after Stone's birth; subsequently, his father enlisted in the Merchant Navy. Stone was raised by his paternal aunt and her husband, John and Margaret Gregg, who lived in Ballyhalbert. Stone has claimed that he suspects his biological mother may have been a Catholic because of her name but added that he was baptised in the Church of Ireland by the Greggs and as such he has always self-identified as Protestant. Cyril Stone subsequently remarried and had a boy and a girl, Michael Stone's half-siblings, by his second wife. The Greggs had five biological children with whom Stone was raised and whom he identifies as siblings, a son and four daughters.

The Greggs moved to the Braniel estate on the outskirts of Belfast in 1959 due to John Gregg securing employment at the Harland and Wolff shipyard. Stone attended Braniel Primary School and Lisnasharragh Secondary School, where fellow pupils included George Best, who was in the same class as Stone's sister. Stone enrolled in the Army Cadet Force as a fourteen-year-old, receiving basic training in firearm use. Stone was expelled from school aged fifteen after a series of playground fights and left Lisnasharragh with no formal qualifications. He found work as a "hammer boy" in the shipyard a few weeks later. However, he got into a fight with another worker and, following a suspension, resigned from his job.

== Move to loyalism ==
In 1970, Stone helped establish a Braniel street gang, which called itself the Hole in the Wall Gang, and which Stone claims included Catholic and Protestant members. Gang members, who adopted a form of uniform consisting of blue jeans and oxblood Dr. Martens and who carried knives, clashed regularly with members of other Braniel gangs as well as those from neighbouring estates in east Belfast. In 1971, Stone joined a "Tartan Gang" that had started up on the Braniel estate and he was soon recognised as "general" of this loyalist group. The gangs were responsible for sectarian violence, which usually took the form of spending Saturday afternoons in Belfast city centre attacking Catholic youths, and vandalising the Catholic repository in Chapel Lane.

Stone met Tommy Herron, commander of the Ulster Defence Association (UDA)'s East Belfast Brigade, when Herron moved into the Braniel estate in 1972. According to Stone, Herron took him and three friends to the neighbouring Castlereagh Hills one day and brought a German Shepherd dog with them. After the four had played with the dog for around half-an-hour, Herron produced a gun and told them to kill the dog. After his three friends refused, Stone shot the animal and was praised by Herron for being ruthless. He was sworn in as a member of the UDA at a ceremony the following week. Stone was trained in weapon use by Herron himself for several months. According to Stone, at one point in the training Herron shot him with a blank round from a shotgun.

Stone's early UDA activity was mostly confined to stealing. In 1972, he was sent to prison for six months for stealing guns and ammunition from a Comber sports shop. He returned to jail soon after his release, for stealing a car. Tommy Herron was murdered, probably by colleagues, soon afterwards and the Braniel UDA went into abeyance.

== Red Hand Commando ==
Following Herron's death, Stone withdrew from the UDA and in January 1974 attached himself to the Red Hand Commando (RHC), a loyalist group that also operated a Braniel unit under Sammy Cinnamond. According to Stone, one of his earliest duties was acting as a bodyguard to Vanguard Unionist Progressive Party leader Bill Craig. In 1978, the UDA encouraged Stone to join the Royal Irish Rangers at Ballymena, in order that he could receive training with anti-tank weaponry, although he did not receive this training and left after six months. According to Martin Dillon, Stone also held membership of Tara, an anti-Catholic and anti-communist organisation led by William McGrath, a close associate of RHC leader John McKeague. Dillon also argues that Stone had actually joined the RHC at an earlier date and held simultaneous membership of the other groups, Tara and the UDA. Cross-membership of more than one loyalist group was not unheard of in the early days of the Troubles.

Stone became close to John Bingham, the commander of the Ballysillan Ulster Volunteer Force (UVF, which the RHC was very close to), and the two worked closely on a fund-raising drive for their groups. According to Stone, this included a meeting with two members of Mossad, who wished to provide funding to the UVF. Stone however was eager to become more closely involved in killing. Under Cinnamond that was not on the agenda, so he drifted from the RHC.

== Return to Ulster Defence Association ==
In 1984, Stone decided to reactivate his membership of the UDA and contacted Andy Tyrie to receive permission. After a brief period with the near moribund Mid-Ulster Brigade, Stone, who felt he was too well known in east Belfast to rejoin the local brigade, met John McMichael and was soon seconded to his South Belfast Brigade. McMichael soon provided Stone with guns and placed him in a team whose ostensible purpose was to fill McMichael's hit list, a list of high-profile Irish republican targets the Brigadier wanted killed. His first target was Owen Carron, who actually was a high-profile republican. Stone trailed Carron for several weeks but on the day he was due to kill the Sinn Féin activist, Stone was tipped off that the Royal Ulster Constabulary (RUC) knew about the plan and were approaching, so the hit was abandoned.

On 16 November 1984, Stone committed his first murder when he shot and killed Catholic milkman Patrick Brady, a man Stone claimed was a member of the Provisional IRA. According to the Conflict Archive on the Internet, although Brady was a member of Sinn Féin, he was not in the IRA. This was followed in 1985 by an attempt to kill another Sinn Féin activist, Robert McAllister, but on this occasion Stone was unsuccessful. He subsequently killed Kevin McPolin in November 1985 and would also face charges for the murder of Dermot Hackett in 1987. Stone would subsequently admit to killing McPolin but has claimed that he did not kill Hackett but confessed to his murder in order that a young UFF member might escape punishment. Both McPolin and Hackett were uninvolved Catholics.

== Milltown Cemetery attack ==
On 16 March 1988, Stone staged a single-handed attack on a collective Provisional IRA funeral being held at Milltown Cemetery in West Belfast for three IRA members - Sean Savage, Daniel McCann and Mairéad Farrell - shot dead ten days earlier by the Special Air Service in Gibraltar. As the coffins were being buried, Stone, who had entered the mourning crowd pretending to be a part of it, attacked the assembly with multiple RGD-5 grenades and gunfire from two handguns. He killed three people, including IRA member Caoimhín Mac Brádaigh, also known as Kevin Brady, and injured sixty others.

After a subsequent foot chase through the cemetery grounds, with Stone throwing hand grenades and firing at his pursuers, he was caught and overpowered. He was beaten and there was an attempt to kidnap him using a car before the RUC arrived on the scene and forced the crowd off of Stone, who was now semi-conscious from the beating, and arrested him. He still walks with a slight limp as a result of his thigh bone being dislocated during the attack.

According to UDA member Sammy Duddy, two UDA brigadiers from two Belfast battalions, fearing IRA reprisals against themselves or the areas they controlled, telephoned the IRA after the Milltown attack, denying knowledge of Stone or his intentions. The two brigadiers both claimed that Stone was a "rogue loyalist" acting without UDA sanction or authorisation. Duddy, however, described Stone as "one of the UDA's best operators".

Stone, who apparently objected to the newspapers' portrayal of him as a mad Rambo-style gunman, also confessed to shooting dead three Catholics between 1984 and 1987. He claimed the victims were linked to the IRA, although it appears that they were not. At his trial, he pleaded not guilty but refused to offer any defence. Convicted of six murders, he was sentenced to life imprisonment with sentences totalling 684 years, with a recommendation he serve at least thirty years.

While in the Maze Prison, Stone became one of the five leaders of the Ulster Defence Association/Ulster Freedom Fighters prisoners. Alongside the other four, he met Mo Mowlam during the 1998 negotiations between the government and paramilitaries as part of the Northern Ireland peace process. He also collaborated with Martin Dillon on a book about his life, entitled Stone Cold.

== Release and subsequent activity ==
On 24 July 2000, Stone was released from prison after 12 years under the terms of the Good Friday Agreement. He then lived in East Belfast, London and Spain with his girlfriend Suzanne Cooper until 2006. Stone has nine children from his first two marriages.

After leaving prison, Stone concentrated on work in the community and being an artist, a hobby he began in the Maze. His paintings are vivid and not so much political as topical. They fetch between a few hundred and a few thousand pounds each. In 2004, a biography, None Shall Divide Us, was published, in which Stone claimed he had received "specialist assistance" from RUC operatives in carrying out the cemetery killings. The jacket he wore during the Milltown Cemetery attack was auctioned at a Scottish loyalist club for £10,000. The publishing of None Shall Divide Us and a second book was one of the reasons given as to why legislation preventing criminals from profiting from publications about their crimes should be passed. A consultation resulted in legislation being passed as part of the Coroners and Justice Act 2009.

In March 2002, it was reported in the Sunday Life that Stone and Cooper had fled Northern Ireland for France following death threats from loyalists opposed to the peace process. The aim of those behind the threats, reported as being from the Orange Volunteers, was the eventual destruction of the Good Friday Agreement and the end of Northern Ireland's troubled peace process. Following time in Birmingham, Stone returned to East Belfast.

Stone was featured in the BBC2 television series Facing the Truth mediated by Archbishop Desmond Tutu where he met relatives of a victim of loyalist violence. Sylvia Hackett talked with Stone, who was convicted of murdering her husband Dermot, a Catholic delivery man, in order to clear her husband's name: the UDA had claimed he was in the IRA. Although he previously admitted to the murder, Stone told his victim's widow that he had no direct responsibility, having been withdrawn after planning the attack, and refused to confirm that Dermot had not been in the IRA.

In November 2006, he claimed that in the 1980s he had been "three days" away from killing the then leader of the Greater London Council and former Mayor of London, Ken Livingstone, over his invitations to Sinn Féin's Gerry Adams and Martin McGuinness to visit him in London. The plot was reportedly cancelled over fears it had been infiltrated by Special Branch detectives.

== Stormont arrest ==
On 24 November 2006, at 11:16, Stone was arrested for attempting to enter Parliament Buildings at Stormont armed with an imitation Beretta 92FS pistol, a knife and a "viable" bomb, after placing eight "pipe bombs" within the grounds of Stormont. Three civilian security guards disarmed him as he entered the building, by trapping him within the revolving doors of the main lobby entrance. The security guards were injured during the struggle with Stone. Following the security breach, the building was evacuated and a British Army Bomb Disposal Unit was called to examine the suspect device. Before entering the building he had scrawled an incomplete graffito stating "Sinn Féin IRA mur[derers]" on the Parliament building. Later examination from the bomb squad revealed that the bag Stone had been carrying contained between six and eight viable explosive devices. Sir Hugh Orde, the Chief Constable of the Police Service of Northern Ireland, said "their potential for death, destruction and injury is being assessed" but added they were "fairly amateurish". As a result of Stone's actions, talks between political parties about power-sharing and the election of a First Minister, which had only just resumed, had to be abandoned.

On 19 December 2006, Stone's defence lawyer, Arthur Harvey, QC, claimed that the Stormont incident was not intended to endanger the life of anyone. "It was, in fact, a piece of performance art replicating a terrorist attack", claimed Harvey. During his trial in September 2008 on 13 charges, including the attempted murder of Gerry Adams and Martin McGuinness, Stone repeated that his actions were "an act of performance art".

Secretary of State for Northern Ireland Peter Hain indicated that Stone's licence for release under the Good Friday Agreement would be revoked, and the full 638-year sentence for triple murder and firearm charges be re-imposed on him, in line with his sentencing in 1988. On 25 November 2006, Stone appeared in court in Belfast charged with attempting to murder Sinn Féin leaders Gerry Adams and Martin McGuinness. Stone faced a total of five charges of attempted murder following the incident at Stormont.

Stone was charged with possession of articles for terrorist purposes, possession of an imitation firearm in a public place, assault, grievous bodily harm, possession of an offensive weapon and possession of explosives. The court heard the articles allegedly for terrorist purposes included nail bombs, an axe and a garrotte. He was remanded in custody until 22 December 2006. A letter written by Stone was published in the Belfast Telegraph on 29 November 2006. In the letter dated 24 November 2006, Stone described his "mission to Kill" Adams and McGuinness in detail, giving a description of his intended movements once inside the building.

On 14 November 2008, Stone was found guilty of attempting to murder Adams and McGuinness. The judge said defence evidence that Stone had been taking part in some sort of a "comic parody" was "hopelessly unconvincing" and "self-contradictory". On 8 December 2008, Stone received a 16-year sentence for his actions at Stormont.

In 2013, a Belfast Court of Appeal ruled that Stone had to spend 18 more years in prison for the killings at Milltown cemetery. He was released on parole on 26 January 2021. A legal challenge by victims' families to prevent Stone from applying for early release from prison was dismissed by the Court of Appeal.

== Personal life ==
Stone married Marlene Leckey in 1976; the couple separated in 1978 and divorced in 1983. At the time of his divorce, Stone was cohabiting with Leigh-Ann Shaw, and they married in 1985. The marriage produced two children, and also ended in divorce.
