= Phil Johnston =

Phil Johnston may refer to:

- Phil Johnston (filmmaker) (born 1971), American filmmaker and voice actor
- Phil Johnston (footballer) (born 1990), Scottish footballer
- Philip W. Johnston (1944–2025), American businessman and politician

== See also ==
- Philip Johnston (disambiguation)
- Phillip Johnson (disambiguation)
