= Phillip Johnson =

Phillip, Philip, or Phil Johnson may refer to:

== Sports ==
- Phil Johnson (basketball, born 1941), former basketball player and coach
- Phil Johnson (basketball, born 1958), assistant men's basketball coach at UTEP since 2012
- Tony Johnson (rower) (Philip Anthony Johnson, born 1940), American rower
- Philip Johnson (tennis) (born 1964), American tennis player
- Philip G. Johnson (horseman) (1925–2004), American horseman
- Philip Johnson (rugby league), rugby league footballer in England

== Law, politics, crime ==
- J. Philip Johnson (born 1938), North Dakota judge
- Phil Johnson (judge) (born 1944), justice of the Texas Supreme Court
- Philip Johnson (Pennsylvania politician) (1818–1867), U.S. Congressman from Pennsylvania
- Phillip E. Johnson (1940–2019), professor of law and one of the founders of the intelligent design movement
- Philip Francis Johnson (1835–1926), Irish nationalist political labour activist
- Philip N. Johnson (born 1955), armored car guard who stole approximately $19 million

== Other ==
- Philip Johnson (1906–2005), American architect
- Philip Johnson (UK architect) (born 1972), UK architect
- Philip C. Johnson Jr. (1828–1887), U.S. Navy officer
- Philip G. Johnson (1894–1944), President of Boeing
- Philip S. Johnson (1953–2011), American violinist and thief of the Ames Stradivarius
- Philip Johnson (actor) (born 1991), American actor

== See also ==
- Philip Johnson-Laird (born 1936), professor of psychology
- Philip Johnston (disambiguation)
- Phil Johnston (disambiguation)
- Phil Johnstone (born 1957), musician
