= Jim Gray (UDA member) =

Northern Irish loyalist (1958–2005)

- Jim Gray
- Born: James Gray; 1958; Belfast, Northern Ireland
- Died: 4 October 2005 (aged 46–47); East Belfast, Northern Ireland
- Military career
- Allegiance: Ulster Defence Association (UDA)
- Rank: Brigadier
- Nickname: "Doris Day"
- Unit: East Belfast Brigade
- Conflict: The Troubles

James Gray (1958 – 4 October 2005), known as Jim Gray, was a Northern Irish loyalist and the East Belfast brigadier of the Ulster Defence Association (UDA), the largest Ulster loyalist paramilitary organisation in Northern Ireland. He was often nicknamed "Doris Day" for his flamboyant clothing, jewellery, and dyed blond hair. Another media nickname for Gray was the "Brigadier of Bling". He was the owner of several bars in East Belfast.

== Early life ==
Gray, the son of James and Elizabeth Gray, was born in 1958 and raised a Protestant in East Belfast. He had one sister, Elizabeth. He left school at age 15 and had ambitions of becoming a professional golfer, playing off a handicap of three. He briefly worked at the Short Brothers' factory but did not hold the job long as he was heavily involved in petty crime with the Tartan gangs prevalent in loyalist areas at the time.

== Ulster Defence Association ==
According to an interview in the Sunday World with his ex-wife Anne Tedford, to whom a youthful Gray was married for four years (a marriage that produced one son, Jonathan), Gray joined the loyalist paramilitary Ulster Defence Association (UDA) when she was in maternity hospital. She claimed that Gray was offered a lift home by a near-neighbour, Gary Matthews, who was already a UDA member, and that Matthews had Gray sworn in as a member soon afterwards. He eventually rose to become brigadier of the East Belfast Brigade, taking over after Ned McCreery was killed by the UDA in 1992.

=== Brigadier ===
Nicknamed "Doris Day" and the "Brigadier of Bling", Gray, who was 6'3" in height, became known as the most flamboyant leader in the UDA with his dyed blond bouffant hair, permanent suntan, gold earring, ostentatious jewellery, and expensive pastel clothing. In their book UDA – Inside the Heart of Loyalist Terror, journalists Henry McDonald and Jim Cusack described him as "looking more like an ageing New Romantic" than the leader of a paramilitary organisation. He once attended a UDA meeting with the Secretary of State for Northern Ireland, John Reid, wearing a loud Hawaiian-print shirt with a pink jumper draped over his shoulders. A heavy cocaine user, Gray made large amounts of money from selling drugs, protection racketeering, and extortion. Gray's criminal empire was reported to have made him one of the richest brigadiers in UDA history. He also acquired several bars in his native east Belfast. One of these, the "Avenue One" in Templemore Avenue, he used as the headquarters for his substantial criminal empire. He lived in an expensive luxury flat in an exclusive private residence and was protected by a devoted gang dubbed "the Spice Boys". A supporter of Rangers, Gray was reported as knowing a number of players personally and meeting them during his regular visits to Ibrox Park.

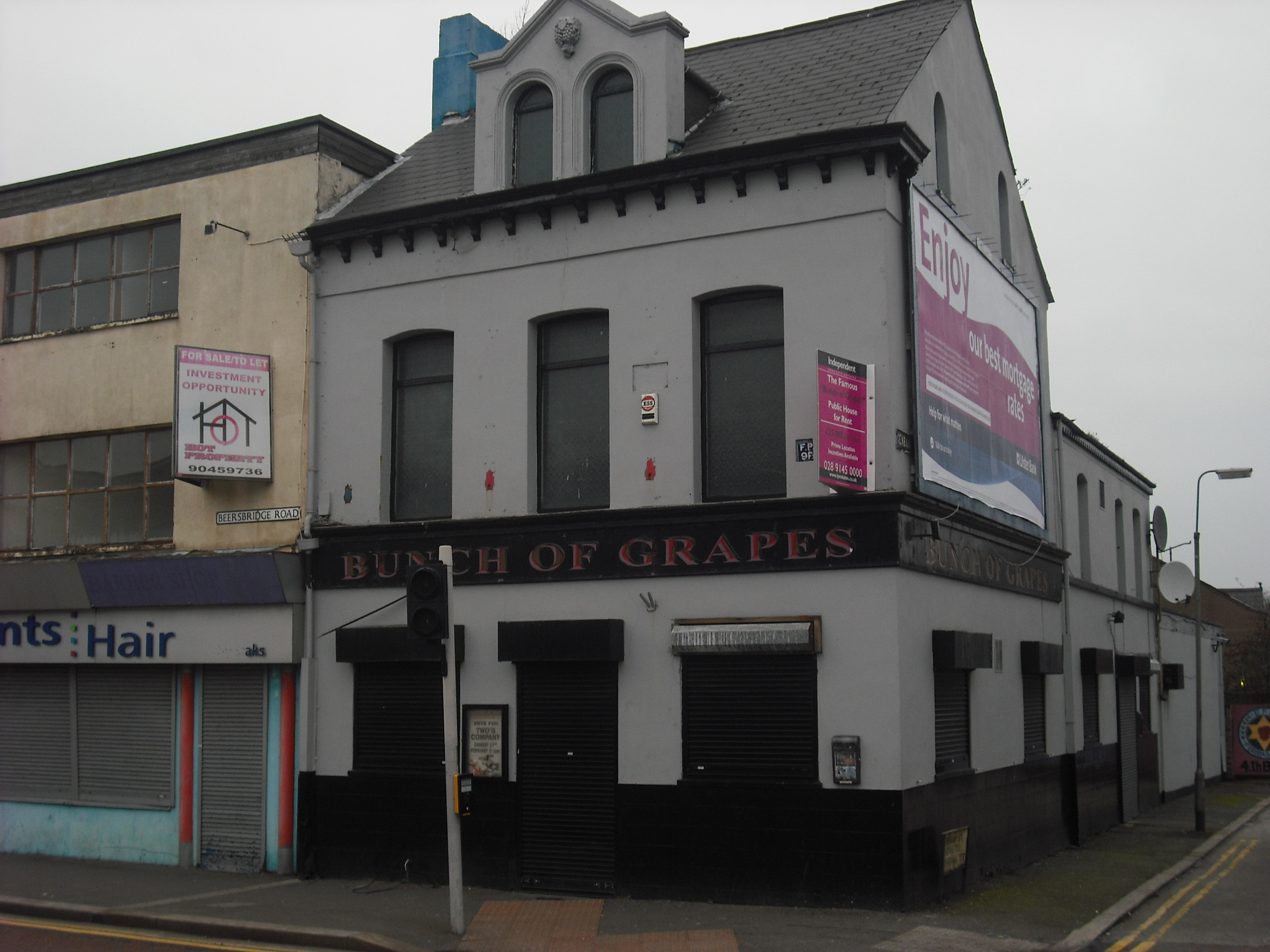
The Bunch of Grapes, Gray's pub on Belfast's Castlereagh Road

Renowned for his violent temper, he once allegedly brutally beat then stomped on a man's head during an outdoor Rod Stewart concert at Stormont in full view of the audience. On another occasion, he violently attacked a man with a golf club after the latter had beaten him in a game of golf. For that assault, Gray was barred from the Ormeau Golf Club. He had allegedly ordered the killing of his predecessor McCreery, whom he accused of being a police informer. Gray then took over his brigade and one of his pubs. In January 2001, the gunman, Geordie Legge met a grisly end, allegedly at the hands of Gray and his henchmen. Legge had reportedly denounced Gray's organised criminal racket and tried to interfere with Gray's lucrative drug-dealing, and he was repeatedly tortured and stabbed to death inside "The Bunch of Grapes", another of Gray's east Belfast pubs.

After the killing, Legge's body was placed in a carpet and dumped outside Belfast. Legge's knife wounds were so severe that his head was almost severed from the body. The pub was set on fire to eliminate the signs of the torture that had been carried out inside. Gray was one of the mourners who attended Legge's funeral. Gray and his right-hand man Gary Matthews, who co-owned the Bunch of Grapes, sought to claim on their insurance for the pub fire and sued AXA when they refused to pay out. Gray and Matthews were eventually forced to drop the case as the judge did not accept their version of events surrounding the fire and AXA successfully argued that they had not disclosed their UDA membership when they took out the policy. The following year on 13 September 2002, Gray was shot in the face by UDA rivals; the plastic surgery to repair the considerable facial injuries cost £11,000. The shooting, which was blamed on West Belfast Brigadier Johnny Adair, had been described by the police as "loosely related" to the death of Stephen Warnock, a Loyalist Volunteer Force (LVF) leader, in one of the loyalist feuds. Adair had previously started a whispering campaign against both Gray and John Gregg of the UDA South East Antrim Brigade, claiming both men were to be stood down as part of his attempts to take full control of the UDA.

As part of this Adair, who was close to the LVF, had visited the Warnock family and suggested that Gray had been involved in their relative's death (which had actually been carried out by a hired Red Hand Commando gunman after Warnock refused to pay a drug debt to a North Down businessman). As a result, Gray was shot by a lone gunman after he left the Warnock home, where he had been paying his respects to the deceased. On 25 September, Gray discharged himself from the Ulster Hospital to attend a meeting of all the brigadiers bar Adair at which he, John Gregg, Jackie McDonald, Billy McFarland and Andre Shoukri found Adair guilty of treason for his role in Gray's shooting and released a press statement to the effect that Adair was expelled from the UDA. Two weeks after the attack, Gray flew to Tenerife for a holiday. He allegedly owned property in Spain.

Gray's son, Jonathan, died of a drugs overdose in 2002 while with his father on holiday in Thailand. An October 2005 report by the Belfast Telegraph claimed that Jim Gray was bisexual and would regularly take holidays to Thailand to have sex with teenage boys.

== Expulsion and arrest ==
Gray was expelled by the UDA leadership in March 2005, for "treason" and "building a criminal empire outside the UDA", according to the South Belfast brigadier, Jackie McDonald. It was suggested that Gray was a Special Branch informer who passed on information to the police about his friends and associates. In April that year, he was arrested whilst driving; several thousand pounds were found in the car, and the Police Service of Northern Ireland (PSNI) believed he was intending to travel to the Republic of Ireland with what they suspected to be the proceeds of drug dealing and extortion. Gray was charged with money laundering, and held in custody until September when he was released on bail. During this time, police raids on a number of locations brought in thousands of documents related to this investigation. At the same time the prominent Belfast estate agent Philip Johnston was also arrested under suspicion of money laundering.

Gray was replaced as head of the UDA East Belfast Brigade by Jimmy Birch.

== Shooting death ==
Gray was shot five times in the back and killed outside his father's house in the east Belfast Clarawood estate on 4 October 2005, by two unknown gunmen. The shooting took place at 8 p.m. while he was unloading weight-lifting equipment from the boot of his silver Mini Cooper. As his body lay on the front lawn, local people took photos and passed the news to others via their mobile phones.

According to Gray's father, his son had left the house after Gary Matthews arrived to give him a set of weights and cigarettes that he had bought for Gray in Spain. Shots rang out and when Gray's father went out to see what had happened he found his son had been shot and Matthews was ringing for an ambulance. The involvement of other loyalist factions was suspected, fueling speculation that he was murdered to prevent him making an agreement with the police to expose his former associates in the UDA. Six people were arrested on suspicion of involvement in the murder, Ultimately however no charges were brought with the investigating officer, Detective Inspector Deborah McMaster, admitting at Gray's inquest in 2007 that the police had largely given up on securing any convictions due to a lack of evidence.

East Belfast MP Peter Robinson (later First Minister of Northern Ireland from 2008 to January 2016) stated after Gray's killing that "there was no excuse for the murder". Fellow UDA member and former friend, Michael Stone claimed that Gray had told him he was a businessman rather than a loyalist, as loyalism did not pay the bills.

Unlike most brigadiers, he was not given a paramilitary funeral, complete with volleys of gunfire fired over the coffin. It was a private affair, attended by only 14 mourners. As a further sign of his unpopularity among loyalists, a street disco was held in east Belfast to celebrate his death. Gray's effigy, with a curtain ring representing his trademark single gold earring, was thrown upon a bonfire. In lieu of murals dedicated to his memory, there was only graffiti scrawled on an east Belfast wall which read: "Jim Gray RIP – Rest in Pink". Gray's estate was frozen by the Assets Recovery Agency as part of an investigation into his criminality.

== Bibliography ==
- Lister, David & Jordan, Hugh (2004). Mad Dog – The Rise and Fall of Johnny Adair and C Company, Edinburgh: Mainstream Publishing.
- McDonald, Henry & Cusack, Jim (2004). UDA – Inside the Heart of Loyalist Terror. Dublin: Penguin Ireland.

Other offices
Preceded by Ned McCreery	Ulster Defence Association East Belfast Brigadier; 1992–2005	Succeeded by Jimmy Birch
