= Philip Johnston (estate agent) =

Northern Irish estate agent

Philip Johnston (1966–2017) was an estate agent from Belfast, Northern Ireland.

In April 2005 Johnston was arrested on suspicion of money laundering. Former Ulster Defence Association (UDA) leader Jim Gray had been arrested three days earlier, along with Gray's then girlfriend Sharon Moss The three were suspected to be using Johnston's property business to launder money from Gray's criminal activities. Central to the allegations was a luxury property Gray was renting from Johnston at Cherry Tree Walk in Cherryvalley. Johnston also purchased The Avenue One bar on the Newtownards Road from Gray for redevelopment.

Logo of Johnston's company (2008–2013)

In October 2005 Gray was shot dead at his father's home in east Belfast, after being expelled from the UDA.

In August 2006 all charges against Johnston were dropped without explanation from the Public Prosecution Service for Northern Ireland. After his arrest Johnston was forced to sell his business and was expelled from the National Association of Estate Agents. The case was raised with the Police Ombudsman. His former business was subject to a management buyout, operating as MCW Residential.

In 2007 BBC Northern Ireland screened House Traders, a documentary series on Johnston's business. A follow-up programme was screened in December 2008.

In April 2008, Johnston bought back his former estate agency offices in East Belfast.

On 8 February 2013 it was reported that Philip Johnston had been denied a gun license due to his links with paramilitaries.

On 24 June 2013 it was reported that Philip Johnston had sold his business.

Philip Johnston was found dead at his home on 19 June 2017.
