= Ulster Young Militants =

Youth wing of the Ulster Defence Association

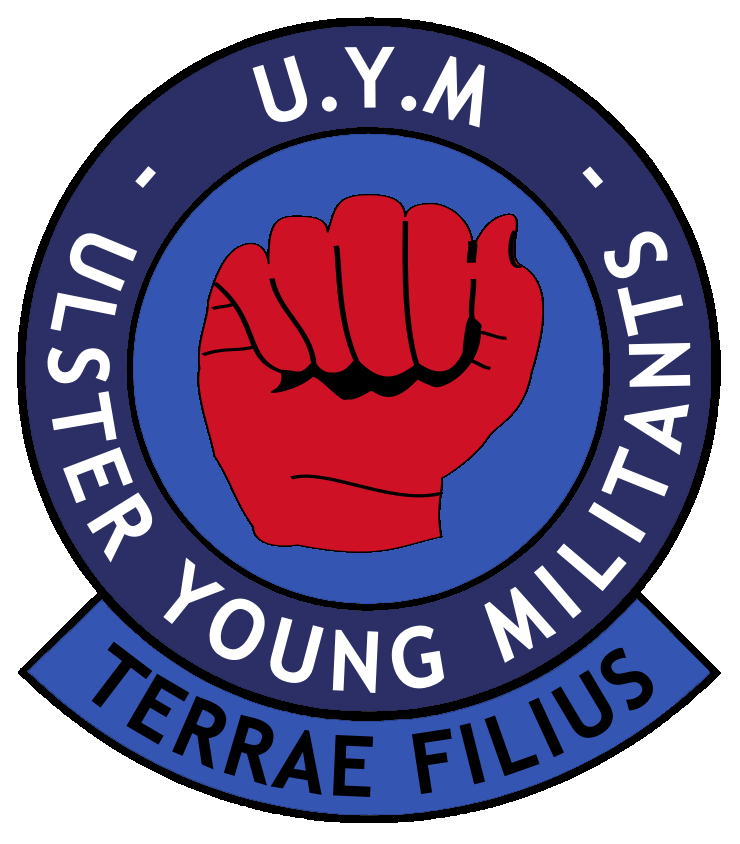
- Above: Emblem of the UYM featuring their Latin motto "Terrae Filius".

The Ulster Young Militants (UYM) is the youth wing of the Ulster Defence Association (UDA), an Ulster loyalist paramilitary group in Northern Ireland. Commonly known as the Young Militants or UYM, the group formed in 1974 when the Troubles were at their height. Their motto is "terrae filius", Latin for "Sons of the Land". Their numbers are unknown, but are mainly concentrated in the Belfast area, particularly east and south Belfast. They are often associated with the far-right and radical right.

== Development ==
The UYM had its origins in the "Tartan Gangs" of the early 1970s, unofficial loyalist street gangs who gained their name from the tartan scarves and flash of tartan they wore on their denim jackets. The tartan was said to commemorate the 1971 Scottish soldiers' killings by the Provisional IRA. Author Ian S. Wood has also suggested that the fashion may have been inspired by the Bay City Rollers although it has been noted elsewhere that the Bay City Rollers did not take off until 1974 (by which time the Tartan Gangs were well established) and the band's following tended more towards the teenage girl market. The main activities of the Tartan Gangs were the intimidation of Roman Catholic families in loyalist areas of Belfast and, on weekends, attacks on Catholic youths and businesses in Belfast city centre. These gangs included "The Shankill Young Tartan", "Ardcarn Boot Boys", "Ballybeen Riot Squad" and the "Young Newton" from the Ballymacarrett area of East Belfast. In the Shankill Road area, the Tartan Gang quickly came under UDA control and served as their youth movement, although elsewhere in the city they remained independent and during a series of riots in the east in 1972 they proved notoriously difficult for the UDA leadership to control. In East Belfast, some Tartan Gang members known to John McKeague formed the basis of the Red Hand Commando when he established that group in 1972. During the Ulster Workers' Council strike of 1974, Tartan Gangs roamed the streets of Belfast, ensuring compliance with the stoppage called by the Ulster Workers' Council. The Tartans would form the first of three major youth subcultures that formed the basis of the UYM, the others being skinheads in the early 1980s and "spides" in the 1990s.

Although the exact date of formal establishment of the UYM as an official group attached to the UDA is unknown it is estimated to have been around 1974. The group was initially restricted to 16-year-olds although demand for membership became so high following the Combined Loyalist Military Command ceasefire of 1994 that the age limit was dropped to fourteen. Many prominent loyalists are believed to have been members of the UYM before joining the UDA, including Johnny Adair and John Gregg, whilst Jim Gray, Billy "Twister" McQuiston and Michael Stone were Tartan Gang members. Adair and a number of friends, including Sam McCrory, joined the UYM as a group in 1987.

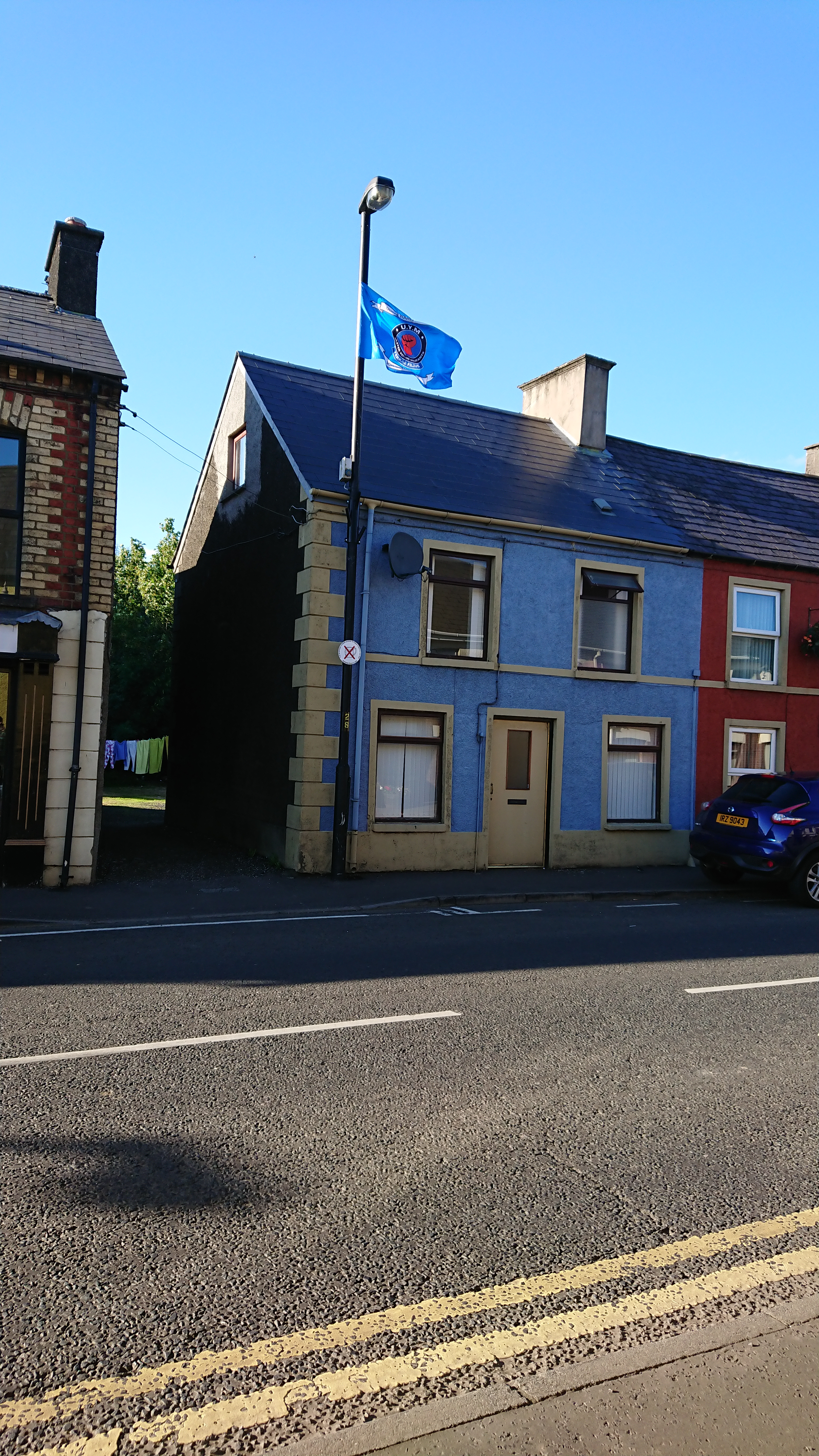
A UYM flag flying in the rural village of Broughshane, County Antrim.

In 2021 following the Irish Sea border protests in South and North Belfast, the UYM allegedly re-emerged. After five nights of rioting and the breaking open the gates of the Belfast peace wall, a Facebook message appeared showing the UYM being encouraged to work with the YCV to march through West Belfast, a Catholic area of the city.

== Activities ==
The UYM attached to the UDA West Belfast Brigade soared in number under Johnny Adair and in 2000 they played a leading role in helping to drive Ulster Volunteer Force members and supporters out of the Lower Shankill as part of a loyalist feud between the two paramilitary groups. Their involvement was such that Jack McKee, a born-again Christian preacher noted for his anti-paramilitary activity, reported that in secondary schools around the Shankill some pupils had to be let out at different times and from different gates depending on whether they were members of the UYM or the Young Citizen Volunteers.

Later, members have been involved in rioting, particularly during the marching season and at interface areas. The group was particularly active in this respect in the Tiger's Bay area, where they were deployed by the UDA to attack homes in the neighbouring nationalist New Lodge and Newington areas. One local member, Glen Branagh (a distant relative of the actor Kenneth Branagh), died in these clashes when, on 11 November 2001, a pipe bomb he was holding exploded in his hand whilst he stood with fellow UYM members on the Duncairn Gardens interface area. They have also been blamed for arson attacks on Catholic schools and churches. In 1999 the UYM was behind over 230 pipe bomb attacks in the UDA South East Antrim Brigade area alone.

According to the University of Ulster's CAIN Project, the group were responsible for one death during the conflict. In 2001 members of the UYM attacked and killed Trevor Lowry in Newtownabbey, believing him to be a Roman Catholic. It was later discovered that Lowry was a Protestant. Of the two convicted for his murder one, Harry Speers, was significantly over the usual UYM age limits but was in fact commander of the Glengormley UYM and had direct responsibility for preparing UYM members for the transition to the UDA. However, as well as Lowry's murder, according to Henry McDonald and Jim Cusack, a UYM member also killed the UDA's Stephen Audley on 17 March 1991 after the pair fought over a handgun at a party, with the weapon discharging during the struggle and killing Audley.

== See also ==
- Fianna Éireann
- Young Citizen Volunteers
