= Ulster Defence Association =

Ulster loyalist paramilitary group formed in 1971

- Emblem of the Ulster Defence Association
- Leaders: Charles Harding Smith (1971–1973); Andy Tyrie (1973–1988); John McMichael (Commander of the UFF until 1987); Inner Council: Jackie McDonald, Johnny Adair, Jim Gray, Andre Shoukri, Jimbo Simpson, Billy McFarland, Matt Kincaid
- Dates active: September 1971 – present (on ceasefire since October 1994; ended armed campaign in November 2007)
- Groups: Ulster Young Militants (youth wing)
- Headquarters: Belfast
- Active regions: Northern Ireland (mostly); Republic of Ireland; England
- Ideology: Ulster loyalism; Protestant extremism; Irish unionism; Anti-Catholicism; Anti-Irish sentiment; Ulster nationalism (briefly)
- Size: 40,000 at its peak (1972); Over 5,000 at the end of its armed campaign; 2,000 (2023)

The Ulster Defence Association (UDA) is an Ulster loyalist paramilitary group in Northern Ireland. It was formed in September 1971 as an umbrella group for various loyalist groups and undertook an armed campaign of almost 24 years as one of the participants of the Troubles. Its declared goal was to defend Ulster Protestant loyalist areas and to combat Irish republicanism, particularly the Provisional Irish Republican Army (IRA). In the 1970s, uniformed UDA members openly patrolled these areas armed with batons and held large marches and rallies. Within the UDA was a group tasked with launching paramilitary attacks that used the cover name Ulster Freedom Fighters (UFF) so that the UDA would not be outlawed. The British government proscribed the UFF as a terrorist group in November 1973, but the UDA itself was not proscribed until August 1992.

The UDA/UFF were responsible for more than 400 deaths. The vast majority of its victims were Irish Catholic civilians, killed at random, in what the group called retaliation for IRA actions or attacks on Protestants. High-profile attacks carried out by the group include the Top of the Hill bar shooting, the Milltown massacre, the Sean Graham's and James Murray's bookmakers' shootings, the Castlerock killings, killings of Paddy Wilson and Irene Andrews and the Greysteel massacre. Most of its attacks were in Northern Ireland, but from 1972 onward it also carried out bombings in the Republic of Ireland. The UDA/UFF declared a ceasefire in 1994 and ended its campaign in 2007, but some of its members have continued to engage in violence. The other main Loyalist paramilitary group during the conflict was the Ulster Volunteer Force (UVF). All three groups are proscribed organisations in the United Kingdom under the Terrorism Act 2000.

== History ==
The Ulster Defence Association emerged from a series of meetings during the middle of 1971 of loyalist "vigilante" groups called "defence associations". The largest of these were the Shankill and Woodvale Defence Associations, with other groups based in East Belfast, Lower Shankill and Roden Street.

=== UDA formation ===
The first meeting, in September 1971, was chaired by Billy Hull, with Alan Moon of the lower Shankill as its vice-chair. Moon was quickly replaced by Jim Anderson. Moon, who had become reluctant to be involved in vigilantism since the group's formation, willingly stepped aside and ended his association with the UDA soon afterwards. The structure of this new movement soon took shape with a thirteen-man Security Council established in January 1972 as a reaction to a Provisional IRA bomb the previous month at the Balmoral furniture showroom on the Shankill which killed four people including two infants.

By this point, Charles Harding Smith had become the group's leader, with former Royal Army Ordnance Corps soldier Davy Fogel as his second-in-command, who trained the new recruits in military tactics, the use of guns, and unarmed combat. Its most prominent early spokesperson was Tommy Herron; however, Andy Tyrie would emerge as leader soon after. Its original motto was Cedenta Arma Togae ("Law before violence") and it was a legal organisation until it was banned by the British government on 10 August 1992. Under Smith's command, the UDA was organised along paramilitary lines into battalions, companies, platoons and sections. The organisation drew more members, becoming the largest loyalist paramilitary organisation in Northern Ireland. Unlike its principal rival, the Ulster Volunteer Force (UVF), the UDA was legal.

In April 1972, the organisation's leader, Charles Harding Smith and leading UDA member John White were arrested in London for gun-trafficking. A temporary de facto leadership assumed control and Anderson became the acting chairman of the UDA.

At the end of May 1972, Fogel, by then the leader of B Company and Harding Smith's second-in-command, erected the first UDA roadblocks and street barricades, making Woodvale, the area under Fogel's command, a no-go area. The operation attracted a great deal of media and press coverage, resulting in much publicity for the UDA. British Army troops under the command of Major-General Robert Ford were sent to the area, where a stand-off with the UDA ensued. Leading UDA figures eventually entered into street negotiations with senior Army officers, where it was eventually agreed that the UDA could erect small temporary barriers in Loyalist neighbourhoods. That summer, the UDA marched through the streets of central Belfast in a massive demonstration of strength.

In December 1972, Harding Smith and White were acquitted and returned to Belfast. Immediately after their return, a fierce power struggle ensued after Harding Smith declared to his associates: "I'm the boss. I take orders from no one". Fogel was promptly ousted from the B Company command, while the formidable East Belfast brigadier, Tommy Herron, appeared on the scene to challenge Harding Smith's leadership. Anderson became joint chairman of the UDA with Harding Smith. The struggle that ensued between Harding Smith and Herron overshadowed the Inner Council and during the height of the feud Anderson often had to call a register at its meetings, so poor were the turnouts. Herron and Anderson became linked and the East Belfast brigadier took to styling himself as deputy leader to Anderson, whom he treated as sole chairman.

By spring 1973, however, Fogel had already returned to his native England, and Anderson decided to stand down. He publicly announced his resignation as joint chairman in March 1973, in part because he was a fairly law-abiding individual who sat uneasily with violently chaotic figures like Harding Smith and Herron. It had been Anderson who had been one of the main thinkers behind the UDA's motto "Law Before Violence" although this was ditched shortly after his resignation in favour of "Quis separabit". As a compromise candidate between the rival factions of Harding Smith and Herron, Andy Tyrie, commander of West Belfast Brigade's A Company, was chosen as the UDA's chairman. He would soon become the UDA's Supreme Commander, a position he held until an attempted car bombing brought about his retirement in March 1988.

Early in its history the UDA was closely associated with the Vanguard movement led by William Craig and it was regularly described as the "military wing" of Vanguard. At a rally in Lisburn in February 1972, Craig inspected uniformed ranks of UDA members. Craig issued a warning during a rally at Ormeau Park the next month, where thousands of UDA men were present: "If the politicians fail us, it might become our responsibility to eliminate the enemy." However, by 1979 the UDA had turned on Craig over his increasingly conciliatory approach to Nationalists and condemnation of the 1977 loyalist strike, leading the UDA to instead back Peter Robinson in that year's general election.

=== Membership ===
UDA members marching through Belfast city centre, mid-1972

At its peak of strength it held around forty thousand members, mostly part-time. During this period of legality, the UDA committed a large number of attacks using the name Ulster Freedom Fighters, including the murder of Social Democratic and Labour Party (SDLP) politician Paddy Wilson and his companion Irene Andrews in 1973. The UDA was involved in the successful Ulster Workers Council Strike in 1974, which brought down the Sunningdale Agreement, a power-sharing agreement for Northern Ireland which some unionists thought conceded too much to nationalist demands. The UDA enforced this general strike through widespread intimidation across Northern Ireland. The strike was led by VUPP Assemblyman and UDA member, Glenn Barr.

The UDA were often referred to by the nickname "Wombles" by their rivals, mainly the Ulster Volunteer Force (UVF). The nickname is derived from the furry fictional children's TV creatures The Wombles, and was given to the UDA because many of its members wore fur-trimmed parkas. Its headquarters is in Gawn Street, off the Newtownards Road in east Belfast, and its current motto is Quis Separabit, which is Latin for "Who will separate [us]?".

=== Women's units ===
The UDA had several women's units, which were independent of each other. Although they occasionally helped staff roadblocks, the women's units were typically involved in local community work and responsible for the assembly and delivery of food parcels to UDA prisoners. This was a source of pride for the UDA. The first women's unit was founded on the Shankill Road by Wendy "Bucket" Millar, whose sons Herbie and James "Sham" Millar would later become prominent UDA members. The UDA women's department was headed by Jean Moore, who also came from the Shankill Road. She had also served as the president of the women's auxiliary of the Loyalist Association of Workers. Her brother Ingram "Jock" Beckett, one of the UDA's founding members, had been killed in March 1972 by a rival UDA faction in an internal dispute. Moore was succeeded by Hester Dunn of east Belfast, who also ran the public relations and administration section at the UDA headquarters. Wendy Millar's Shankill Road group was a particularly active women's unit, and another was based in Sandy Row, south Belfast, a traditional UDA stronghold. The latter was commanded by Elizabeth "Lily" Douglas. Her teenaged daughter, Elizabeth was one of the members.

The Sandy Row women's UDA unit was disbanded after it carried out a vicious "romper room" punishment beating on 24 July 1974 which left 32-year-old Ann Ogilby dead. The body of Ogilby, a Protestant single mother who had an affair with the husband of one of the unit's members, was found in a ditch five days later. The day of the fatal beating Ogilby was abducted and forced upstairs to the first floor of a disused bakery in Sandy Row that had been converted into a UDA club. Two teenage girls, Henrietta Cowan and Christine Smith, acting under Elizabeth Douglas' orders to give Ogilby a "good rompering", punched, kicked, then battered her to death with bricks and sticks; the autopsy later revealed that Ogilby had suffered 24 blows to the head and body. The killing, which was carried out within earshot of Ogilby's six-year-old daughter, caused widespread revulsion throughout Northern Ireland and was condemned by the UDA prisoners serving inside the Maze Prison. None of the other UDA women's units had consented to or been aware of the fatal punishment beating until it was reported in the news. Douglas, Cowan, and Smith were convicted of the murder and sentenced to imprisonment at Armagh Women's Jail. Seven other members of the women's unit and a UDA man were also convicted for their part in the murder. The UDA "romper rooms", named after the children's television programme, were places where victims were beaten and tortured prior to being killed. This was known as a "rompering". The "romper rooms" were normally located in disused buildings, lock-up garages, warehouses, and rooms above pubs and drinking clubs. The use of the "romper rooms" was a more common practice among male members of the UDA than their female counterparts.

=== Paramilitary campaign ===
The flag of the "Ulster Freedom Fighters" with a clenched fist representing the Red Hand of Ulster and the Latin motto Feriens tego, meaning "striking I defend"

Starting in 1972 the UDA along with the other main Loyalist paramilitary group the Ulster Volunteer Force, undertook an armed campaign against the Catholic population of Northern Ireland that would last until the end of the troubles. In May 1972, the UDA's pressured leader Tommy Herron decided that responsibility for acts of violence committed by the UDA would be claimed by the "UFF". Its first public statements came one month later.

The UDA's official position during the Troubles was that if the Provisional Irish Republican Army (Provisional IRA) called off its campaign of violence, then it would do the same. However, if the British government announced that it was withdrawing from Northern Ireland, then the UDA would act as "the IRA in reverse."

Active throughout the Troubles, its armed campaign gained prominence in the early 1990s through Johnny Adair's ruthless leadership of the Lower Shankill 2nd Battalion, C. Company, which resulted in a greater degree of tactical independence for individual brigades. C. Company's hit squad, led by Stephen McKeag, became notorious for a campaign of random murders of Catholic civilians in the first half of the 1990s.

They benefited, along with the Ulster Volunteer Force, and a group called Ulster Resistance (set up by the Democratic Unionist Party), from a shipment of arms imported from Lebanon in 1988. The weapons landed included rocket launchers, 200 rifles, 90 pistols and over 400 grenades. Although almost two–thirds of these weapons were later recovered by the Royal Ulster Constabulary (RUC), they enabled the UDA to launch an assassination campaign against their perceived enemies.

North Belfast UDA brigadier Davy Payne was arrested after his "scout" car had been stopped at a RUC checkpoint and large caches of the weaponry were discovered in the boots of his associates' cars. He was sentenced to 19 years in prison.

In 1992, Brian Nelson, a prominent UDA member who served as the organisation's intelligence chief, was arrested by the Stevens Inquiry Team. It was subsequently uncovered that he was also an agent of the Force Research Unit (FRU), an undercover Intelligence Corps unit. Over a period of two months, Nelson dictated a police statement covering 650 pages. He claimed that he had been tasked by his FRU handlers with transforming the UDA into a more effective force, particularly at carrying out killings. Using information supplied by his handlers, Nelson produced dossiers on proposed targets, which were passed on to UDA hitmen. Nelson was subsequently sentenced to 10 years in prison.

One of the most high-profile UDA attacks came in October 1993, when three masked men attacked a restaurant called the Rising Sun in the predominantly Catholic village of Greysteel, County Londonderry, where two hundred people were celebrating Halloween. The two men entered and opened fire. Eight people, including six Catholics and two Protestants were killed and nineteen wounded in what became known as the Greysteel massacre. The "UFF" claimed the attack was in retaliation to the IRA's Shankill Road bombing, which killed nine people seven days earlier.

According to the Sutton database of deaths at the University of Ulster's CAIN project, the UDA was responsible for 259 killings during the Troubles. 220 of its victims were civilians (predominantly Catholics), 37 were other loyalist paramilitaries (including 30 of its own members), three were members of the security forces and 11 were republican paramilitaries. According to the Stevens Enquiry, a number of these attacks were carried out with the assistance or complicity of elements of the British security forces. The preferred modus operandi of the UDA was individual killings of civilian targets in nationalist areas, rather than large-scale bomb or mortar attacks.

The UDA employed various codewords whenever they claimed their attacks. These included: "The Crucible", "Titanic", "Ulster Troubles" and "Captain Black".

=== Post-ceasefire activities ===
Its ceasefire was welcomed by the Northern Ireland Secretary of State, Paul Murphy, and the Chief Constable of the Police Service of Northern Ireland, Hugh Orde.

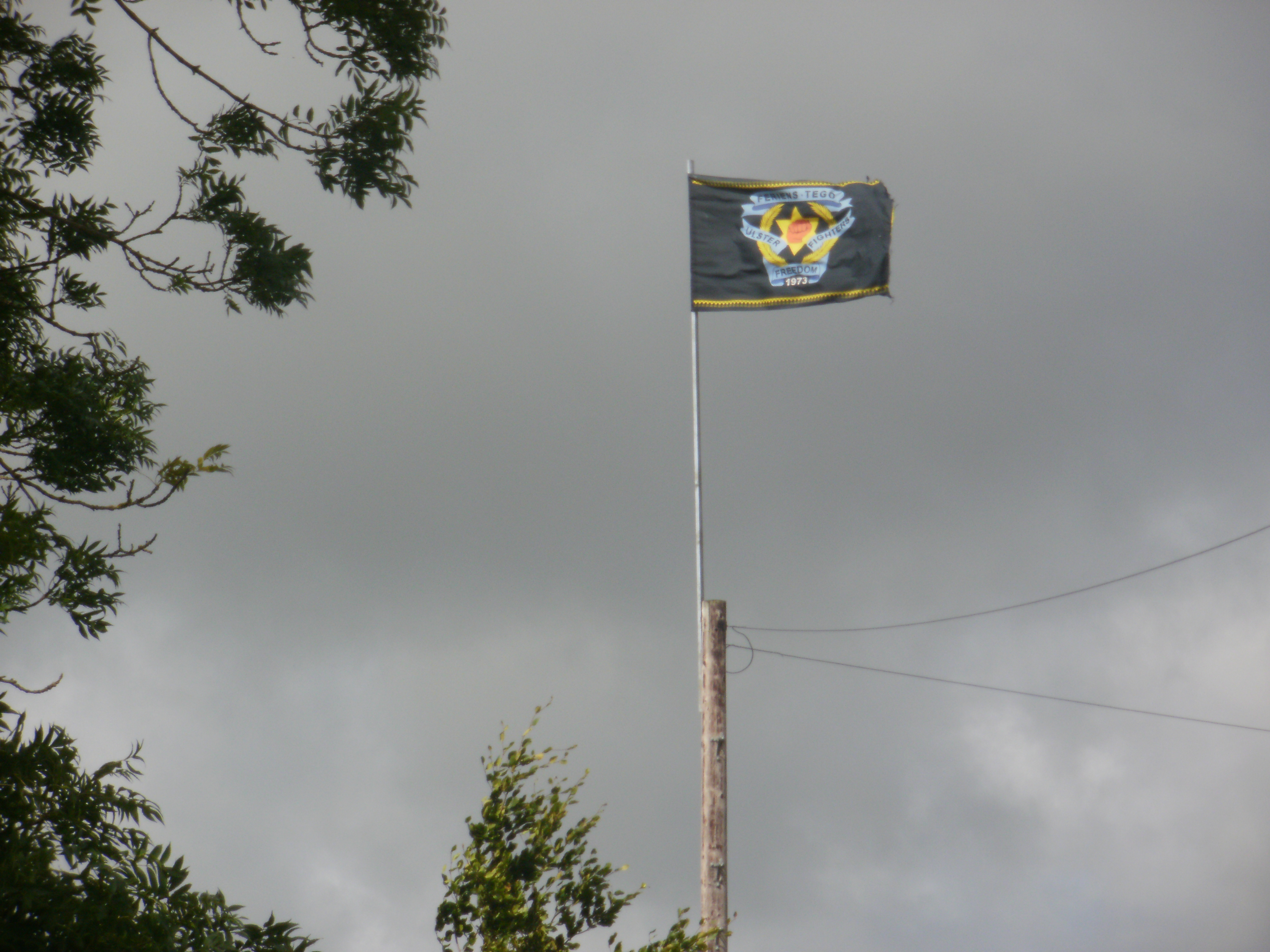
A UFF flag in Finvoy, a rural area of County Antrim

Since the ceasefire, the UDA has been accused of taking vigilante action against alleged rival drug dealers, including tarring and feathering a man on the Taughmonagh estate in south Belfast. It has also been involved in several feuds with the UVF, which led to many killings. The UDA has also been riddled by its own internecine warfare, with self-styled "brigadiers" and former figures of power and influence, such as Johnny Adair and Jim Gray (themselves bitter rivals), falling rapidly in and out of favour with the rest of the leadership. Gray and John Gregg are amongst those to have been killed during the internal strife. On 22 February 2003, the UDA announced a "12-month period of military inactivity". It said it would review its ceasefire every three months. The UPRG's Frankie Gallagher has since taken a leading role in ending the association between the UDA and drug dealing.

Following an August 2005 Sunday World article that poked fun at the gambling losses of one of its leaders, the UDA banned the sale of the newspaper from shops in areas it controls. Shops that defy the ban have suffered arson attacks, and at least one newsagent was threatened with death. The Police Service of Northern Ireland began accompanying the paper's delivery vans. The UDA was also considered to have played an instrumental role in loyalist riots in Belfast in September 2005.

On 13 November 2005 the UDA announced that it would "consider its future", in the wake of the standing down of the Provisional IRA and Loyalist Volunteer Force.

In February 2006, the Independent Monitoring Commission (IMC) reported UDA involvement in organised crime, drug trafficking, counterfeiting, extortion, money laundering and robbery.

On 20 June 2006, the UDA expelled Andre Shoukri and his brother Ihab, two of its senior members who were heavily involved in organised crime. Some saw this as a sign that the UDA was slowly coming away from crime. The move did see the southeast Antrim brigade of the UDA, which had been at loggerheads with the leadership for some time, support Shoukri and break away under former UPRG spokesman Tommy Kirkham. Other senior members met with Taoiseach Bertie Ahern for talks on 13 July in the same year.

On 11 November 2007 the UDA announced that the Ulster Freedom Fighters would be stood down from midnight of the same day, with its weapons "being put beyond use" although it stressed that these would not be decommissioned.

Although the group expressed a willingness to move from criminal activity to "community development", the IMC said it saw little evidence of this move because of the views of its members and the lack of coherence in the group's leadership as a result of its decentralised structure. While the report indicated the leadership intends to move towards its stated goals, factionalism hindered this change and was the strongest hindrance to progress. Although most loyalist actions were curtailed since the IMC's previous report, most of loyalist paramilitary activity was coming from the UDA.

The IMC report concluded that the leadership's willingness to change has resulted in community tension and the group would continue to be monitored, although "the mainstream UDA still has some way to go." Furthermore, the IMC warned the group to "recognise that the organisation's time as a paramilitary group has passed and that decommissioning is inevitable." Decommissioning was said to be the "biggest outstanding issue for loyalist leaders, although not the only one."

On 6 January 2010, the UDA announced that it had put its weapons "verifiably beyond use". The decommissioning was completed five weeks before a government amnesty deadline beyond which any weapons found could have been used as evidence for a prosecution. The decommissioning was confirmed by Canadian General John de Chastelain, chairman of the Independent International Commission on Decommissioning, as well as Lord Eames, former Archbishop of Armagh and Sir George Quigley, former top civil servant.

Chastelain stated that the decommissioning included arms, ammunition, explosives and explosive devices and the UDA stated that the arms "constitute the totality of those under their control". Following the decommissioning the Ulster Political Research Group, the UDA's political representatives, stated that the "Ulster Defence Association was formed to defend our communities; we state quite clearly and categorically that this responsibility now rests with the Government and its institutions where legitimacy resides". UDA representative Frankie Gallagher also stated that the group now regretted being responsible for the killing of more than 400 people.

Shaun Woodward, the British Secretary of State for Northern Ireland, stated that this "is a major act of leadership by the UDA and further comprehensive evidence of the success of politics over violence in Northern Ireland" and the act was also welcomed by Sinn Féin and DUP politicians. The President of the Republic of Ireland, Mary McAleese, described the decommissioning as "a very positive milestone on the journey of peace". US Secretary of State Hillary Clinton also welcomed the move as a step towards lasting peace in Northern Ireland.

=== South East Antrim group ===
This area also continues to use the "UDA" title in its name, although it too expressed willingness to move towards "community development". Although serious crime is not prevalent among its members, some who were arrested for illegal drug sales and "extortion" were exiled by the Brigade. A clear distinction between the factions was not available in the 20th IMC report, as this was the first report to differentiate between the two.

== Politics ==
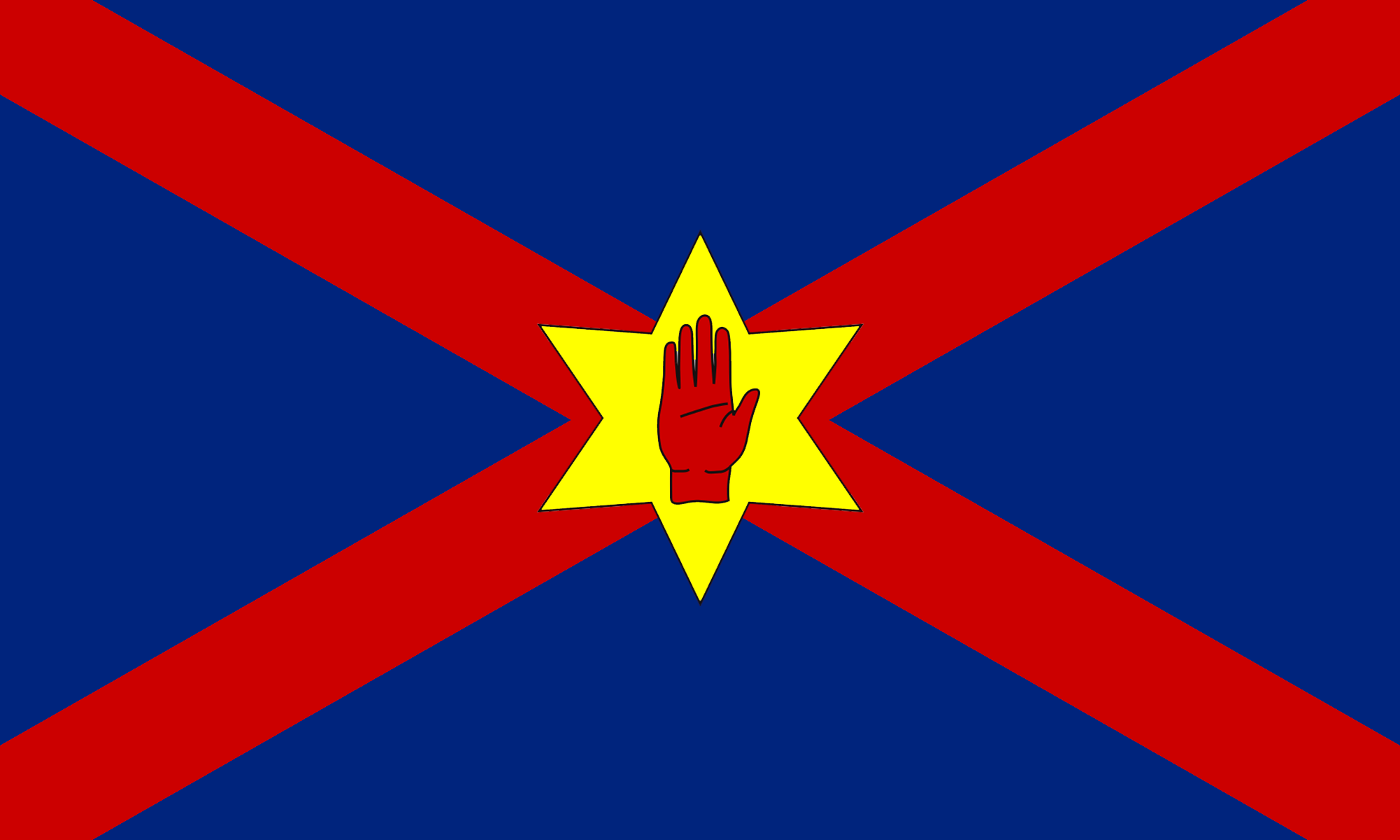
Some UDA leaders supported an independent Northern Ireland in the mid–late 1970s.

In the 1970s the group favoured Northern Ireland independence, but they have retreated from this position and towards standard unionism.

The New Ulster Political Research Group (NUPRG) was initially the political wing of the UDA, founded in 1978, which then evolved into the Ulster Loyalist Democratic Party in 1981 under the leadership of John McMichael, a prominent UDA member killed by the IRA in 1987, amid suspicion that he was set up to be killed by some of his UDA colleagues.

In 1987, the UDA's deputy commander John McMichael (who was then the leader of the UFF) promoted a document entitled Common Sense, which promoted a consensual end to the conflict in Northern Ireland, while maintaining the Union. The document advocated a power-sharing assembly involving both nationalists and unionists, an agreed constitution and new Bill of Rights. It is not clear, however, whether this programme was adopted by the UDA as their official policy. However, the killing of McMichael that same year and the subsequent removal of Tyrie from the leadership and his replacement with an Inner Council saw the UDA concentrate on stockpiling weapons rather than political ideas.

In 1989, the ULDP changed its name to the Ulster Democratic Party (UDP). It finally dissolved itself in 2001 following very limited electoral success and internal difficulties. Gary McMichael, son of John McMichael, was the last leader of the UDP, which supported the signing of the Good Friday Agreement. The Ulster Political Research Group (UPRG) was subsequently formed to give political analysis to the UDA and act as community workers in loyalist areas. It is currently represented on the Belfast City Council.

In early January 1994, the UDA released a document calling for ethnic cleansing and repartition, with the goal of making a new Northern Ireland which would have been wholly Protestant. The plan was to be implemented should the British Army withdraw from Northern Ireland. Areas in the south and west with strong Catholic/nationalist majorities would be handed over to the Republic, and those Catholics left stranded in the "Protestant state" would be "expelled, nullified, or interned". The story was printed in The Sunday Independent newspaper on 16 January. The "doomsday plan" was based on the work of Dr Liam Kennedy, a lecturer at Queen's University Belfast who in 1986 had published a book called Two Ulsters: A Case for Repartition, although it did not call for ethnic cleansing. The UDP's Raymond Smallwoods said "I wasn't consulted but the scenario set out is a perfectly plausible one". The DUP's Sammy Wilson stated that the plan "shows that some loyalist paramilitaries are looking ahead and contemplating what needs to be done to maintain our separate Ulster identity"

== Support from other groups ==
The UDA had links with Neo-Nazi groups in Britain—specifically Combat 18 (formed in 1992) and the British National Socialist Movement (formed in 1985). Members of these groups helped to smuggle weapons for the UDA. The UDA has received backing from Combat 18, the National Front and the British National Party. The links may not have been politically motivated, but for mutually beneficial arms deals. On one occasion the UDA sent Louis Scott, one of the few black members of the UDA, to make the transaction. Johnny Adair, who had been in Combat 18 before the UDA, established stronger links once he became a brigadier.

The Red Hand Defenders is a cover name used by breakaway factions of the UDA and the LVF. The term was coined in 1997 when members of the LVF carried out attacks on behalf of Johnny Adair's "UFF 2nd Battalion, 'C' Company (Shankill Road)" and vice versa. The relationship between the UDA (specifically Adair's West Belfast Brigade, not the wider leadership of the UDA) was initially formed after the death of Billy Wright, the previous leader of the LVF, and grew from Adair's personal friendship with Mark 'Swinger' Fulton, the organisation's new chief.

The necessity for a cover name resulted from the need to avoid tensions between the UDA and the UVF, the organisation from which the LVF had broken away. It was perceived that any open co-operation between the UDA and the LVF would anger the UVF, something which proved to be the case in following years and resulted in a loyalist feud. There has been debate as to whether or not the Red Hand Defenders have become an entity in their own right made up of dissident factions from both the UDA and the LVF (both of which have now declared ceasefires whilst the RHD has not), although much intelligence has been based on the claims of responsibility which, as has been suggested, are frequently misleading.

A 1985 MI5 assessment reported that 85% of the UDA's "targeting material" came from security force records.

Scotland was a source of fundraising and other types of aid. Former MI5 agent Willie Carlin said: "There were safe houses in Glasgow and Stirling. The ferry [between Scotland and Northern Ireland] was pivotal in getting arms into the north—and anything like checkpoints, or armed police and Army in Scotland would have b******d that all up." An Irish government memo written by David Donoghue stated: "The commonest contribution of Scots UDA and UVF is to send gelignite. Explosives for the north were mostly shipped in small boats which set out at night from the Scottish coast and made contact at sea with vessels from Ulster ports." Donoghue noted the links between Orange Lodges in Scotland and loyalist paramilitary groups in Northern Ireland and that membership of the Orange Order in Scotland at the time was 80,000, and was concentrated in Glasgow, Lanarkshire and Inverness. The Northern Ireland Affairs Select Committee noted in its report that "in 1992 it was estimated that Scottish support for the UDA and UVF might amount to £100,000 a year."

Protestants in Canada also supported the loyalist paramilitaries in the conflict. Sociologist Steven Bruce described the support networks in Canada as "the main source of support for loyalism outside the United Kingdom ... Ontario is to Ulster Protestants what Boston is to Irish Catholics." After the Troubles began, an Orange-Canadian loyalist organization known as the Canadian Ulster Loyalist Association (CULA) provided the 'besieged' Protestants with the resources to arm themselves. A Canadian branch of the UDA also existed and sent $30,000 to the UDA's headquarters in Belfast by 1975. In 1972, five Toronto businessmen shipped weapons in grain container ships out of Halifax, bound for ports in Scotland, Wales, and Northern Ireland which were destined for loyalist militants.

Between 1979 and 1986, Canadian supporters supplied the UVF/UDA with 100 machine guns and thousands of rifles, grenade launchers, magnum revolvers, and hundreds of thousands of rounds of ammunition. These shipments were considered enough for the UVF/UDA to wage its campaign, most of which were used to kill its victims. On 10 February 1976, following the sudden uptick of violence against Catholic civilians by loyalist militants, Irish cardinal William Conway and nine other Catholic bishops met with British Prime Minister Harold Wilson and his cabinet, asking them as to where the loyalist militants had acquired guns, to which Secretary of State for Northern Ireland Merlyn Rees replied "Canada".

== Structure and leadership ==
The UDA is made up of:

- the Inner Council
- the Ulster Freedom Fighters (UFF)—whose role was to carry out attacks on republican and nationalist targets. However, many regard the UFF as merely a covername used when the UDA wished to claim responsibility for attacks.
- the Ulster Defence Force (UDF)—whose role was to give "specialist military training" to a select group of UDA members. The UDF was initiated by John McMichael (the then UDA/UFF commander) in 1985 as a response to the Anglo-Irish Agreement. The UDF operated training camps in rural parts of Northern Ireland that young loyalists such as Johnny Adair claim to have attended. One reported 'survival' training technique was to leave trainees stranded in Dublin with only £1. The training, which was described by UDA members as forming "the nucleus of a new loyalist army at the ready", was made possible thanks to "a sophisticated network of legal businesses" which allowed for the implementation of ambitious training programmes.
- the Ulster Young Militants (UYM)—the "youth wing" of the group. Formed in 1973.
- the Ulster Political Research Group (UPRG)—the UDA's "political advisory body". Formed in 1978.

The UDA operated a devolved structure of leadership, each with a brigadier representing one of its six "brigade areas". It is not clear whether this brigade structure has been maintained in the UDA's post cease-fire state. The UDA's six "brigade areas" were:

- North Belfast
- East Belfast
- South Belfast, the UDA's largest brigade area, covering all of South Belfast down to Lisburn and operating as far away as South County Down, Lurgan, Portadown and Counties Tyrone and Fermanagh.
- West Belfast
- Southeast [County] Antrim
- North County Antrim & County Londonderry

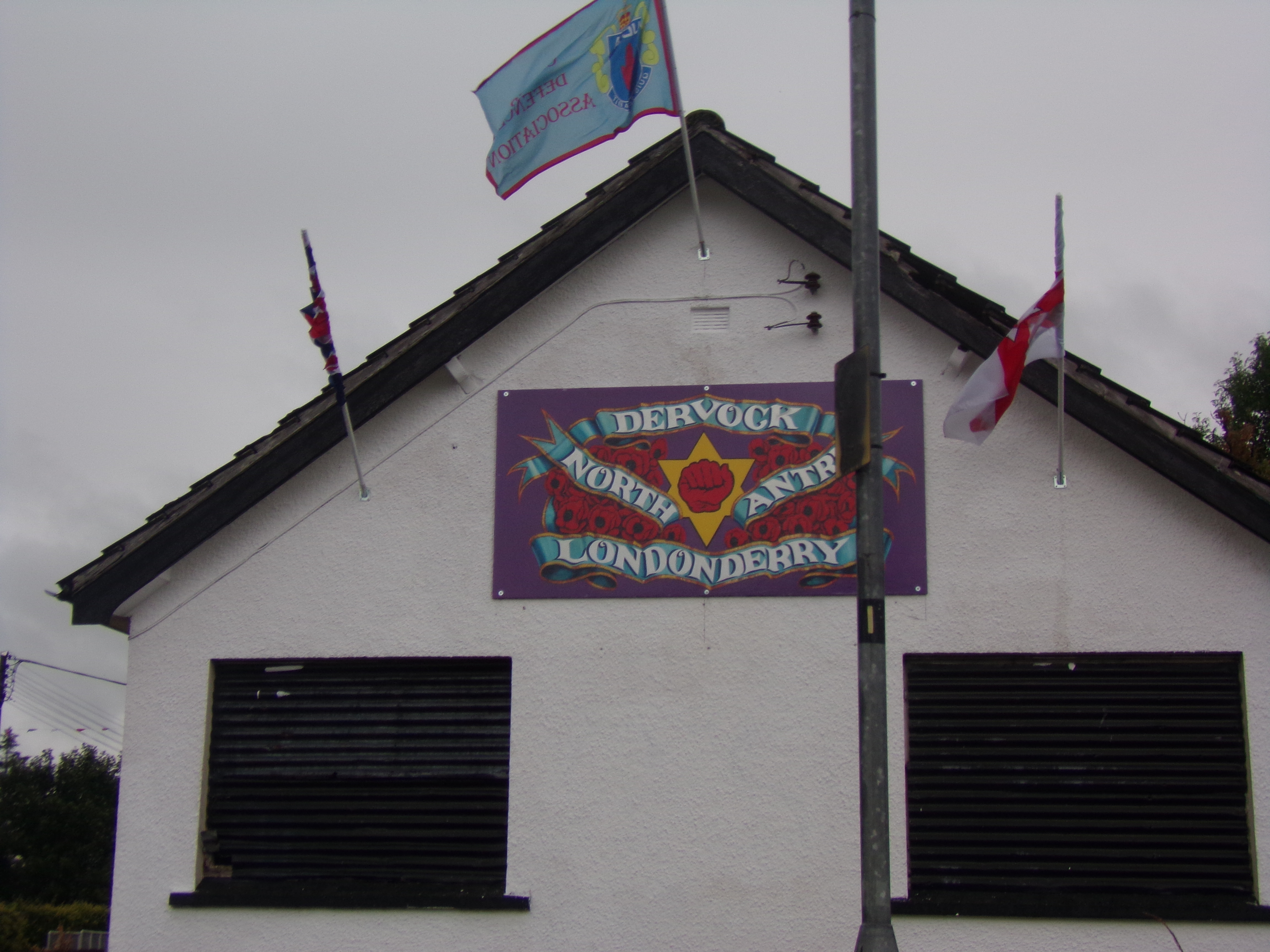
A wall sign in Dervock showing support for the North Antrim and Londonderry brigade

In addition to these six core brigades two others may have existed. A seventh Mid-Ulster Brigade is mentioned by Steve Bruce as having existed for part of the UDA's history although Henry McDonald and Jim Cusack characterise this as a "battalion" rather than a brigade and suggest that its rural location prevented it from fully developing. In the late 1970s a Scottish Brigade was established under the command of Roddy McDonald but this proved short-lived. The security forces infiltrated this brigade almost immediately and in 1979 arrested almost its entire membership, ninety people in all. Six members received particularly lengthy prison sentences for their involvement in UDA activities in Perth and the Scottish Brigade quietly disappeared.

Some of the notable brigadiers include:

• Jackie McDonald—South Belfast (~1980s–present) Resident of the Taughmonagh estate in South Belfast. McDonald was a cautious supporter of the UDA's ceasefire and a harsh critic of Johnny 'Mad Dog' Adair during his final years of membership of the organisation. McDonald remains the only brigadier who did not have a commonly used nickname.

• Johnny 'Mad Dog' Adair—West Belfast (1990–2002) An active figure in the UDA/UFF, Adair rose to notoriety in the early 1990s when he led the 2nd Battalion, C Company unit in West Belfast which was responsible for one of the bloodiest killing sprees of the Troubles.

• Jim 'Doris Day' Gray—East Belfast (1992–2005) An unlikely figure in Northern Ireland loyalism, the openly bisexual Gray was a controversial figure in the organisation until his death on 4 October 2005. Always flamboyantly dressed, Gray was a key figure in the UDA's negotiations with Northern Ireland Secretary John Reid. It is widely believed that Gray received his nickname from the RUC Special Branch.

• Jimbo 'Bacardi Brigadier' Simpson—North Belfast (Unknown–2002) Simpson is believed to have been an alcoholic, hence his nickname. He was leader of the UDA in the volatile North Belfast area, an interface between Catholics and Protestants in the New Lodge and Tiger's Bay neighbourhoods.

• Billy 'The Mexican' McFarland—North Antrim and Londonderry (Unknown–2013) He earned his nickname because of his moustache and swarthy appearance, and had overall command of the UDA's North Antrim and Londonderry brigade at the time of the Good Friday Agreement. He supported the leadership against Johnny Adair and has been associated with the magazine 'Warrior', which makes the case for Ulster Independence.

• Andre 'The Egyptian' Shoukri—North Belfast (2002–2005) Initially a close ally of Johnny Adair, Shoukri and his brother Ihab became involved with the UDA in his native North Belfast. The son of an Egyptian father and a Northern Irish mother, he was expelled from the UDA in 2005 following allegations of criminality.

• John 'Grug' Gregg—South East Antrim (c.1993–2003) John 'Grug' Gregg was a man with a fearsome reputation within the loyalist movement, known as a "Hawk" in loyalist circles, and controlled the streets of south east Antrim. On 14 March 1984, he severely wounded Sinn Féin president Gerry Adams in an assassination attempt for which he was jailed. When asked by the BBC in prison if he regretted anything about the shooting, his reply was "only that I didn't succeed." He was killed on Belfast's Nelson Street, along with another UDA member (Rab Carson), while travelling in a taxi from the docks in 2003, and the murder was blamed on supporters of Johnny Adair, who had recently been expelled from the UDA in 2002.

== Deaths as a result of activity ==
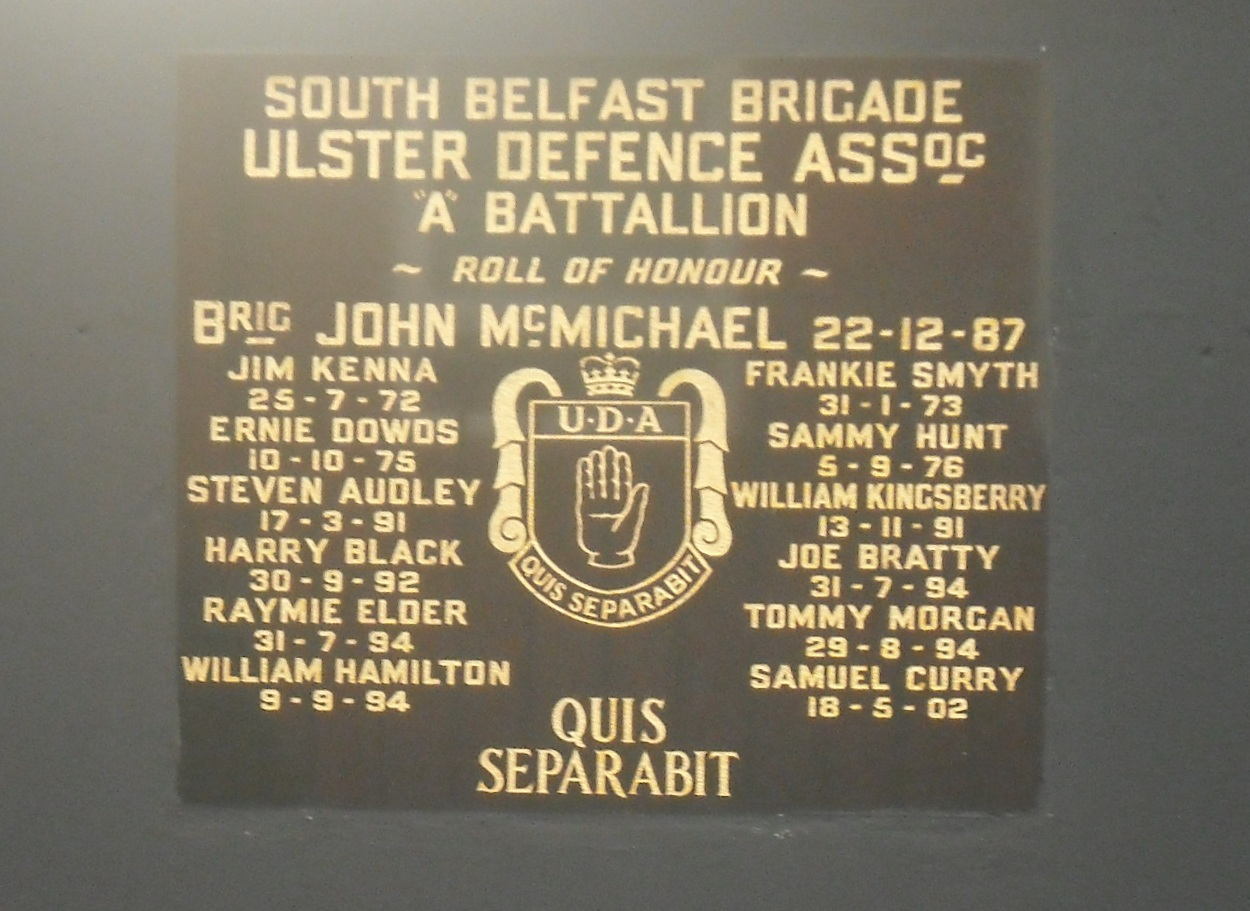
UDA South Belfast Brigade memorial plaque in Sandy Row

Malcolm Sutton's Index of Deaths from the Conflict in Ireland, part of the Conflict Archive on the Internet (CAIN), states that the UDA/UFF was responsible for at least 260 killings, and lists a further 256 loyalist killings that have not yet been attributed to a particular group. According to the book Lost Lives (2006 edition), it was responsible for 431 killings.

Of those killed by the UDA/UFF:

- 209 (~80%) were civilians, 12 of whom were civilian political activists
- 11 (~4%) were members or former members of republican paramilitary groups
- 37 (~14%) were members or former members of loyalist paramilitary groups
- 3 (~1%) were members of the British security forces

The CAIN database says there were 91 UDA members and four former members killed in the conflict.

== See also ==
- Real Ulster Freedom Fighters
- Timeline of Ulster Defence Association actions
- Ulster Volunteer Force
- Provisional Irish Republican Army
- Irish National Liberation Army
