= Chronology of Provisional Irish Republican Army actions (1992–1999) =

This is a chronology of activities by the Provisional Irish Republican Army (IRA), from 1992 to 1999.

== 1992 ==
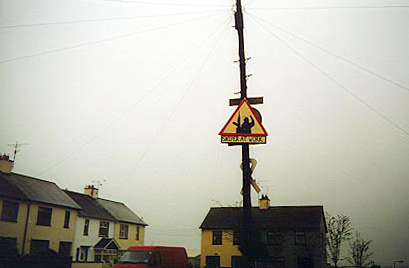
A Sniper at work sign, near Crossmaglen, warns British troops of the presence of the South Armagh Sniper.

=== January–February ===
- 1 January 1992:
  - a gun battle occurred between British troops and an IRA unit at the Royal Ulster Constabulary (RUC) barracks in Pomeroy, County Tyrone.
  - incendiary devices severely damaged a clothes shop in Belfast city centre. and caused minor damage to a hardware store in Belfast. An unexploded incendiary device was discovered in the same premises. A store in Newtownards, County Down was also destroyed. The fire spread to an adjoining garage and damaged several cars. Furthermore, two devices were found and defused in a furniture store in Bangor, County Down. The IRA also claimed to have planted incendiary devices in stores in Lisburn and Sprucefield retail park.
  - a series of hoax bomb alerts in the Greater Belfast area were dealt with by British security forces.
- 2 January 1992: an incendiary device ignited in a textile shop in Belfast causing around £1,000,000 worth of damage. An incendiary device also exploded in a sportswear shop in Glengormley, County Antrim and a device was discovered in a carpet shop in Newtownards, County Down.
- 3 January 1992: an Ulster Defence Regiment (UDR) soldier's wife and his 18-month-old daughter escaped injury when a 2 lb (0.91 kg) Semtex bomb partially exploded under their car on Holywood Road, Belfast.
- 4 January 1992:
  - a 4 lb (1.8 kg) Semtex bomb was discovered near Weeton army barracks, Lancashire.
  - an incendiary device planted in a Belfast cinema resulted in minor damage.
  - a 800 lb (360 kg) IRA car bomb exploded on Bedford Street in the centre of Belfast. The bomb caused extensive damage to property in the area.
  - a coffee jar bomb was thrown at an RUC mobile patrol on Ardilea Street in the Oldpark area of Belfast.
  - an IRA unit dropped a 5 lb (2.3 kg) Semtex bomb onto an armoured RUC patrol vehicle in the New Lodge area of Belfast.
  - a Semtex booby-trap bomb in a derelict house was defused by the British Army near Coagh, County Tyrone.
- 5 January 1992:
  - a 500 lb (230 kg) IRA bomb exploded on High Street in the centre of Belfast. The bomb caused extensive damage to property in the area.
  - an IRA unit fired several shots at a British Army foot patrol in the main street of Strabane, County Tyrone.
- 6 January 1992:
  - an IRA unit attacked a British Army foot patrol with a coffee jar bomb in the New Lodge area of Belfast; but the device failed to detonate.
  - an unexploded coffee jar bomb was neutralised by the British Army underneath the Leckey Road flyover in the Bogside area of Derry.
- 8 January 1992:
  - the Belfast-Dublin rail line was disrupted between Portadown and Dundalk by hoax bomb alerts.
  - a 400 lb (180 kg) IRA bomb found in a derelict building at Silverbridge, County Armagh was defused by the British Army.
  - a blast bomb was thrown at a British Army patrol in Stewart Street in the Markets area of Belfast. No reported injuries.
- 10 January 1992:
  - a small 5 lb (2.3 kg) bomb left in a briefcase by the IRA exploded 300 metres away from Downing Street, London. No injuries were reported.
  - a 100 lb (45 kg) car bomb badly damaged the area around Derry's RUC headquarters. One British soldier was injured.
  - five businesses were damaged by firebombs planted by the IRA in Ballymena.
- 11 January 1992: an incendiary device exploded in a clothes shop in Belfast causing extensive damage. Two devices also exploded in a furniture shop in Lisburn resulting in only minor damage.
- 12 January 1992: a coffee jar bomb lobbed over the perimeter fence of the British security forces base in Strabane, County Tyrone, failed to explode.
- 13 January 1992:
  - an IRA booby-trap bomb killed a Catholic civilian, Michael Logue, in Coalisland, County Tyrone. The bomb had been attached to his car by a magnet. It was a case of mistaken identity; the IRA had received information that he was working as a labourer on a British Army barracks (he was a joiner by trade), but this turned out to be untrue. The IRA apologised to his family.
  - an IRA unit opened fire on a British Army patrol near Clogher, County Tyrone. Soldiers also reported hearing an explosion. Fire was returned but there were no reported casualties.
- 14 January 1992:
  - an incendiary device exploded in a carpet shop in Belfast causing minor damage.
  - hundreds of workers were evacuated from Shorts aircraft factory, Belfast, after IRA hoax bomb threats.
- 15 January 1992: a coffee jar bomb lobbed at British security forces only partially detonated in Strabane, County Tyrone.
- 16 January 1992:
  - the IRA planted two Semtex bombs in Derry city centre. One exploded in an insurance company's premises, the second in a tax office.
  - a small IRA bomb planted on the roof of Belfast Central railway station was defused by the British Army.
- 17 January 1992:
  - an IRA landmine blew up a minibus at Teebane near Cookstown, County Tyrone. It killed eight men who were working as building contractors for the British Army in Omagh; six other contractors were badly injured. One of the dead was also a soldier in the Royal Irish Rangers.
  - a small IRA bomb left outside a bank in May Street, Belfast, was defused by the British Army.
- 18 January 1992: five IRA firebombs destroyed or badly damaged several businesses in Portadown, County Armagh.
- 19 January 1992: a coffee jar bomb was thrown at a joint British Army-RUC foot patrol in Flax Street in North Belfast. No reported injuries.
- 20 January 1992:
  - the IRA claimed responsibility for a "blast incendiary" that exploded in a car outside a nightclub on the Dublin Road, Belfast.
  - the IRA exploded an incendiary bomb inside a bar and restaurant on the Lisburn Road, Belfast, claiming the premises was frequented by off-duty members of British security forces and was a meeting place for informers.
  - the IRA claimed responsibility for a 5 lb (2.3 kg) bomb which failed to explode in the Victoria shopping centre, Belfast.
- 22 January 1992:
  - a former UDR soldier was shot and injured on his way to work at Fyfinn Road near Castlederg, County Tyrone.
  - the IRA planted several bombs inside Derry's city walls in Butcher Street. Two were placed in a bank premises and a building society. A third device in a car targeting British security forces exploded later.
- 23 January 1992:
  - an RUC officer was injured after a coffee jar bomb was thrown at a patrol in the Ardoyne area of North Belfast.
  - the IRA left a 5 lb (2.3 kg) "blast incendiary" bomb on the roof of Belfast Central railway station. The device failed to explode and was later defused by the British Army.
  - an IRA bomb detonated on the Derry railway line, forcing a passenger train to a halt.
  - an IRA bomb wrecked the Ulsterbus depot in Pennyburn Industrial Estate, Derry.
- 24 January 1992:
  - the IRA left a bomb in the Ulster Bank branch on May Street in Belfast city centre. The device exploded after IRA members entered the premises with a holdall bag and shouted a warning. An incendiary bomb had failed to explode in the same bank just a week earlier.
  - the IRA injured a British soldier in a bomb attack on the Falls Road, Belfast.
- 25 January 1992: an IRA unit carried out a coffee jar bomb attack against a joint British Army-RUC checkpoint at Kennedy Way, Belfast, but both devices failed to explode.
- 26 January 1992:
  - IRA units opened fire on Mountpottinger and Woodbourne RUC stations in Belfast.
  - a bomb exploded at building contractor's depot in the Ormeau Road area of Belfast. The IRA alleged they were carrying out work for British security forces.
- 27 January 1992:
  - a civilian was injured when an IRA bomb exploded at his shop in the bottom of Rockdale Street in Belfast.
  - a 1,100 lb (500 kg) roadside bomb with command wire was defused by the British Army on Liskey Road outside Strabane, County Tyrone. The IRA's West Tyrone Brigade claimed the attack had been aborted because of British security forces activity.
- 28 January 1992: a bomb exploded on the Dublin-Belfast rail line just outside Belfast.
- 29 January 1992:
  - the IRA launched a horizontal mortar at a UDR mobile patrol in Francis Street in Lurgan, County Armagh. The IRA's North Armagh Brigade claimed they scored a direct hit.
  - an IRA unit opened fire on a joint British Army-RUC checkpoint in Divis Street, Belfast.
- 30 January 1992:
  - an IRA firebomb was defused at Elephant and Castle, London.
  - an IRA unit fired several shots, including tracer rounds, at a British security forces checkpoint on Grosvenor Road, Belfast.
- 31 January 1992:
  - the IRA firebombed two Belfast shops causing £1,000,000 worth of damage.
  - a 500 lb (230 kg) IRA van bomb blew up in downtown Dungannon, County Tyrone, injuring three people and causing substantial damage both to the town center and the security base.
- 1 February 1992:
  - two hotels were damaged by 100 lb (45 kg) bombs left in their car parks in South Belfast.
  - a hotel was damaged by two bombs left inside the premises in North Belfast.
  - the IRA carried out a mortar attack on a British Army observation post at Cullaville, County Armagh. There were no reported injuries.
- 2 February 1992:
  - the IRA detonated a car bomb on Botanic Avenue, South Belfast. The explosion, along with another bomb, seriously damaged a hotel and caused widespread damage.
  - a device containing 6 lb (2.7 kg) of Semtex and shrapnel linked to a command wire was discovered in a ditch near Cappagh, County Tyrone. A second device was found in a derelict building nearby. Three men were arrested.
- 3 February 1992:
  - an IRA bomb left outside a bank in May Street, Belfast, was defused by the British Army.
  - a civilian (Gordon Hamill) was shot dead by the IRA in Dungannon, County Tyrone. Two men followed him to a supermarket and opened fire with AK-47 assault rifles, hitting him 32 times. The IRA claimed the man was a member of the UVF. Hamill remains listed as a civilian at the CAIN database. Press reports later described Hamill as the "finance officer" for the mid-Ulster UVF.
  - the IRA claimed to have abandoned a 10 lb (4.5 kg) bomb in the Altnaveigh area of County Armagh following an abortive attack on the Belfast-Dublin railway.
- 4 February 1992:
  - the IRA claimed responsibility for several hoax bombs left at arterial roads in Belfast.
  - IRA firebombs damaged several stores in Craigavon.
- 5 February 1992:
  - Joseph MacManus, an IRA volunteer from Sligo Town, County Sligo, was killed near the border at Mulleek, near Belleek, County Fermanagh, during a gun battle following the attempted ambush of a UDR soldier, Corporal Eric Glass, who was wounded in the attack. Glass was later awarded the Queen's Gallantry Medal as well as the Distinguished Conduct Medal.
  - the IRA carried out a blast bomb attack on the Ormeau Road, Belfast, premises of a firm it accused of "collaborating" with British security forces.
  - an IRA unit opened fire on an RUC checkpoint at Corporation Street, Belfast.
- 6 February 1992: the IRA carried out a blast bomb attack against a joint British Army-RUC patrol on Ardoyne Road, Belfast. The IRA claimed that three RUC officers were reported injured.
- 7 February 1992: a firebomb exploded on the London Underground at Barking.
- 8 February 1992:
  - the IRA carried out a vehicle-born mortar attack on an RUC station at Portglenone, County Antrim.
  - a blast bomb was thrown at a British Army foot patrol in the Bogside area of Derry.
- 9 February 1992:
  - an IRA unit attacked with assault rifles the RUC station in Coalisland, County Tyrone.
  - the IRA launched a horizontal mortar at an armoured patrol vehicle in Dungannon, County Tyrone. The device missed.
- 10 February 1992: a 5 lb (2.3 kg) IRA bomb exploded on the roof of Belfast Central Railway station, causing some damage.
- 11 February 1992:
  - a 5 lb (2.3 kg) IRA bomb exploded in a phone box in Whitehall, London. Talks between four Northern Ireland party leaders and the Prime Minister were happening nearby when the bomb detonated.
  - an IRA bomb was defused on Parliament Street, Exeter.
- 12 February 1992:
  - the British Army discovered and defused a 300 lb (140 kg) car bomb at Merchant's Quay, Newry.
  - the British Army defused a 200 lb (91 kg) bomb with detonator and command wire after a three-day search operation in the Forkhill area of County Armagh.
- 14 February 1992: a horizontal mortar launcher was found by British security forces near Magherafelt, County Londonderry.
- 15 February 1992:
  - the IRA detonated a 250 lb (110 kg) car bomb on Adelaide Street, Belfast. The bomb injured five RUC officers and caused millions of pounds worth of damage. The officers allegedly had been lured to the scene by a smaller 2 lb (0.91 kg) device.
  - the IRA claimed responsibility for two incendiary devices that detonated in a premium department store in Donegall Place, Belfast.
- 16 February 1992:
  - a blast incendiary bomb destroyed the Shaftesbury Inn in North Belfast. Similar devices damaged Fortwilliam golf club and Greenan Lodge Hotel. A bomb was also defused at the York Hotel.
  - IRA volunteers Kevin Barry O'Donnell, Sean O'Farrell, Peter Clancy, and Daniel Patrick Vincent were ambushed and killed by the SAS in Clonoe, County Tyrone. The IRA unit had just attacked Coalisland RUC base using a DShK heavy machine gun mounted on the back of a stolen lorry. The men were ambushed in a graveyard following the attack by undercover British soldiers. Two other IRA volunteers were wounded during the ambush but managed to escape. A British soldier was also injured during the incident.
  - the IRA claimed to have detonated a 20 lb (9.1 kg) bomb on the railway line between Dunmurray and Belfast Central Station.
  - 800 lb (360 kg) of explosives was found hidden in a trailer in Dundalk, County Louth, after the owner recovered it on the main Forkhill-Newry road following a theft weeks earlier.
- 17 February 1992:
  - the IRA detonated a 15 lb (6.8 kg) bomb at a UDR base on Charles Street, Portadown.
  - a coffee-jar bomb attack injured four RUC officers in the New Lodge area of Belfast.
  - an IRA unit opened fire on Fort Whiterock British Army base, Belfast.
  - a 10 lb (4.5 kg) bomb in a gas cylinder just outside Newry was defused by the British Army.
- 18 February 1992: the IRA exploded a bomb in a Belfast city centre shop, along with several other bomb alerts which caused "chaos".
- 19 February 1992: a 1,200 lb (540 kg) IRA van bomb was defused by the British Army outside the courthouse in Banbridge, County Down.
- 20 February 1992:
  - a 500 lb (230 kg) device was defused by the Irish Army near the border in County Louth.
  - the IRA detonated a 10 lb (4.5 kg) bomb on the Belfast-Larne railway line.
- 21 February 1992: a coffee jar bomb was lobbed at a British Army patrol but failed to explode in the Creggan area of Derry.
- 22 February 1992: a man and a woman (brother and sister) were injured when a "drogue bomb", an IRA homemade grenade, struck their car in Dungannon, County Tyrone. The IRA's intended target had been a British security forces patrol. Some sources say the device was a Mark-12 horizontal mortar bomb that hit the vehicle but failed to fully go off.
- 23 February 1992: the IRA left a hoax car bomb outside the RUC base in Downpatrick, County Down.
- 24 February 1992:
  - an IRA unit lobbed a blast bomb at RUC foot patrol in Drumgullion outside Newry.
  - a British soldier was wounded in a coffee-jar bomb attack in Ardoyne, Belfast.
  - an IRA unit lobbed a coffee jar bomb at a joint British Army-RUC foot patrol in the Markets area of Belfast.
  - an IRA unit fired upon an RUC patrol at Millfield, Belfast.
- 25 February 1992: two coffee-jar bombs were thrown at a combined RUC/British army checkpoint at Kennedy Way, Belfast. Both devices failed to explode.
- 26 February 1992:
  - an IRA incendiary bomb exploded in a furniture store in Dunmurray on the outskirts of Belfast.
  - two RUC bases at Woodbourne and Mountpottinger, Belfast, received small arms fire from IRA units.
- 27 February 1992:
  - the IRA issued threats to four companies involved in public roadworks adjacent to the "Camel's Hump" checkpoint in Strabane, County Tyrone. All denied being employed by British security forces; one firm stated they had ceased working for the security forces following an IRA threat three years earlier.
  - an IRA unit opened fire on a British Army checkpoint in the Short Strand area of Belfast.
- 28 February 1992:
  - the IRA carried out a coffee jar bomb attack against a joint British Army-RUC checkpoint in the Ardoyne area of Belfast.
  - the IRA detonated a bomb at London Bridge railway station injuring 29 people.
  - there was an exchange of fire between an IRA unit and members of the security forces manning a sangar near the RUC barracks at Strabane, County Tyrone.
- 29 February 1992: an IRA bomb exploded at the Crown Prosecution Service building in London injuring two people.

=== March–April ===
- 1 March 1992:
  - a small IRA bomb was defused at White Hart Lane BR station in London.
- 2 March 1992:
  - an IRA unit fired several shots at British soldiers manning an observation post atop a block of flats in the New Lodge area of Belfast. The IRA claimed the soldiers were carrying out work to fortify the position.
  - the IRA claimed responsibility for an explosive device attached to an RUC officer's car which failed to detonate in Glengormley, County Antrim.
- 5 March 1992:
  - a 1,000 lb (450 kg) IRA bomb exploded near the RUC base in the center of Lurgan, County Armagh, causing extensive damage to commercial properties. Several RUC officers and British soldiers were injured.
  - the IRA exploded a large car bomb in Adelaide Street in the centre of Belfast causing extensive damage. The IRA claimed the bomb was timed to detonate five minutes after a bomb in Lurgan the same day.
  - the IRA carried out a coffee jar bomb attack against a British security forces patrol at Belfast Law Courts.
  - the IRA carried out a coffee jar bomb attack against a British security forces patrol in the Markets area of Belfast.
  - a British soldier was injured by an IRA tripwire bomb at Favour Royal, near Augher, County Tyrone, and had to be airlifted to hospital with arm wounds.
- 6 March 1992: the IRA claimed responsibility for a bomb attached to the underside of a UDR soldier's car in Cavanaleck near Enniskillen, County Fermanagh. The device was neutralised by the British Army in a controlled explosion.
- 8 March 1992:
  - the IRA carried out a coffee jar bomb attack against a British Army patrol in Etna Drive in the Ardoyne area of Belfast.
  - an IRA unit fired fifty rounds at British soldiers manning an observation post atop a block of flats in the New Lodge area of Belfast.
- 9 March 1992: the IRA bombed and destroyed a service station on the Ballygawley/Dungannon road, County Tyrone, on the basis that they were supplying British forces. The 150 lb (68 kg) device had been planted on the premises on 7 March.
- 10 March 1992:
  - a small IRA bomb exploded near Wandsworth Common railway station in London; there were no injuries.
  - the IRA threw a coffee jar bomb at the RUC station in Lisanskea, County Fermanagh, as a vehicle entered but there were no reported injuries.
  - the British Army defused an anti-personnel device containing shrapnel and 44 lb (20 kg) of explosives fixed to a fence surrounding a GAA pitch, with a firing point nearby, on Friary Road, Armagh.
  - Gardaí discovered a 3,500 lb (1,600 kg) IRA bomb ready to be primed in a farm shed near Letterkenny, County Donegal. Mortar tubes, vehicles, and firearms including a SPAS-12 combat shotgun were also in the cache. Another stash in the area had mortar launchers, combat uniforms and communication equipment. Three men were detained.
- 12 March 1992: a 110 lb (50 kg) IRA car bomb was neutralised in a controlled explosion outside a hotel in Crescent Street, Belfast, by the British Army, causing some damage.
- 13 March 1992: the IRA carried out a coffee jar bomb attack against a British security forces patrol in the Beechmount area of Belfast.
- 14 March 1992:
  - the IRA carried out a coffee jar bomb attack against a British Army patrol in the Ardoyne area of Belfast.
  - a 100 lb (45 kg) bomb exploded on the Dungannon road about half a mile from Pomeroy, County Tyrone. A nearby house was damaged, and a passing female motorist had to be treated for severe shock.
- 15 March 1992: an IRA unit armed with GPMGs and assault rifles fired more than 1,000 rounds at two British helicopters from across the border near Rosslea, County Fermanagh.
- 16 March 1992: a primed 1,600 lb (730 kg) IRA bomb was defused at a block of flats at Broom Park Heights in the Twinbrook area of Belfast. Security forces believed the bomb, one of the largest ever found, was intended for an attack in the city centre.
- 17 March 1992: an unexploded coffee jar bomb was neutralised by the British Army in Francis Street, Newry.
- 20 March 1992:
  - an IRA unit lobbed two coffee jar bombs at New Barnsley British Army base, Belfast.
  - a coffee jar bomb was lobbed at an RUC mobile patrol in the Mountpottinger area of Belfast. One man was arrested.
- 24 March 1992:
  - the IRA detonated a massive car-bomb containing over 1,100 lb (500 kg) of explosive in Pakenham Street, Belfast. The bomb caused severe damage to the RUC base and nearby business premises.
  - a coffee jar bomb attack on a British security forces patrol failed and the device was later defused by the British Army at Armagh Road, Newry, near Drumgullion.
  - the British Army defused a 40 lb (18 kg) bomb with command wire intended for British security forces in Cookstown, County Tyrone Several families were evacuated from the surrounding area.
- 26 March 1992: an IRA unit opened fire on a British Army patrol in the vicinity of Musgrave Park base, Belfast. The IRA later claimed they fired sixty rounds.
- 27 March 1992:
  - a British Army observation post on top of a block of flats in the New Lodge area of Belfast was fired upon. The IRA later claimed they fired fifty rounds.
  - several shots were fired at New Barnsley RUC-British Army base in West Belfast.
  - two coffee jar bombs were thrown at an RUC foot patrol in the Poleglass area of West Belfast but there were no reported injuries.
  - a female RUC officer, Colleen McMurray, was killed when an IRA unit hit her patrol vehicle with a horizontal mortar in Newry, County Down. A fellow constable lost both his legs in the attack.
- 28 March 1992:
  - an IRA unit lobbed a blast bomb over the perimeter wall of Rosemount RUC station, Derry.
  - a bomb containing 12 lb (5.4 kg) of home-made explosives was found left in Fahan Street in Derry city centre.
- 29 March 1992:
  - a booby-trap bomb disguised as a football was defused after being discovered within the perimeter of the RUC base in Sion Mills, County Tyrone.
  - an IRA unit fired twenty rounds at a newly-built sangar at Oldpark RUC station, Belfast.
- 30 March 1992: a bomb exploded as a joint British Army/RUC mobile patrol passed in the Beechmount area of Belfast. The IRA claimed that a vehicle had been disabled and four RUC officers injured in an improvised grenade attack.
- 3 April 1992: a small IRA bomb detonated at the perimeter fence of an RUC base in the Fivemiletown area, County Tyrone.
- 4 April 1992: a 14 lb (6.4 kg) IRA bomb connected to a command wire concealed in a partially-built shop was defused by the British Army in Strabane, County Tyrone.
- 5 April 1992:
  - British soldiers discovered a 4 lb (1.8 kg) booby-trap bomb at Drumfurrer on the Tyrone-Monaghan border.
  - British Army bomb disposal experts defused a coffee jar bomb found lying in the street in Enniskillen, County Fermanagh.
- 6 April 1992:
  - an IRA sniper fired a single shot at a British Army patrol, followed by bursts of automatic fire from a supporting unit, in Mullaghfad, County Fermanagh. The IRA claimed they killed or seriously injured two individuals, including a plainclothes soldier. The British Army denied there were any casualties.
  - a small IRA bomb exploded near Piccadilly Circus in London. There were no injuries.
- 8 April 1992: an IRA unit fired several shots at a joint British Army-RUC checkpoint adjacent to Grosvenor Road RUC station, Belfast.
- 9 April 1992: a primed Mark 12 horizontal mortar was defused by the British Army beside a road at Clogher, County Tyrone.
- 10 April 1992: the IRA detonated a huge truck-bomb at 30 St Mary Axe in the City of London. Despite a warning to evacuate the area, three civilians (Paul Butt, Danielle Carter, and Thomas Casey) were killed and 91 injured. Many buildings were heavily damaged, including the Baltic Exchange.
- 11 April 1992: a large IRA car-bomb exploded at Staples Corner in London causing serious damage to buildings and nearby roads.
- 12 April 1992: a 3 lb (1.4 kg) IRA bomb in a trailer partially exploded in Maghera, County Londonderry. The IRA had attempted to lure RUC officers to the site with a single shot fired at the nearby RUC station.
- 13 April 1992:
  - the IRA claimed responsibility for hoax car bombs left at intersections and outside RUC stations across Belfast.
  - a 500 lb (230 kg) IRA proxy car-bomb was defused outside Castlereagh RUC base.
- 14 April 1992: a 6.6 lb (3.0 kg) Semtex bomb targeting members of the security forces was defused in a builder's yard at Maghera, County Londonderry.
- 15 April 1992:
  - the IRA claimed to have forced the cancellation of a concert for RUC officers in Cookstown, County Tyrone, with two hoax bombs, one a proxy type. The British army carried out a controlled explosion on one of the vehicles.
  - an IRA bomb partially exploded near a shop in Pomeroy, County Tyrone. The device targeted members of British security forces investigating a bomb in the shop; the IRA alleged the owner served the security forces and had recently passed on information to the RUC.
  - the IRA claimed responsibility for a bomb planted under a car owned by a member of the security forces in Florence Court near Enniskillen, County Fermanagh. The device was defused by the British Army.
  - two coffee jar bombs were thrown at a British Army mobile patrol on the Springfield Road, Belfast, but failed to explode.
  - a coffee jar bomb was thrown at a joint British Army/RUC patrol in Sheridan Street in the New Lodge area of Belfast. The device failed to explode.
- 16 April 1992: RUC officers opened fire after a hijacked taxi driven by an IRA member (and carrying a bomb) crashed through a checkpoint in the Poleglass area of Belfast. The driver was later arrested.
- 18 April 1992:
  - Brendan McWilliams, an employee of the British Army, was shot dead by the IRA at his home, Nialls Crescent, off Killylea Road, Armagh. At least 18 shots were fired at him through the front door from a high velocity weapon.
  - an attack on a member of the security forces was foiled when a booby-trap bomb was discovered during a stop at an RUC vehicle checkpoint in Larne, County Antrim. The occupants of the car were arrested.
- 19 April 1992:
  - incendiary devices destroyed a clothing store and a supermarket in Lisnaskea, County Fermanagh. The IRA claimed responsibility.
  - IRA incendiary devices were discovered in three shops in Belfast city centre; only one premises was damaged.
- 22 April 1992: the IRA left a bomb at the Ulster Bank branch at May Street, Belfast.
- 23 April 1992:
  - an IRA unit lobbed a blast bomb at an RUC patrol vehicle in the Markets area of Belfast. The IRA claimed the device struck the windshield, injuring the crew.
  - an IRA unit opened fire on an RUC foot patrol in the Springfield Road area of Belfast. A civilian sitting in a car nearby was injured, and her baby narrowly avoided injury.
- 24 April 1992: the IRA fired several shots at a joint British Army-RUC checkpoint on Craigavon Bridge, Derry.
- 25 April 1992: the IRA reports that two East Tyrone Brigade units opened fire on a British Army foot patrol at Loughmacrory near Carrickmore, County Tyrone.
- 27 April 1992:
  - IRA firebombs damaged the Bellevue Arms bar and Belfast Castle in North Belfast. In a statement the IRA claimed the upstairs room of Belfast Castle was targeted because it was used by senior members of the Northern Ireland Office and RUC, and Bellevue Arms was a meeting place for RUC officers and informers.
  - the IRA claimed responsibility for twenty hoax bomb alerts which caused major disruption to transport links in the Belfast area.
  - the IRA exploded a bomb at Belfast Central station and a bomb at York Road station failed to detonate.
  - a British soldier and a nine-year boy were wounded by a coffee-jar bomb thrown by an IRA unit at a military patrol in the Oldpark area of Belfast.
  - an IRA bomb exploded at a bank premises in Gloucester Street in Belfast city centre. Four RUC officers were treated for minor injuries.
- 28 April 1992:
  - RUC officers fired several warning shots and arrested two men after uncovering a remotely-detonated 5 lb (2.3 kg) Semtex bomb at a builder's yard in Patrick Street, Newry, County Down.
  - the IRA claimed responsibility for a 2 lb (0.91 kg) bomb in a car which failed to detonate outside Lisburn courthouse.
- 29 April 1992: the IRA reported they fired several shots at Rosemount RUC station, Derry.

=== May–June ===
- 1 May 1992:
  - a British soldier (Andrew Grundy) was killed and 23 others were wounded when the IRA used an improvised unmanned locomotive made of a Renault Master van to deliver a bomb to a British Army permanent vehicle checkpoint at Cloghoge, County Armagh. The outpost was completely destroyed (see Attack on Cloghoge checkpoint).
  - an IRA bomb attack was foiled and the device defused after a British Army patrol spotted a command wire near Washingbay Road, Coalisland, County Tyrone.
  - a British security forces patrol escaped injury when a coffee jar bomb failed to detonate in the Hill Street area of Newry.
- 3 May 1992: an incendiary bomb exploded in a business premises in Belfast city centre.
- 4 May 1992:
  - an IRA unit lobbed a coffee jar bomb at a joint British Army-RUC patrol on the Springfield Road, Belfast.
  - a 5.5 lb (2.5 kg) IRA Semtex anti-personnel bomb failed to detonate after RUC officers were lured to a shopping centre in Carrickfergus, County Antrim.
- 5 May 1992:
  - the IRA carried out a bomb attack against a British Army mobile patrol in the Markets area of Belfast.
  - a Mark-12 horizontal mortar, fired by an IRA unit, overshot Rosemount RUC station in Derry city, damaging the base and several houses on Creggan Road. Two soldiers and one civilian were wounded.
- 6 May 1992:
  - an IRA unit lobbed a coffee jar bomb at a British security forces patrol in the Markets area of Belfast.
  - 25 lb (11 kg) explosives planted by the IRA found at the side of a road by a British Army patrol was made safe in Cappagh, County Tyrone.
- 7 May 1992:
  - a 1,000 lb (450 kg) IRA bomb transported by a tractor exploded beside the RUC security base in Fivemiletown, County Tyrone, injuring 10 civilians and causing substantial damage to civilian properties nearby, and structural damage to the barracks itself. The explosion was heard 30 miles away. The IRA South Fermanagh Brigade claimed responsibility. On 9 May a British soldier shot and killed his company's sergeant major (Dean Oliver) in a blue-on-blue incident at the same spot, while taking part of a security detail around the devastated barracks.
  - a British Army patrol in West Belfast escaped injury after a coffee jar bomb thrown at them failed to detonate.
- 8 May 1992: an IRA unit opened fire on a joint British Army-RUC patrol at Beechmount Avenue off the Falls Road, Belfast. A civilian in a van was seriously wounded, however the IRA denied they were responsible and claimed witnesses described the man being hit by British Army return fire.
- 9 May 1992:
  - a number of incendiary devices exploded at the Metro Centre in Gateshead, Tyne and Wear, causing some damage. More incendiary devices were discovered in stores in the complex in the weeks that followed.
  - an IRA bomb exploded accidentally in Mullaghbawn, County Armagh, injuring the IRA volunteer who was assembling it.
  - an IRA unit lobbed a blast bomb at an unmarked armoured RUC car in Lisnaskea, County Fermanagh, but only the detonator exploded.
- 11 May 1992: an IRA unit carried out a coffee jar bomb attack on a British Army patrol vehicle in North Belfast. The IRA claimed to have disabled the vehicle and injured the soldiers inside.
- 12 May 1992:
  - a British Army paratrooper lost both legs after an IRA bomb attack on a military foot patrol near the village of Cappagh, a few miles south of Pomeroy, County Tyrone. The incident triggered a series of clashes between British soldiers and local people in the town of Coalisland, also in County Tyrone, which lasted until 17 May, when an army machine gun was stolen. Unionist officials accused Sinn Féin of instigating the riots. At least three civilians and two soldiers were injured.
  - an IRA unit fired several shots at British security forces at the "Camel's Hump" checkpoint in Strabane, County Tyrone.
- 14 May 1992: the IRA carried out several incendiary bomb attacks in Belfast; two at an auction house on May Street, two at a showroom on Shore Road, one at a bank on May Street. Another was defused at a stationers in Gloucester Street.
- 15 May 1992:
  - incendiary devices exploded in a clothing store and a furniture store in Yorkgate Shopping Complex, Belfast.
  - two incendiary devices detonated in Bow Street Mall, Lisburn.
  - several residences were damaged in the area of Short Strand in Belfast after a suspected IRA bomb attack on a combined RUC/British army patrol.
- 16 May 1992:
  - an IRA unit launched a horizontal mortar from a parked car at an RUC patrol vehicle in the Beechmount Avenue area of Belfast. Reportedly several shots were also fired. The projectile missed its target and landed, unexploded, in a crowded park. There were no reported injuries and two men were arrested afterwards.
  - three RUC officers suffered minor injuries after a coffee jar bomb struck their armoured patrol car in Dungannon, County Tyrone. Some sources claim the vehicle was the target of a horizontally-launched mortar in Thomas Street shortly before midnight.
- 19 May 1992:
  - incendiary devices exploded in a catalogue retailer store in the Cornmarket area of Belfast, causing extensive damage.
  - an IRA operation to kill a man later described in court as a "civilian" in the Castlederg, County Tyrone area was aborted after the unit involved noticed an RUC checkpoint near the village of Killen.
  - an IRA attack was foiled after a primed coffee jar-type blast bomb was found by a British Army patrol at Glenmurray Court off the Monagh Bypass in West Belfast.
- 21 May 1992: the IRA bombed the home of an RUC officer in Belfast, less than a quarter of a mile from the RUC's headquarters. The house was empty as the RUC officer targeted had moved out a month previously because he feared such an attack. An hour later, the British Army defused a 4 lb (1.8 kg) bomb at the home of a former RUC Assistant Chief Constable on North Circular Road.
- 24 May 1992:
  - the IRA carried out a coffee jar bomb attack on a permanent joint British Army-RUC checkpoint at Elize Street, Belfast.
  - a furniture shop in Dungannon, County Tyrone, was extensively damaged in an incendiary bomb attack. A general goods store was also targeted. Four undetonated incendiary devices were found in both premises. A furniture shop in Cookstown, County Tyrone, was also damaged.
  - the IRA carried out several incendiary bomb attacks on commercial premises in Belfast.
- 27 May 1992: the IRA fired several shots at a man they claimed was a leading member of the UDA as he walked along the Springfield Road but he escaped.
- 28 May 1992: an IRA unit fired a sustained burst of automatic fire at North Howard Street barracks, Belfast.
- 29 May 1992:
  - the IRA carried out several incendiary bomb attacks on commercial premises in Belfast; one device detonated in CastleCourt Shopping Centre.
  - an IRA attack on a Wessex helicopter near Cappagh, County Tyrone, using a GPMG stolen during unrest in Coalisland eleven days earlier was foiled by the British Army. One member of the three-man ASU was arrested by the RUC after fleeing a car pursued by the Wessex; the GPMG and other arms were recovered from a farmhouse. Two other members of the IRA unit abandoned the car after setting it on fire. Nationalist politician Bernardette Devlin McAliskey suggested that the recovery of the machine gun was actually staged by the security forces as a publicity stunt.
- 30 May 1992: an IRA unit lobbed a blast bomb containing 1 lb (0.45 kg) of Semtex at an RUC patrol in Monaghan Street, Newry. There were no reported injuries.
- 31 May 1992: an IRA mortar attack in Crossmaglen involved the first use of the Mk-14 mortar bomb.
- 1 June 1992: the IRA claimed responsibility for a 200 lb (91 kg) anti-personnel bomb abandoned at Orritor Street in Cookstown, County Tyrone. British security forces discovered a command wire leading to a derelict building nearby.
- 2 June 1992:
  - an IRA unit carried out a mortar attack on a British Army checkpoint at Mullan Bridge, Kinawley, County Fermanagh.
  - the IRA detonated a 200 lb (91 kg) car bomb at a golf club in Cookstown, County Tyrone. The IRA accused the club of hosting an event for RUC officers two weeks previously. The device went off just as the area was evacuated, and the blast resulted in heavy damage to the premises.
  - a booby-trap bomb attached to an RUC officer's car outside a pub in Derriaghy on the outskirts of Belfast was defused by the British Army.
- 5 June 1992: the IRA lobbed a coffee jar bomb at the home of an off-duty UDR soldier in Castlederg, County Tyrone. The Semtex device failed to explode and was neutralised by the British Army.
- 7 June 1992:
  - a police officer, Glenn Goodman, was shot dead after he stopped the car of an IRA volunteer on the A64 at Tadcaster, North Yorkshire, England. Another officer was shot and badly wounded. IRA volunteers Paul Magee and Michael O'Brien were caught four days later. Magee was charged and convicted of murder, while O'Brien was found guilty of attempted murder.
  - an IRA bomb exploded at the Royal Festival Hall in London, causing blast damage. There were no casualties.
- 8 June 1992:
  - a 1 lb (0.45 kg) Semtex bomb attached to the underside of a vehicle was defused in Tennent Street, Belfast. The IRA claimed the owner was a senior member of the UVF, and this was the third attempt on his life.
  - a 2 lb (0.91 kg) bomb exploded on the third floor of a hotel on Brunswick Street, Belfast. A second device failed to explode in the hotel's restaurant.
  - a bomb hoax at the Europa Hotel, Belfast, forced the evacuation of a "Miss Northern Ireland" event.
  - an IRA unit lobbed two blast bombs at a British Army mobile patrol in the New Barnsley area of Belfast.
- 9 June 1992:
  - the IRA detonated a bomb targeting RUC officers lured to a hoax bomb alert at the home of a UDR soldier in the Antrim Road area of Belfast.
  - incendiary devices detonated in two department stores in Belfast city centre causing minor damage. A hardware store in North Street and a glass merchants in Newtownabbey were also damaged in an incendiary bomb attack.
  - the IRA claimed responsibility for twenty hoax bomb alerts in the greater Belfast area.
  - a "blast incendiary" exploded at a garage at Bridge End in East Belfast. The IRA accused the owner's of serving the RUC.
- 10 June 1992:
  - two incendiary devices detonated in a restaurant in South Belfast.
  - a small IRA bomb exploded in Wilcox Place, London.
  - an IRA van bomb went off outside Braeside Bar at Orritor, near Cookstown, County Tyrone. IRA sources said that the bar's owner "continued collaboration" with British forces motivated the attack. There were no casualties, but the building was engulfed by fire and several houses were wrecked by the blast.
  - a blast bomb dropped from a block of flats onto a British Army foot patrol in the New Lodge area of Belfast failed to explode.
- 12 June 1992: an IRA unit fired on a British Army patrol as they left their base in the New Barnsley area of Belfast.
- 13 June 1992: the IRA carried out a blast bomb attack against Springfield Road RUC station, Belfast.
- 14 June 1992:
  - a coffee jar bomb thrown at British security forces partially exploded in Cupar Street in the Falls Road area of Belfast and was later defused.
  - the IRA claimed responsibility for a 2 lb (0.91 kg) bomb that exploded on the Dublin-Belfast railway between Central and Botanic stations. The line was closed again the following day after several hoax bomb alerts.
- 15 June 1992: an IRA bomb exploded in a hijacked minicab in St. Albans Street, London England.
- 16 June 1992:
  - a 500 lb (230 kg) IRA bomb was found buried beside a culvert with a command wire leading to a firing point nearby, at New Line Road near Cookstown, County Tyrone.
  - an incendiary device detonated inside a business in North Street in Belfast city centre.
- 17 June 1992: an IRA "anti-personnel" bomb near Belfast City Hall wounded five UDR soldiers and two RUC constables.
- 18 June 1992:
  - the IRA claimed they fired over a hundred rounds at a British Army foot patrol at Lackey, County Fermanagh.
  - a primed Mark 12 horizontal mortar concealed in a car in Foyle Road, Derry, was neutralised by the British Army.
- 20 June 1992:
  - the home of a former RUC officer was riddled with gunfire in Pomeroy, County Tyrone. Security forces defused a large IRA booby-trap bomb found under a getaway car used by the IRA unit responsible.
  - Irish security forces discovered an IRA command wire leading across the border from outside Ballyshannon, County Donegal. British security forces were alerted and found an explosive device in County Fermanagh, which was defused.
- 21 June 1992:
  - an IRA coffee jar bomb was thrown at two RUC officers on foot patrol, but failed to explode during a festival in Benburb, County Tyrone.
  - An IRA active service unit fired several shots at Dungannon barracks, County Tyrone. The shooting took place at 4:00 am and there was no return fire. No casualties were reported.
- 22 June 1992: a British army patrol returned fire after coming under attack by IRA snipers along Ballynagilly Road, near Cookstown, County Tyrone. Security forces sealed off the area. No casualties were reported.
- 23 June 1992: the IRA detonated a 10 lb (4.5 kg) Semtex and shrapnel bomb while soldiers and RUC officers were responding to a smaller bomb in a bank in Arthur Street, Belfast. The IRA claimed the action was a repeat of an attack in the same location a week previously and several soldiers and RUC officers were injured.
- 24 June 1992: an IRA unit fired 50 rounds at British soldiers manning an observation post atop a block of flats in the New Lodge area of Belfast.
- 25 June 1992: an IRA briefcase-bomb exploded under a car in Coleman Street, London; a police officer had to be treated for shock.
- 26 June 1992:
  - a 10 lb (4.5 kg) IRA bomb failed to explode at a bank premises in Gloucester Street in Belfast city centre.
  - a pair of horizontal mortars in a van targeting an armoured RUC patrol vehicle failed to detonate in Lisnaskea, County Fermanagh. Both devices were later defused by the British Army.
  - the IRA warned of two bombs planted at banks in Dungannon, County Tyrone. One was a hoax but the second was a viable 5 lb (2.3 kg) device.
  - an IRA hoax bomb caused disruption for several hours in Cookstown, County Tyrone.
- 27 June 1992: two RUC officers narrowly escaped serious injury after an IRA magnetic bomb attached to the roof of their patrol car exploded in the centre of Belfast. The officers dived from their car seconds before the bomb detonated, after a man had placed it and ran away. 21 people were injured.
- 28 June 1992:
  - a 1.5 lb (0.68 kg) booby-trap Semtex bomb attached to the underside of a car belonging to a member of the security forces was neutralised in a controlled explosion at Barranderry Heights, Enniskillen, County Fermanagh.
  - a primed horizontal mortar was found concealed inside a parked car with a hole cut in the side on the Antrim Road by RUC officers. Two men were arrested.
  - a primed horizontal mortar was found by a British Army patrol positioned in the garden of a house near the Ballymurphy Road, West Belfast.
- 29 June 1992:
  - an IRA unit opened fire on a British Army foot patrol in the Twinbrook area of Belfast.
  - IRA members occupied a house in the Derrybeg area of Newry to recover "IRA materials" sealed inside, unknown to the tenants. The IRA's South Down Brigade apologised for any "distress" caused.
- 30 June 1992:
  - the IRA claimed to have left two bombs in Castlederg, County Tyrone. The RUC stated they failed to find the devices after a search; the IRA had previously warned about the two bombs on June 19.
  - a round fired by an IRA sniper at a British Army foot patrol in Glasvney Close in the Dunmurry area of Belfast missed and entered a house, injuring a civilian with flying glass.

=== July–August ===
- 1 July 1992:
  - a 1.5 lb (0.68 kg) bomb concealed in a flag pole failed to detonate in Stewartstown, County Tyrone. The IRA's intended target was RUC officers removing the Irish tricolour from the planned route of an Orange Order parade.
  - an IRA bomb exploded at the junction box at Belfast Central station, disrupting service on the Belfast-Portadown railway.
- 2 July 1992:
  - the IRA admitted responsibility for the killing of three men, whose bodies were found at different roadsides in County Armagh. The IRA claimed the men, all members of the IRA, were undercover agents for MI5 and the RUC Special Branch. See also: Murder of Margaret Perry.
  - the IRA claimed bombs had been placed at four major Belfast hotels. After extensive searches and widespread disruption no devices were found.
- 3 July 1992: an IRA unit threw a coffee jar bomb at a joint British Army-RUC patrol on the Camlough Road, Newry. The device failed to detonate.
- 5 July 1992: an IRA unit fired several shots at the RUC station in Strabane, County Tyrone.
- 7 July 1992:
  - an IRA unit threw two coffee jar bombs at an RUC mobile patrol near New Barnsley RUC-British Army base in West Belfast. RUC officers had been lured outside by an abandoned van, but there were no reported injuries.
  - a coffee jar bomb was defused in Edenderry Park, Banbridge, County Down.
- 9 July 1992: an IRA unit threw a coffee jar bomb at a joint British Army-RUC patrol in Newry. The device failed to detonate.
- 11 July 1992:
  - a horizontal mortar targeting an armoured RUC patrol car failed to detonate in Omagh, County Tyrone.
  - an IRA unit opened fire on a British Army checkpoint in Torrens Avenue on the edge of the Ardoyne area of Belfast.
- 12 July 1992:
  - an IRA unit opened fire on a British security forces cordon in the Ardoyne area of Belfast.
  - an IRA unit opened fire on a British security forces cordon in the Iveagh area of Belfast.
  - the IRA claimed responsibility for a 1 lb (0.45 kg) bomb attached to the underside of a Ford Sierra they alleged was used by a senior member of the UVF in North Belfast. The device was defused by the British Army.
- 13 July 1992:
  - a small IRA bomb targeting British security forces was discovered defused and abandoned on Grosvenor Road, Belfast; the IRA claimed they had been forced to abandon the attack because of the presence of civilians.
  - a 3 lb (1.4 kg) IRA bomb exploded at Finaghy Road North station, Belfast.
  - a British Army sniffer dog was killed and its handler slightly injured in a bomb explosion on the Belfast-Dublin railway line, near Central Station in Belfast.
- 15 July 1992: the IRA bombed the Balmoral Golf Club in south Belfast with two incendiary bombs, causing extensive damage.
- 16 July 1992: the IRA detonated an anti-personnel bomb outside a hotel on the Ormeau Road, Belfast, as British security forces investigated a hoax bomb nearby.
- 21 July 1992:
  - incendiary devices exploded in the Yorkgate Shopping Complex in Belfast city centre.
  - a coffee jar thrown at a joint British Army-RUC patrol failed to explode in the Grosvenor Road area of Belfast.
- 23 July 1992: an IRA unit threw a coffee jar bomb at a passing British Army patrol in Strabane, County Tyrone. The device failed to detonate properly and fifty families were evacuated while the device was defused.
- 24 July 1992: an IRA bomb exploded on the railway line between Belfast Central and Botanic railway stations.
- 26 July 1992: a horizontal mortar attack against British security forces was foiled in the Thomas Street area of Warrenpoint, County Down. One man was arrested and later charged.
- 27 July 1992: an IRA unit opened fire on British Army Royal Irish Regiment soldiers manning a vehicle checkpoint in May Street in Belfast city centre.
- 28 July 1992: an IRA unit dropped two blast bombs onto the roof of an observation post at Whiterock security forces base, Belfast.
- 30 July 1992:
  - the IRA planted several incendiary devices, two of which exploded, in the Metrocentre, Gateshead, Newcastle.
  - two incendiary devices exploded in Milton Keynes, England, causing minimal damage.
  - an IRA rocket hit a lorry in a convoy in Newry allegedly carrying materials to build a new British army checkpoint at Cloghoge, County Armagh. Other sources describe a drogue bomb attack and report the lorry wasn't hit.
  - an improvised grenade was thrown at a British security forces mobile patrol at the rear of Castle Court shopping centre in Belfast.
  - an IRA attack was thwarted when the British Army found a 400 lb (180 kg) bomb with command wire hidden beside a road at Ballsmills Road, Crossmaglen, County Armagh.
- 1 August 1992: an explosion in the centre of Lisnaskea, County Fermanagh, injured one person and damaged several homes. The IRA claimed responsibility.
- 3 August 1992:
  - a 250 lb (110 kg) car bomb exploded on Bedford Street in the centre of Belfast following a warning, injuring several civilians. A second 250 lb (110 kg) car bomb nearby was detonated remotely by the IRA when RUC officers and British soldiers were in the vicinity. The explosions caused widespread damage.
  - a British soldier (Damian Shackleton) was shot dead by an IRA sniper team at Duncairn Avenue, New Lodge, Belfast. Shackleton was in the back roof hatch of an army Land Rover when two IRA members armed with assault rifles fired twenty-eight shots from a block of flats, hitting him in the chest and causing a fatal wound.
  - a British soldier from the Coldstream Guards was seriously wounded in a gun battle with the IRA in Pomeroy, County Tyrone. A second soldier was hit but escaped injury when the round lodged in his gear.
- 4 August 1992: an IRA unit fired sixty shots at a British security forces mobile patrol on the Springfield Road, Belfast.
- 5 August 1992: a caller claiming to represent the IRA warned that a mortar in dangerous condition had been abandoned near Florence Court, County Fermanagh.
- 6 August 1992:
  - six mortar bombs were fired at the new army checkpoint under construction near Cloghoge, County Armagh. The IRA in a statement said five mortar tubes were used, two of which failed to detonate.
  - two incendiary devices were discovered and defused by the British Army in a supermarket in Irvinestown, County Fermanagh.
- 7 August 1992: an under-car booby trap bomb was defused by the British Army in Westway Crescent, Belfast. The IRA claimed it was intended for a member of the security forces; however the family involved had no connections.
- 8 August 1992: IRA units fired several shots at British Army permanent vehicle checkpoints at Killyvilly and Magheravelly in County Fermanagh. There were no reported injuries. The IRA's South Fermanagh Brigade reported they used "heavy machine guns, a general-purpose machine gun, and automatic weapons" and over 1,000 rounds were fired in both attacks.
- 10 August 1992: the IRA detonated a bomb on the Belfast-Dublin railway line as a freight train passed on the outskirts of Belfast.
- 11 August 1992:
  - an IRA unit carried out a blast bomb attack on a security forces patrol but the device failed to explode in the Ardoyne area of Belfast.
  - an IRA unit lobbed an "armour-piercing grenade" at an RUC vehicle in the vicinity of a checkpoint on the Letterkenny Road, Derry. The device failed to explode.
- 12 August 1992:
  - an IRA bomb attack against the West End of London involving a 3,000 lb (1,400 kg) bomb was foiled after armed police raided an apartment in Hanwell, west London.
  - the IRA shot dead a former IRA member they accused of being an informer in Belfast.
  - a member of a three-man IRA unit was shot and injured at a vehicle checkpoint after carrying out a sniper attack in Strabane, County Tyrone. The unit's getaway car was damaged and they fled on foot pursued by an RAF helicopter, at least one of the IRA volunteers fired at the helicopter but no hits were registered. The injured IRA volunteer was eventually arrested nearby.
  - an IRA unit fired several shots at a British Army mobile patrol as they entered Henry Taggart base on the Upper Springfield Road, Belfast.
- 13 August 1992: an unsuccessful attack was launched by a sniper on a British Army patrol at Carran Road, Crossmaglen, County Armagh.
- 15 August 1992:
  - four British soldiers were injured, two seriously, by coffee-jar bombs thrown at a British Army-RUC patrol in the Falls Road area of Belfast. RUC officers fired at the attackers and later arrested an IRA suspect.
  - the British Army defused a blast incendiary bomb left in a hijacked bus in the Creggan area of Derry.
- 17 August 1992: a blast bomb was thrown at an RUC patrol vehicle on Camlough Road, Newry, but failed to explode.
- 19 August 1992: two British soldiers were wounded in an IRA blast bomb attack at Grosvenor road, Belfast. Also, a booby-trap bomb disguised as an unexploded grenade detonated when a technical officer attempted to defuse it.
- 20 August 1992:
  - passengers escaped injury after an IRA incendiary bomb wrecked a train in the Finaghy area of Belfast.
  - British soldiers were injured in an IRA remotely-detonated bomb attack in the Lower Ormeau area of Belfast.
  - an IRA bomb left outside a bank in Cookstown, County Tyrone, failed to detonate and was later defused by the British Army. A second bomb was also defused.
- 21 August 1992:
  - an IRA unit opened fire on British soldiers and civilian contractors at a British Army position in Derry city centre.
  - a civilian (Isobel Leyland), a Belfast native visiting from England, was shot dead in a crossfire by the IRA during a gun battle in Ardoyne with the RUC. The IRA issued a statement after the attack apologising for the killing.
- 22 August 1992:
  - a blast bomb was thrown at an RUC mobile patrol in Kilrea, County Londonderry. The officers were treated for shock afterwards.
  - the IRA was responsible for several bomb hoaxes over three days in Cookstown and Dungannon.
- 24 August 1992: a British soldier was wounded by a coffee-jar bomb in the Twinbrook area of Belfast.
- 25 August 1992:
  - an IRA firebomb exploded in the Shropshire Regimental museum in Shrewsbury Castle, Shropshire, England and two incendiary devices exploded in two furniture shops in Shrewsbury Town Centre.
  - an IRA unit opened fire twice on Gardaí during a chase following an attempted bank raid in Newcastlewest, County Limerick. The officers were unarmed. The raiders' hijacked Mazda van was later found abandoned eight miles from the town.
- 27 August 1992: in a repeat of an attack a week earlier, an IRA unit opened fire on British soldiers and civilian contractors at a British Army position in Derry city centre.
- 28 August 1992: a British soldier (Paul Turner) was shot dead by a sniper in the main square of Crossmaglen, County Armagh. He was taking up position in the main square of the town when he was hit in the chest by a single bullet fired by an IRA sniper some 250 yards (230 metres) away.

=== September–October ===
- 2 September 1992: an IRA attack was foiled and one person arrested after a primed booby-trap bomb along with Semtex explosives and detonator was found at Corrody Road in the Waterside area of Derry. Ten houses were evacuated while the British Army neutralised the explosives.
- 5 September 1992: the IRA stated it had sent bullets to five Protestant businessmen living in Moy, County Tyrone to warn them against servicing members of the British security forces. A fish-and-chip shop in the village closed a few days later.
- 6 September 1992:
  - a 20 lb (9.1 kg) bomb exploded in a Chinese restaurant in Dungannon, County Tyrone. A second, larger, bomb in the vicinity targeting RUC officers on the scene of the first explosion resulted in no reported injuries. The IRA claimed the business served members of the security forces.
  - a small IRA bomb exploded at a Hilton Hotel in the Hyde Park area of London.
  - a 1.5 lb (0.68 kg) Semtex bomb with firing pack and command wire was defused by the British Army at Dunville Park, West Belfast.
- 8 September 1992:
  - the IRA shot and critically wounded a Protestant civilian at his home near Markethill, County Armagh. Afterwards the IRA claimed he was a member of the British Army's Royal Irish Regiment.
  - a bomb exploded inside the perimeter fence of New Barnsley RUC base, Belfast. It was unclear whether it had been thrown by hand or fired from a launcher.
- 11 September 1992:
  - a major IRA operation was foiled by Irish security forces after they arrested a six-man IRA active service unit at St. Johnston, Donegal, along the Derry-Strabane border. A Toyota van hijacked in County Kerry some time previously contained three GPMGs (including an MG3), two AKM rifles, six combat uniforms, 1,000 rounds of ammunition including double-magazines for the rifles, six incendiary devices, two pairs of binoculars, and a radio scanner. It was later alleged in court the IRA men were probably intending to attack a British Army helicopter.
- 12 September 1992: a British soldier was wounded in an IRA remote-detonation bomb attack in Whiterock, Belfast.
- 17 September 1992: one bomb and four firebombs exploded at various locations around London.
- 18 September 1992: a coffee jar bomb thrown by an IRA unit at an RUC patrol failed to explode in the Grosvenor Road area of Belfast.
- 19 September 1992: an RUC officer was injured in a blast bomb attack on a foot patrol on the Whiterock Road, Belfast.
- 23 September 1992: A massive 3,500 lb (1,600 kg) IRA truck-bomb exploded outside the Forensic Science Laboratory at Newtownbreda, South Belfast. The device almost completely demolished the Laboratory and damaged more than 1,000 homes in the surrounding area. The tremors from the blast were felt over 12 miles (19 km) away and the bomb was later assessed as probably the largest device ever detonated in Northern Ireland. There were no injuries in the attack as the IRA had given a 40-minute warning to evacuate the area, although hundreds of residents had to be treated for shock. It was described as being as powerful as a "mini-nuke". The army bomb disposal team attempting to defuse it all lost their hearing, and several military vehicles were damaged.
- 25 September 1992: a van bomb exploded outside the courthouse in Newry, County Down. The IRA claimed the bomb was a "directional device" targeting civilians contractors carrying out repairs.
- 27 September 1992: a 1,000 lb (450 kg) IRA bomb was defused outside the court house in Armagh, County Armagh.
- 28 September 1992:
  - a 500 lb (230 kg) IRA bomb partially exploded outside York Road RUC station, north Belfast.
  - the IRA shot an alleged informer and left him for dead in Belfast, but he eventually survived his wounds.
- 30 September 1992: a UDA member (Harry Black) was shot dead by the IRA at a friend's home, Annadale Flats, Ballynafeigh, Belfast.
- 1 October 1992:
  - a 15-men strong IRA unit, armed with rifles and machine guns, set up several checkpoints around the village of Meigh, County Armagh. They stopped motorists and handed out leaflets accusing two men of criminal activity.
  - the RUC defused a 150 lb (68 kg) bomb in a field at Galbally, near Dungannon, County Tyrone, four days after the IRA warned it had been planted. Six families were evacuated from nearby houses.
  - an IRA unit lobbed a grenade at a British Army patrol in Blackwatertown, County Armagh, but the device failed to explode.
- 3 October 1992:
  - an IRA unit lobbed an "impact grenade" at a British Army armoured vehicle near Henry Taggart base on the Springfield Road, Belfast, but the device failed to detonate properly.
- 4 October 1992:
  - a young Catholic man was shot and wounded near Castlederg, County Tyrone in a botched IRA attack on British security forces. A primed mortar was found nearby.
  - a car bomb containing shrapnel exploded in Newry, County Armagh.
- 5 October: an IRA unit carried out a gun, grenade, and rocket attack against an RUC armoured vehicle in the Ardoyne area of Belfast.
- 7 October 1992: five people were injured when an IRA bomb exploded in Piccadilly, London. Another bomb exploded on Flitcroft Street, London.
- 8 October 1992:
  - one person was injured when an IRA bomb exploded underneath a car in Tooley Street, London. Another bomb exploded on Malcombe Street.
  - an IRA bomb exploded beside a joint British Army/RUC checkpoint in the Short Strand area of Belfast. A soldier and two RUC officers were injured.
  - the IRA detonated a 10 lb (4.5 kg) bomb outside a bank adjacent to the Markets area of Belfast.
- 9 October 1992:
  - an IRA bomb exploded in the carpark of the Royal British Legion building in Southgate, London.
  - two explosive devices blew up outside two shops at Dungannon, County Tyrone, destroying both buildings.
  - an IRA unit lobbed two blast bombs at a British Army checkpoint in Belfast; however only the detonators exploded.
  - the IRA carried out a gun and bomb attack at RUC officers manning a security barrier on Strand Road, Derry.
- 10 October 1992:
  - three British soldiers were injured after two coffee jar bombs were thrown at their patrol in Stewartstown Road, West Belfast.
  - an RUC officer (James Douglas) was shot dead by the IRA in the Monico Bar, Lombard Street, Belfast.
  - an IRA bomb exploded in a kiosk near Paddington Green police station, London, injuring one person. Another IRA exploded at the British Legion Club in Southgate.
- 12 October 1992:
  - an alleged IRA assassination plot targeting Unionist MP Ken Maginnis was foiled after two gunmen were spotted outside Dungannon District Council, County Tyrone. He had survived six previous attempts on his life.
  - an explosive device exploded in a toilet of the Sussex Arms public house in Covent Garden, London, killing one person (David Heffer) and injuring four others.
- 13 October 1992: an RUC officer was injured when a blast bomb was thrown at a patrol in North Belfast.
- 14 October 1992: the IRA detonated a bomb within a newly-opened commercial centre on York Street, Belfast.
- 16 October 1992: an IRA unit fired on a British Army mobile patrol on the Oldpark Road, North Belfast.
- 18 October 1992: a bomb hidden in a coach explodes outside a hotel in Hammersmith, west London. There were no casualties.
- 19 October 1992:
  - the British Army carried out a controlled explosion of a 200 lb (91 kg) car bomb at Dukes Hotel, Belfast.
  - an IRA bomb explodes in Oxenden Street London, leaving two people requiring treatment for shock.
- 20 October 1992:
  - the IRA detonated a bomb on the railway line between Belfast Central and Botanic stations; the IRA claimed their intent was to lure British Security forces into an ambush.
  - a British soldier (Robert Irvine) was shot dead by the IRA at his home in Rasharkin, County Antrim.
  - an unexploded coffee jar bomb was defused by the British Army on the Ballygawley Road, Dungannon, following a statement from the IRA.
- 21 October 1992:
  - three people were injured when an IRA bomb was detonated at the Princess Louise Territorial Army Centre, Hammersmith Road, London. Two more people were wounded when the IRA bombed a railway line in Edmonton, England.
  - the IRA detonated a 200 lb (91 kg) car bomb on the Main Street of Bangor, County Down, injuring six RUC officers and causing extensive damage.
  - an IRA unit fired several shots at civilian contractors and soldiers at the security forces base on Grosvenor Road, Belfast.
- 22 October 1992: a sewage pipe was damaged by an IRA explosive device at Wick Lane, London.
- 23 October 1992:
  - a 1 lb (0.45 kg) Semtex device attached to the underside of a car belonging to Billy Wright a leading UVF loyalist paramilitary (and later leader of the breakaway LVF), was defused in Portadown, County Armagh.
  - a 100 lb (45 kg) IRA car bomb was defused outside Central Station, Belfast.
- 25 October 1992: a small IRA bomb exploded outside the London home of former Secretary of State for Northern Ireland Lord Prior damaging one building and a number of vehicles.
- 28 October 1992:
  - an IRA unit exploded a bomb at the house of deputy governor of Maghaberry prison, County Antrim.
  - a British soldier suffered minor injuries when a bomb exploded as a patrol passed at Glassdrumman crossroads, Crossmaglen, County Armagh.
- 30 October 1992:
  - the IRA detonated a 500 lb (230 kg) van bomb outside Glengormley RUC base, Belfast. Several houses were damaged and a number of civilians and RUC officers injured.
  - a small IRA bomb exploded in a hijacked taxi outside the Cabinet Office in Whitehall, London.
  - the IRA claimed responsibility for a 100 lb (45 kg) car bomb left in the centre of Lisburn. The bomb failed to explode.
- 31 October 1992: the IRA wiped out the IPLO in Belfast after a vicious internal IPLO feud and allegations that it was dealing drugs. The leader of the IPLO's breakaway Belfast Brigade, Sammy Ward, was shot dead in the Short Strand and several other high-ranking members were kneecapped. Their lives were spared on condition that the IPLO surrender and disband immediately. Within a few days both IPLO factions surrendered and disbanded. IPLO units in Newry and Armagh were not attacked and absolved of any involvement in criminality or drug dealing by the IRA.

=== November–December ===
- 5 November 1992: the IRA bombed the newly opened Bank of Ireland branch in Downpatrick, County Down causing extensive damage.
- 6 November 1992:
  - a 100 lb (45 kg) van bomb was defused in the New Lodge area of Belfast. The van had been hijacked and loaded nearby shortly before it was intercepted by British security forces.
  - a 4 lb (1.8 kg) device attached to a dead sheep belonging to a member of the security forces was defused in Newtownstewart, County Tyrone.
- 9 November 1992: an IRA unit fired a Mark 16 improvised shoulder-fired launcher at an RUC patrol vehicle in Divismore Crescent, Belfast, injuring three RUC officers and four British soldiers.
- 12 November 1992: more than thirty families were evacuated from their homes in the Markets area of Belfast while the British Army defused an unexploded coffee jar bomb.
- 13 November 1992: the IRA detonated a 500 lb (230 kg) van-bomb in the centre of Coleraine, County Londonderry, causing extensive damage to the town centre.
- 14 November 1992:
  - an IRA sniper fired a single shot at a British Army foot patrol at Finnegan's Road, Forkhill, County Armagh. No reported injuries.
  - a police officer was shot and injured by the IRA in north London after confronting two men he had spotted acting suspiciously. The two men fled the scene and in a follow-up search a truck-bomb was discovered and defused.
- 15 November 1992:
  - an RUC officer (Alan Corbett) was shot dead by an IRA sniper while manning a vehicle checkpoint in Belcoo, County Fermanagh. It emerged that the sniper used an AK-47 assault rifle equipped with a night-sight and fired a single shot from high ground on the County Cavan side of the border. Other sources claim a Barret .50 calibre rifle fitted with a night-sight was used.
  - IRA members parked a van containing a large bomb at the base of One Canada Square tower in Canary Wharf, London. They drew a handgun when confronted by security guards and escaped in a second van, which was later found "about two miles away" with a quantity of explosives inside.
- 18 November 1992: a sweet jar filled with Semtex was thrown at a British Army patrol on the Springfield Road, Belfast, but failed to explode.
- 19 November 1992: an off-duty British soldier (Ian Warnock) was shot dead in Portadown, County Armagh. He was shot at least 12 times by an IRA volunteer who fired at close range. The soldier managed to return fire but is not believed to have hit any of his assailants.
- 20 November 1992: the IRA lobbed a coffee jar bomb at an RUC vehicle in Lisfannon Park, Derry. Later, a second coffee jar bomb attack was carried out against British soldiers manning a cordon nearby.
- 21 November 1992:
  - an alleged informer (Gerard Holmes) was shot dead by the IRA in the Creggan area of Derry.
  - two British soldiers were injured when an IRA bomb exploded in a disused fast food shop on the Falls Road, opposite Dunville Park, Belfast.
- 23 November 1992:
  - the IRA bombed a bank premises in Gloucester Street in Belfast city centre.
  - British security forces defused a 700 lb (320 kg) IRA car bomb in Chichester Street in Belfast city centre. There were also several hoax bombs.
- 24 November 1992:
  - an IRA unit exchanged fire with a combined British Army/RUC patrol at Castlederg, County Tyrone. The IRA members had been surprised outside the house of a Royal Irish Regiment soldier. More than 70 shots were fired.
  - four RUC officers were injured in Belfast by an IRA jar-bomb.
  - two coffee jar bombs were thrown at Grosvenor Road RUC station, causing no injuries and minimal damage. Two RUC officers were injured in a follow-up operation when they crashed their vehicle.
- 25 November 1992: an IRA volunteer (Pearse Jordan) was shot dead by the RUC after his car was rammed by an undercover RUC vehicle in Belfast. After stumbling out of the car unarmed, Jordan was shot three times in the back by an RUC sergeant.
- 26 November 1992: the IRA carried out incendiary bomb attacks on two large chain hardware stores in the Waterside area of Derry.
- 29 November 1992: an IRA landmine intended for a British Army patrol exploded outside Armagh city, wounding six people and damaging several houses.
- 30 November 1992: an IRA Semtex bomb surrounded by shrapnel, intended for British security forces, was found planted beside a primary school in Pomeroy, County Tyrone. An IRA statement claimed that the attack was abandoned when British undercover forces attempted to ambush the unit involved in the operation.
- 1 December 1992:
  - the IRA detonated a bomb in Ann Street, Belfast, damaging several businesses and injuring 27 people.
  - the IRA detonated a bomb at a car parts business in Ormeau Avenue, Belfast.
  - an IRA van-bomb was made safe by the British Army in London after a telephoned warning.
  - an IRA unit fired a rocket at a British Army outpost atop a high-rise apartment block in the New Lodge area of Belfast.
- 2 December 1992:
  - Police disarmed a 1,000 lb (450 kg) van bomb left in the West End of London, following an IRA warning.
  - upwards of fifty hoax bomb alerts caused major disruption in Belfast.
- 3 December 1992:
  - the IRA detonated an incendiary device in a shoe shop on the Crumlin Road, Belfast.
  - the IRA detonated two small bombs in Manchester, England; 64 people were injured. The explosion resulted in £20 million damage.
- 4 December 1992:
  - the Provisional IRA was blamed for shooting dead a man (Colm Duffy) at his farm near Collon, County Louth. He had been subject to an IRA punishment shooting several years earlier in Carrickmacross, County Monaghan.
  - four incendiary devices exploded in a crowded supermarket in Lisburn. The IRA was blamed.
  - two incendiary devices were discovered in a bar in Omagh, County Tyrone.
- 7 December 1992:
  - the first barrack-buster mortar was launched against an RUC barracks in Ballygawley, County Tyrone. The attack failed when the projectile fell short of the perimeter fence and hit a tree without exploding.
  - an IRA unit fired several shots at observations posts of the British Army Lisanelly barracks in Omagh, County Tyrone.
- 8 December 1992: according to the IRA, a 200 lb (91 kg) landmine detonated prematurely when a farm animal walked on it near Cappagh, County Tyrone.
- 9 December 1992:
  - the IRA detonated two car-bombs in a multi-storey car park on Chichester Street, Belfast City centre.
  - a bomb planted in an electrical store on the Ormeau Road, Belfast, was taken outside where it exploded causing minor damage.
  - in London, an IRA truck-bomb partially exploded in Woodside Park.
  - the IRA carried out a coffee jar bomb attack against an RUC patrol in the Westland Park area of Derry. No reported injuries.
- 10 December 1992:
  - two IRA bombs explode at Wood Green shopping centre in London injuring 11 people.
  - an IRA booby-trap bomb in a lorry left in a coal yard overnight was defused by the British Army in Moy, County Tyrone.
- 11 December 1992: a sniper fired a single shot at a British Army foot patrol in Belleek, County Fermanagh. There were no reported injuries and fire wasn't returned.
- 12 December 1992:
  - an IRA unit attacked a British Army watchtower—the Crossmaglen RUC Station and Army Barracks, also known as the Borucki Sanger Golf Five Zero—with an improvised flamethrower towed by a tractor in Crossmaglen, County Armagh. It was named for James Borucki, a British soldier who died in an IRA bombing in Crossmaglen on 8 August 1976. The device consisted of a manure spreader which doused the facility with fuel, ignited few seconds later by a small explosion. The outpost was manned by soldiers of the Royal Scots at the time. No wounded were reported.
  - British security forces found and defused a Semtex bomb hidden behind a wall with command wire on the Glenalena Road in the Ballymurphy area of Belfast.
  - an IRA unit fired a heavy machine gun at British soldiers manning a permanent vehicle checkpoint at Annaghmartin, County Fermanagh.
  - the IRA launched two mortar bombs at Roslea RUC base, County Fermanagh, with one penetrating a perimeter fence. No injuries were reported.
- 13 December 1992:
  - an IRA unit fired several shots at a British Army watchtower on the Oldpark Road, North Belfast.
  - a Catholic civilian (John Collett) died five days after a severe IRA punishment shooting at his home in Drumleck Gardens, Derry.
- 15 December 1992: an IRA unit carried out a gun and grenade attack against British security forces mobile patrol in the Ballymurphy area of West Belfast.
- 16 December 1992: an IRA bomb exploded inside the John Lewis department store on Oxford Street, London. A second bomb exploded at a nearby cab rank on Cavendish Square as emergency services were evacuating people from the scene of the first device. At least two people were injured.
- 18 December 1992:
  - the IRA launched five mortar projectiles at the RUC base at Markethill, County Armagh but only one detonated. There were no reported injuries and damage was minimal.
  - the IRA fired a rocket at a security post outside the courthouse in London Street, Derry.
- 19 December 1992: an incendiary device was discovered in a chemist's shop in CastleCourt shopping centre, Belfast. It was taken outside and defused.
- 20 December 1992:
  - a small bomb exploded at a bank in Market Street, Belfast.
  - a British soldier was given a box of chocolates by a female motorist at a checkpoint in Cookstown, County Tyrone. Later, British Army experts found and defused a 1 kg Semtex device inside. The IRA is suspected.
- 21 December 1992:
  - the IRA fired several shots at a British Army sangar in Crossmaglen, County Armagh. There were no reported injuries.
  - an IRA bomb failed to explode in an electronics shop on the Ormeau Road, Belfast.
  - the British Army defused a 1,200 lb (540 kg) roadside bomb near Belleeks, County Armagh.
- 22 December 1992:
  - a small IRA bomb exploded at Hampstead underground station in England. There were no injuries.
  - a coffee jar bomb thrown at a British security forces patrol failed to detonate in the Creggan area of Derry.
  - the British Army discovered a concealed horizontal mortar on the Andersonstown Road Belfast. It was later defused.
- 24 December 1992:
  - the IRA (using a recognised code word) caused disruption in several cities in England with hoax bomb warnings.
  - the IRA called a three-day ceasefire.
- 27 December 1992: two coffee-jar bombs were thrown at a police station in Rosemount, Derry, thereby ending the IRA's 3 day ceasefire.
- 29 December 1992: an IRA car bomb extensively damaged the Drumkeen Hotel in south Belfast.
- 30 December 1992:
  - a British soldier was shot dead at his home in Cavehill Road, Belfast by two IRA volunteers who burst into the house armed with AK-47 assault rifles and shot the soldier at least 13 times at close range. The soldier's wife claimed that IRA volunteer Thomas Begley was one of the gunmen.
  - an IRA incendiary bomb exploded at a hotel in County Fermanagh,
  - an IRA unit threw a blast bomb at a British Army foot patrol on the Andersontown Road, Belfast.
  - the IRA bombed the Ormeau Road, Belfast, premises of a building firm they accused of working for British security forces.
- 31 December 1992: IRA members threw a coffee jar bomb at Strand Road RUC station, Derry.

== 1993 ==
=== January–February ===
- 1 January 1993:
  - a 1 lb (0.45 kg) anti-personnel semtex bomb left by the IRA in a hairdressing salon on Royal Avenue, Belfast was defused by the British Army.
  - eight buses were damaged or destroyed in an incendiary bomb attack at a Derry bus depot.
- 2 January 1993:
  - a joint British Army/RUC vehicle patrol was the target of a coffee-jar bomb thrown by an IRA unit in North Belfast.
  - a coffee-jar bomb was thrown at another joint British Army/RUC in the Creggan area of Derry.
- 5 January 1993:
  - three soldiers were injured by a bomb in Belfast while evacuating Belfast's City Hall area after a warning was issued by an IRA telephone call.
  - an IRA sniper fired a single shot at a British Army patrol near Crossmaglen.
- 6 January 1993:
  - parts of London were cordoned off after IRA firebombs exploded in a number of stores.
  - a 25 lb (11 kg) explosive device detonated in Dungannon, County Tyrone, causing minor damage and no victims. Only the detonator had exploded, the main charge had failed to ignite.
- 7 January 1993:
  - an IRA unit opened fire on New Barnsley RUC station, Belfast. There were no reported injuries.
  - the IRA planted two bombs at an oil and gas storage depot in East Belfast. One bomb partially exploded but didn't cause any damage and the other was defused by the British Army.
  - an IRA bomb was defused in a bookshop in London.
- 8 January 1993: a British Army post was hit by two IRA mortar bombs and a Lynx helicopter attacked with machine-gun fire at the border near Kinawley, County Fermanagh. The IRA unit was engaged by a Lynx door-gunner using a GPMG.
- 10 January 1993: the IRA detonated an anti-personnel bomb at a shop in Belfast city centre after luring RUC officers to the site with a staged robbery.
- 11 January 1993:
  - a bomb exploded under the car of a member of the security forces in Glengormley, County Antrim, but there were no reported injuries.
  - the victim of an IRA punishment attack in Dungannon, County Tyrone, had to have one of his legs amputated.
  - an IRA unit launched a rocket at an RUC base in Donegall Pass in south Belfast.
  - a former sergeant of the B-Specials (Matthew Boyd) was shot dead while driving his car along Donaghmore Road, Dungannon, County Tyrone. The IRA claimed the man was a UVF commander, responsible for the killings of Catholic civilians. This was denied by the dead man's family. CAIN lists Boyd as a Protestant civilian.
- 13 January 1993: a 30 lb (14 kg) bomb intended for security forces investigating the assassination of Matthew Boyd was defused at Dungannon, County Tyrone.
- 14 January 1993:
  - the IRA fired a rocket at an RUC vehicle shortly after it left Strand Road RUC headquarters in Derry.
  - the IRA fired a mortar at an RUC base in Andersonstown, Belfast.
- 15 January 1993: the IRA exploded two bombs in Belfast, one of which ignited a fire that destroyed a car showroom.
- 16 January 1993: an RUC Reserve officer was injured by an under-car booby trap bomb in Lisnaskea, County Fermanagh.
- 18 January 1993:
  - British security forces escaped injury in a coffee jar bomb attack in Carrickmore, County Tyrone. Author Brendan O'Brien states that an IRA bomb blast targeted an Army and RUC patrol in Main Street, Carrickmore, approximately by this date, but he reports "a few injuries".
  - the IRA carried out a coffee jar bomb attack against a British Army Saxon APC on the Stewartstown Road in West Belfast.
- 19 January 1993:
  - the IRA's East Tyrone Brigade claimed that their volunteers uncovered and destroyed a British army observation post concealed in a derelict house in Drumcairne Forest, near Stewartstown, County Tyrone. The same source claimed a British helicopter, a military ambulance and ground troops arrived to the scene shortly after, and that local residents believed that two soldiers had been wounded. Press reports say that in fact a derelict house on Castlefarm Road was destroyed by an explosion and subsequent fire, but that there were no security forces in the area at that time.
  - an IRA unit fired several shots at the British Army watchtower overlooking the main square in Crossmaglen, County Armagh. Two British soldiers were injured by splintered glass.
- 20 January 1993:
  - the IRA launched a barrack buster mortar attack on Clogher RUC base in County Tyrone, causing considerable damage to the building. Several RUC members received minor wounds.
  - an IRA bomb attack was foiled by the RUC after they intercepted a vehicle driven by a pair of armed IRA members (one of them the brother of republican Danny Morrison) carrying two Semtex bombs intended for Belfast City Airport, at a checkpoint on the Newtownards Road, Belfast.
- 22 January 1993: an off-duty British soldier and a gunman were injured in a shoot-out at Newtownstewart, County Tyrone.
- 23 January 1993:
  - an RUC officer (Michael Ferguson) was shot dead by the IRA while on foot patrol on Shipquay Street, Derry. He was shot twice in the back of the head at close range by a lone gunman.
  - the IRA claimed that a 600 lb (270 kg) culvert bomb targeting a British vehicle patrol failed to explode at Cappagh, County Tyrone.
  - Sean Berryman, a man from County Donegal, was abducted at Buncrana, interrogated and released unharmed on 26 January.
- 24 January 1993: an IRA unit fired 200 machine gun rounds at a British army outpost at Newtownbutler, County Fermanagh.
- 25 January 1993:
  - a bomb placed beneath an RUC officer's car was defused in Lisnaskea, County Fermanagh.
  - two IRA incendiary devices were discovered in a shopping centre in Newtownabbey, north Belfast following a telephoned warning. A third device couldn't be located.
  - an IRA unit carried out a sustained machine gun attack against a British Army observation at Killyvilly, County Fermanagh.
- 27 January 1993: English IRA men Jan Taylor and Patrick Hayes plant a bomb outside Harrods, London; it injures four people.
- 29 January 1993: a small IRA Semtex device was found planted in a canteen used by loyalist prisoners in Crumlin Road Prison, Belfast.
- 30 January 1993: an IRA incendiary bomb exploded inside a department store in the Richmond Centre, Derry. There were also two hoax bomb alerts in The Diamond and Ferry Quay Street. The IRA were apparently trying to interfere with RUC officers investigating the shooting of officer Michael Ferguson.
- 1 February 1993:
  - a rocket was fired at a British Army mobile patrol on the Andersonstown Road, Belfast.
  - a coffee jar bomb was thrown at RUC officers on the Crumlin Road, Belfast.
  - an off-duty British Army RIR soldier fired a number of shots during an IRA assassination attempt near his home in Ballymagorry near Strabane, County Tyrone.
- 3 February 1993:
  - two small IRA bombs exploded in England. One at South Kensington underground station in London and the other at Kent House railway station.
  - an IRA unit fired several shots at a joint British Army-RUC patrol in the Ardoyne area of Belfast.
- 4 February 1993:
  - a civilian worker was seriously injured after the IRA launched a mortar attack on the joint RUC/British Army barracks in Crossmaglen, County Armagh. The base was heavily damaged.
  - an IRA unit fired half a dozen rounds at a British security forces checkpoint on Corporation Street, near Belfast's Docks area.
- 5 February 1993: an IRA unit tried to assassinate a leading loyalist paramilitary figure in Tavanagh Street, Belfast. The IRA members failed to find their target and opened fire after being confronted by a hostile crowd.
- 6 February 1993: the IRA fired a Mark-16 grenade at a British Army patrol on Ross Street, Belfast.
- 8 February 1993: A British soldier was ambushed and wounded while on foot patrol on Dunville Street, Belfast. Two IRA members fired a shotgun at the patrol from a house whose inhabitants they held captive. The full impact of the blast was taken by the soldier's helmet, which saved his life. The two volunteers were taken in custody some time later.
- 9 February 1993:
  - a British soldier (Michael Beswick) was killed and four others badly wounded when three IRA remote-controlled bombs, affixed to a nearby wall and two pillars on both sides of the street, detonated as a foot patrol passed on Cathedral Road, Armagh town.
  - an armed IRA assassination unit was spotted in Union Street, Portadown, attempting to kill leading UVF member Billy Wright; however he escaped and no shots were fired.
- 10 February 1993:
  - a small IRA bomb exploded in a residential area of London.
  - a British soldier was slightly injured after a coffee jar bomb was thrown at a joint British Army-RUC patrol in West Belfast.
- 11 February 1993: an IRA assassination attempt in the Shankill area of Belfast was aborted after their target failed to appear. A group of gunmen claiming to be members of the UVF had forcibly occupied a house opposite the home of a senior loyalist on Upper Glenfarne Street.
- 12 February 1993: an IRA member (Christopher Harte) was found shot dead in a ditch by the side of Carn Road, near Castlederg, County Tyrone. The IRA alleged he was an informer.
- 13 February 1993:
  - an IRA team shot and injured leading UDA member Joe Bratty outside a bar in the Ormeau area of south Belfast. It was the fourth attempt on his life in 15 months. The IRA finally succeeded in killing Bratty, along with another UDA man, in July 1994.
  - an incendiary bomb was found and defused in a clothes shop in Wellington Place in Belfast city centre.
- 15 February 1993: Mervyn Johnson, a Royal Irish Regiment (RIR) soldier, was shot dead by the IRA outside his home, Highfern Gardens, Highfield, Belfast. He was walking down the street when a car drew alongside and fired a burst of shots from an AK-47 assault rifle, hitting the soldier four times. As he lay wounded a second gunman stepped out of the car and shot the victim three times in the head with a handgun.
- 20 February 1993:
  - a rocket injured four British soldiers when it hit their patrol vehicle in the Woodburn area of Belfast.
  - three Protestant male civilians were shot and injured at a bar in Belfast; the IRA claimed one was a soldier in the Royal Irish Regiment (RIR).
- 21 February 1993: Dunnes Stores in the Park Centre, Belfast, was firebombed by the IRA.
- 22 February 1993: two RUC officers were injured in an IRA bomb attack on a base in Bishop Street, Derry.
- 24 February 1993: an RUC officer (Reginald Williamson) was killed by an IRA booby-trap bomb attached to his car, which exploded while he travelled along Lislasley Road, near Loughgall, County Armagh.
- 25 February 1993: an RUC officer (Jonathan Reid) was shot dead by a sniper while on joint British Army and RUC foot patrol in Crossmaglen, County Armagh. He was taking cover at the side of a road. When he stood up he was hit by a single bullet which struck him in the chest.
- 26 February 1993:
  - a police officer was shot and injured by the IRA in Warrington, England after stopping a suspect car. Three bombs later exploded at the nearby gasworks causing extensive damage.
  - the IRA shot and wounded a man in a shopping center at Newry, County Down. The IRA claimed he was a high-profile drug dealer who had previously been arrested trying to import cannabis and apmehtmaine.
  - a 66-year-old Protestant woman was critically injured after gunmen fired through a window of her home in Armagh town after mistaking her for an RUC detective who formerly lived at the property.
  - the IRA claimed a mortar attack on the RUC base in Tempo, County Fermanagh, was unsuccessful after a firing mechanism failed to detonate. The RUC reported that a single projectile landed inside the base but didn't explode.
- 27 February 1993:
  - the IRA detonated a bomb at Camden Market in London; 18 people were injured.
  - an IRA unit fired several rounds at British security forces establishing a checkpoint beside Belfast city centre, from a position near the New Lodge area.
- 28 February 1993:
  - an IRA unit fired on a British Army checkpoint in Belfast city centre.
  - an IRA unit assembled and launched a "barrack buster" mortar in a demonstration for journalists near Scotstown, County Monaghan.

=== March–April ===
- 1 March 1993: an IRA unit launched two mortar bombs at an RUC base in Bessbrook, County Armagh; at least 11 people were injured and more than 90 houses suffered damage.
- 2 March 1993: shots were fired at anti-terrorist detectives and a police tactical firearms unit raiding a home in north London in connection with the recent IRA bombing of Harrods. Two men were arrested and a large cache of weapons and explosives captured.
- 4 March 1993: an IRA unit opened fire on an alleged "collaborator" as he drove along Cherry Road in Twinbrook, West Belfast.
- 6 March 1993: Philip Martin, a former UDR/RIR soldier escaped injury when he was shot at outside his home in Pomeroy, County Tyrone, while in company of his two children. His brother, also a former UDR member, was killed just six weeks later when a booby-trap attached to his car exploded near Kildress. Martin had left the RIR after being injured by an IRA bomb in Stewartstown. The IRA claimed he was a member of the UVF.
- 7 March 1993:
  - four RUC officers were badly injured when the IRA detonated a car-bomb on the Main Street of Bangor, County Down.
  - an IRA unit attempted to kill two leading loyalists on Berlin Street in the Shankill area of Belfast. One was moderately wounded after their car was riddled with gunfire. The uninjured man had already survived a previous IRA assassination attempt in February and the injured man had been targeted by the INLA in January but they killed a civilian in a case of mistaken identity.
  - an RUC officer was shot and injured at a checkpoint outside an RUC station on Grosvenor Road, Belfast. IRA members had driven up to the checkpoint and fired several shots before lobbing a grenade.
- 8 March 1993:
  - two RUC officers and three civilians were wounded by an IRA bomb blast beside a security gate in Carnegie Street, Lurgan, County Armagh.
  - the IRA launched a mortar attack on Keady British Army barracks, County Armagh. A civilian contractor for the British Army (Nigel McCollum) who was working at the base was killed when three barrack buster mortars were fired into the compound. He had been operating a crane when it was struck by one of the mortars. McCollum's brother (Reginald McCollum), an off-duty RIR soldier, would be killed a year later, in 1994, by the IRA; their grandmother (Lilly McCollum) had been killed in 1983 in a republican attack on her brother, a member of the UDR.
- 9 March 1993:
  - the IRA took over two houses in the Woodburn area of Belfast and fired a rocket from a window at a British foot patrol.
  - an off-duty British Army RIR soldier was shot and wounded by the IRA as he drove out of a bus depot in east Belfast.
- 10 March 1993: Norman Truesdale was shot dead by two IRA volunteers who entered his shop in Oldpark, Belfast. The first volunteer shot Truesdale a number of times in the chest at close range and the second shot him with an AK-47 assault rifle as he lay wounded on the floor. Truesdale's family denied he was a member of any paramilitary group, but he is listed in CAIN as a member of the Ulster Defence Association (UDA).
- 11 March 1993:
  - the IRA claimed responsibility for several hoax car bombs left in Lisburn and Belfast. causing widespread disruption.
  - an IRA unit fired 40 rounds at an observation post at Woodbourne RUC base, Belfast.
  - an IRA unit fired several shots at a British Army RIR checkpoint in Oxford Street beside the High Court in Belfast city centre.
  - a booby-trap bomb fell off the underside of a car driven by an RUC officer in Glengormley, County Antrim.
- 12 March 1993: a blast bomb thrown at a British Army patrol in Shambles Lane, Dungannon, County Tyrone, failed to explode and was later defused.
- 13 March 1993:
  - the IRA mortared a British Army observation post at Glasdrumman, County Armagh.
  - an IRA incendiary device exploded in a furniture store in the Waterside area of Derry, causing minor damage. A second device was found in a follow-up search.
  - an IRA unit detonated a 2 lb (0.91 kg) bomb by command wire as a British Army patrol passed in the New Barnsley area of Belfast, injuring a soldier.
- 14 March 1993:
  - a 10 lb (4.5 kg) bomb detonated outside a bank in Gloucester Street in Belfast city centre. A second device was defused nearby in Adelaide Street.
  - a 10 lb (4.5 kg) bomb was left in a post office in Strabane, County Tyrone, by an unmasked youth who gave a warning. Only the detonator exploded.
- 17 March 1993:
  - two contractors linked to the British Army and RUC escaped injury when a bomb exploded under their van near Aghadowey, County Londonderry. One of the men, Alan Smith, was a former UDR member and active UDA gunman and was eventually shot dead by the IRA in April 1994.
  - a British soldier (Lawrence Dickson) was shot dead by a sniper in Forkill, County Armagh. The patrol were in pursuit of a man who had been acting suspiciously when a single high velocity shot was fired by a sniper who is believed to have been in a nearby vehicle. The bullet hit the soldier in the side and he died a short time later. Another British soldier returned fire at the vehicle but scored no hits.
- 20 March 1993:
  - two IRA bombs exploded in Warrington, England, killing two children (Johnathan Ball and Tim Parry) and injuring more than 50 people. A coded but inaccurate warning was issued to the Samaritans, which, police said, placed the bomb outside a Boots chemist shop in Liverpool, 16 miles (26 km) away from Boots in Warrington, where the detonation occurred.
  - a British Army patrol escaped injury after a bomb hidden in a bus shelter detonated as they passed in Derry.
- 21 March 1993: the IRA launched a grenade or rocket at an RUC patrol vehicle on Ardglass Road, Downpatrick, County Down. A second patrol returned fire. Two men were later arrested and a firearm recovered.
- 24 March 1993:
  - an IRA bomb damaged an auction house at the junction of May Street and Montgomery Street in Belfast city centre.
  - several shots were fired at the joint British Army/RUC base in Rathfriland, County Down.
- 25 March 1993: there was a multiple weapons attack by the IRA on a British Army watchtower, the Borucki sangar, in Crossmaglen, County Armagh.
- 30 March 1993: the IRA claimed to have thwarted a British Army undercover operation by detonating a bomb at the Glen, between Loughmacrory and Mountfield, County Tyrone, on Mulnafye road. The RUC reported that an explosion occurred while a joint RUC-British Army patrol were in the vicinity, and also in a follow-up operation a buried 264 lb (120 kg) roadside bomb and a command wire were discovered. The IRA denied any explosives were found in a later statement.
- 31 March 1993:
  - a 500 lb (230 kg) IRA bomb left in the back of a car outside a government building in Belfast was defused.
  - an IRA sniper fired a single shot at a British Army foot patrol on the Oldpark Road, Belfast.
- 1 April 1993: an IRA sniper fired a single shot in the Carlisle Square area of Belfast as the British Army dealt with several bomb hoaxes in the city.
- 2 April 1993: an IRA unit fired over a hundred rounds at a permanent British Army vehicle checkpoint at Kilturk near Newtownbutler, County Fermanagh.
- 3 April 1993: a British soldier was shot and injured by the IRA near Crossmaglen, South Armagh.
- 4 April 1993: a British Army patrol was attacked with what the IRA described as an "improvised flamethrower" in Carrickmore, County Tyrone. The device consisted of 2 lb (0.91 kg) of Semtex and five gallons of petrol; the bomb exploded, but the fuel failed to ignite. A soldier was thrown several meters across the road by the blast. The patrol was attacked in the afternoon when they approached the intersection of Creggan road and Rockstown road.
- 6 April 1993: a bomb exploded at Belfast Central Station. The area had been evacuated following a warning and there were no injuries.
- 7 April 1993:
  - three British soldiers were wounded when the IRA mortared their base in Crossmaglen.
  - the IRA detonated a bomb at a Conservative Party club in Argyle Square, London.
  - a joint British Army-RUC patrol detected a command wire hidden in long grass beside Whiterock Road, Belfast. A soldier had been seriously injured in an attack at the same location nine months earlier.
- 8 April 1993: a rocket was fired at a joint British Army/RUC patrol near Woodbourne RUC station, Belfast.
- 10 April 1993: a 300 lb (140 kg) IRA car bomb was defused outside government offices on Victoria Street in Belfast city centre.
- 14 April 1993:
  - a 10 lb (4.5 kg) bomb left in a gas cylinder outside CastleCourt shopping centre, Belfast, was defused.
  - a 10 lb (4.5 kg) bomb left in a bank at Carlisle Circus, Belfast, was defused.
- 15 April 1993: an IRA unit lobbed a coffee jar bomb at a British Army mobile patrol on the outskirts of the Andersonstown area of Belfast.
- 16 April 1993: British security forces defused a Semtex and shrapnel anti-personnel bomb found on a bank of the River Mourne in Strabane, County Tyrone.
- 17 April 1993: rail services between Belfast and Dublin were disrupted after an IRA bomb exploded along the track near Belfast Central Station.
- 19 April 1993: an IRA bomb fell off a target's car and was smashed under the wheels of passing vehicles before being defused by the British Army near Tobermore, County Londonderry.
- 20 April 1993: an IRA bomb exploded beside the security gate at Bishop's Gate in Derry city centre.
- 21 April 1993: the IRA planted a booby-trap bomb under an RUC officer's car in the centre of Banbridge, County Down, but it fell off and was defused.
- 22 April 1993: the small South Armagh village of Cullaville, along the border with the Republic, was taken over by an IRA unit for two hours (see Occupation of Cullaville).
- 23 April 1993:
  - a small IRA bomb detonated at an Esso oil refinery in North Shields, England, causing moderate damage.
  - an IRA sniper fired a single shot at British soldiers at the base of a watchtower in the New Lodge area of Belfast; one British soldier suffered shock.
- 24 April 1993:
  - the IRA detonated a huge truck bomb at Bishopsgate in the City of London, which killed one person and injured 44 more. The explosion caused damage estimated at £350 million. The police confirmed the IRA had phoned in 18 accurate warnings before the explosion. The man who was killed (Eddie Henty) was a press photographer who appears to have slipped through the security cordon to obtain footage of the explosion. The device delivered the equivalent to 1,200 kg. of TNT, and was compared with the power of a tactical nuclear device by some sources.
  - two bombs exploded in hijacked minicabs in London, but there were no injuries.
- 25 April 1993:
  - a former UDR soldier (David Martin) was killed when an IRA booby trap exploded underneath his car while travelling along Flo Road, Kildress, near Cookstown, County Tyrone.
  - the British Army neutralised a 10 lb (4.5 kg) bomb at a bank at Finaghy Crossroads, Belfast, with two controlled explosions.
- 26 April 1993:
  - the IRA attacked a British Army position near the Fury river, not far from Clogher, County Tyrone, with a lighter variant of the 'Barrack Buster' mortar. The British Army reported that a 100 lb (45 kg) device exploded at County Bridge between Aughnacloy and Augher when a British Army foot patrol was in the vicinity.
  - the IRA attacked a British security forces mobile patrol with a coffee jar bomb on Racecourse Road, Derry.
  - an IRA command wire-detonated bomb consisting of Semtex and shrapnel hidden in a road sign at a junction was defused in Armagh city.
- 27 April 1993:
  - a 50 lb (23 kg) bomb in a gas cylinder was discovered and defused by the British Army at Corrigan Park in the Whiterock area of Belfast. The device was connected to a firing-pack by a command wire.
- 30 April 1993: the IRA launched a horizontal mortar at an RUC mobile patrol at Ballygawley roundabout, County Tyrone. The projectile missed the leading vehicle, and exploded on a roadside wall.

=== May–June ===
- 3 May 1993: an IRA unit fired several shots at a British Army patrol at the junction of the New Lodge Road and North Queen Street.
- 5 May 1993: the IRA lobbed a coffee jar bomb at a British security forces patrol in the Ardoyne area of Belfast.
- 6 May 1993:
  - a British RIR soldier was badly injured by an IRA bomb attached to his car that exploded in Lurgan, County Armagh.
  - an IRA unit detonated a 200 lb (91 kg) landmine as several British Army vehicles passed in Blackwatertown, County Armagh.
- 9 May 1993:
  - two IRA incendiary devices ignited in the Galleries shopping centre in Bristol, causing damage but no injuries.
  - the IRA reported they had disarmed a 120 lb (54 kg) roadside bomb in Bellaghy, County Londonderry after spotting covert British soldiers. The device was defused by the British Army a week later.
- 11 May 1993:
  - an IRA "Barrack Buster" mortar attack forced the evacuation of the RUC barracks at Caledon, County Tyrone, though the warhead did not explode.
  - a horizontal mortar launched at a British security forces vehicle missed in Portadown, County Armagh. It was later defused by bomb disposal personnel.
  - British security forces found and defused a horizontal mortar complete with warhead in Dungannon, County Tyrone.
- 12 May 1993: an IRA incendiary device partially detonated in the Cornmarket area of Oxford.
- 15 May 1993: an IRA sniper fired a single shot at an RUC patrol car in Maghera, County Londonderry.
- 16 May 1993: an IRA unit fired several shots at New Barnsley RUC base, Belfast.
- 19 May 1993: a lone IRA member lobbed a coffee jar bomb at a British Army foot patrol on Finaghy Road North, West Belfast.
- 20 May 1993: a 1,000 lb (450 kg) IRA bomb exploded in Glengall Street, Belfast, causing over 5 million pounds worth of damage.
- 22 May 1993:
  - a 1,000 lb (450 kg) IRA bomb devastated Portadown's town centre.
  - the IRA carried out a sniper and small arms attack on the British Army base of Killymeal, Dungannon, County Tyrone, and claimed a subsequent exchange of fire between IRA volunteers and British soldiers crewing an observation post. The RUC denied that soldiers returned fire.
  - an IRA unit fired several shots at New Barnsley RUC base, West Belfast.
- 23 May 1993:
  - a 200 lb (91 kg) IRA bomb wrecked a hotel in south Belfast.
  - an IRA bomb containing over 1,500 lb (680 kg) of explosives was detonated in the centre of Magherafelt, County Londonderry, causing millions of pounds worth of damage.
- 27 May 1993:
  - a British soldier was shot and wounded in an IRA attack while manning a checkpoint beside Belfast Central station.
  - an IRA unit tried to kill an alleged RIR soldier at his home in Ligoniel on the outskirts of Belfast, but their target escaped after a single shot missed.
- 28 May 1993:
  - a 600 lb (270 kg) IRA car bomb left outside the offices of the Laganside Corporation in Belfast city centre was neutralised by the British Army in a controlled explosion.
  - the IRA was responsible for over twenty-five hoax bombs in the Belfast area.
  - several IRA members entered a bar in the Ardoyne area of Belfast and search several patrons before taking one man away and shooting him in the legs. The crowd in the bar threw bottles and chairs at the IRA members in an attempt to intervene.
- 30 May 1993:
  - two IRA members boarded a train at Finaghy on the outskirts of Belfast, planted a bomb, and shouted a warning to passengers. Shortly after the train was evacuated the device exploded, extensively damaging a carriage.
  - IRA members opened fire from a hijacked vehicle at an RUC checkpoint on the Ormeau Road, Belfast.
- 31 May 1993:
  - a British soldier (Christopher Wren) was killed by an IRA booby trap bomb attached to his car while off duty in Moneymore, County Londonderry. The East Tyrone Brigade claimed responsibility.
  - an IRA unit fired on the home of an RUC officer in the Springvale Gardens area of Belfast. After failing to gain entry, the IRA members were fired upon by the officer.
- 3 June 1993: an IRA unit fired 30 rounds at soldiers manning an observation post at Woodbourne RUC station, Belfast.
- 4 June 1993: a 400 lb (180 kg) bomb left at the Killyhelvin Hotel in Enniskillen, County Fermanagh, was defused by the British Army in a controlled explosion. The device had been transported in a boat across the River Erne.
- 6 June 1993:
  - two RUC officers were injured after IRA members detonated a 120 lb (54 kg) bomb by command wire as a patrol vehicle passed on the Stewartstown Road, Belfast.
  - the IRA launched a mortar attack on the RUC base in Carrickmore, County Tyrone. The single round exploded within the barracks perimeter, resulting in some damage but no casualties. The Mark 15 mortar was fired from a Renault Trafic van.
- 7 June 1993: the IRA detonated a bomb at a gasworks in Tyneside, England.
- 9 June 1993: two small IRA bombs exploded at an Esso oil refinery in North Shields.
- 10 June 1993:
  - an IRA sniper fired a single shot at a workman removing scaffolding at Grosvenor Road RUC station, Belfast. The round narrowly missed, there was speculation the sniper had used a .50 BMG calibre rifle.
  - an IRA unit lobbed a coffee jar bomb at a British Army foot patrol in the Ballymurphy. The IRA claimed to have injured a soldier.
- 11 June 1993:
  - the IRA attempted to shoot down a Puma helicopter taking off from Crossmaglen British Army base, County Armagh. A barrack-buster mortar projectile, fired from the back of a local baker's delivery van, exploded on the helipad shortly after the pilot had managed to take off. Two escorting Lynx helicopters were unable to stop the attack, that was carried out to coincide with a one-day visit to Northern Ireland by Queen Elizabeth.
  - the IRA fired around twenty rounds at the British Army observation tower at Rosemount RUC base, Derry.
- 12 June 1993: an IRA sniper armed with a .50 BMG calibre "Tejas rifle" fired a single shot at a British soldier on a foot patrol in the Beechmount area of Belfast. The round struck his rifle and ricocheted striking his face.
- 15 June 1993:
  - an IRA unit fired up to fifty rounds at an RUC mobile patrol at Torrens Crescent in the Oldpark Road area of Belfast, striking an armoured vehicle.
  - IRA members detonated a hand grenade at a monument to King George IV in Dún Laoghaire, County Dublin. The attack was reportedly a tribute to a local IRA member, recently gaoled for life in the United Kingdom for bombing offenses, who had attempted to destroy the monument in an earlier bombing in 1970.
- 17 June 1993: the British Army carried out a controlled explosion on a suspect van that IRA members had abandoned beside a permanent vehicle checkpoint at Grosvenor Road RUC station, Belfast.
- 20 June 1993: the IRA shot and wounded a Protestant man in a gun attack at his home in Bootle Street in the Shankill area of Belfast. The IRA claimed he was a member of the Royal Irish Regiment.
- 21 June 1993: the IRA was responsible for hoax bombs in and around Belfast city centre, causing widespread disruption.
- 22 June 1993: the IRA detonated a 300 lb (140 kg) bomb at the Mourne Country Hotel in Newry, damaging at least 70 nearby homes. The IRA claimed they attacked the hotel because Secretary of State for Northern Ireland Patrick Mayhew visited a few days previously.
- 23 June 1993:
  - an IRA volunteer (Joseph Mulhern) was found shot by side of road, Ballymongan, near Castlederg, County Tyrone, as an alleged informer.
  - the IRA reported they fired a single shot at a member of British security forces shortly after he exited an armoured vehicle in Eliza Street in the Markets area of Belfast.
- 24 June 1993: a former UDR soldier (John Lyness) died after being shot several times at close range by the IRA outside his home, Lime Grove, Lurgan, County Armagh. He had seen his killers approaching and was armed with his personal protection weapon drawn but did not have time to use it. The shooting was claimed by the North Armagh Brigade.
- 26 June 1993:
  - a British soldier (John Randall) was shot dead by an IRA sniper near Newtownhamilton, County Armagh. He had been patrolling a field when the sniper fired a single high-velocity shot from the back of a stationary vehicle which hit Randall in the stomach.
  - an IRA unit fired 60 rounds at two armoured vehicles leaving Woodbourne RUC station, West Belfast.
  - the British Army defused a ready 500 lb (230 kg) bomb parked in Fintona, County Tyrone.
- 27 June 1993: the IRA detonated a 5 lb (2.3 kg) bomb on the Belfast-Dublin railway line adjacent to the Markets area of Belfast.
- 28 June 1993: an IRA unit ambushed an off-duty Royal Irish Regiment soldier as he drove along Portadown Road outside Stewartstown, County Tyrone, striking his car several times. The soldier returned fire and escaped uninjured. Other sources claim that the shooting took place at 8:00 pm on Moor road, beside Coalisland.

=== July–August ===
- 3 July 1993: a 100 lb (45 kg) IRA van bomb exploded outside Strabane courthouse, causing extensive damage.
- 5 July 1993:
  - a 1,500 lb (680 kg) bomb caused extensive damage in the centre of Newtownards, County Down. Nineteen people were injured.
  - two IRA bombs, 2,000 lb (910 kg) and 800 lb (360 kg), were discovered and defused by the British Army and one man was arrested at Whitecross, County Armagh. Security forces believed they were for a repeat of the Newtownards bombing in another town.
  - the IRA attempted to lure British security forces to a 500 lb (230 kg) van bomb in Queen Street, Belfast, with a hoax car bomb. The real device was detected and later defused by the British Army.
- 7 July 1993: a coffee jar bomb was lobbed at a joint British Army-RUC patrol in the New Lodge area of Belfast, but failed to explode.
- 8 July 1993:
  - a 500 lb (230 kg) IRA bomb in a hijacked car was defused by the British Army outside the Stormont hotel in East Belfast.
  - the IRA launched a 'barrack buster' mortar at the RUC base in Roslea, County Fermanagh. The IRA claims that the barracks were evacuated.
- 9 July 1993:
  - a 400 lb (180 kg) IRA car bomb outside British government offices in Adelaide Street in Belfast city centre was neutralised by the British Army in a controlled explosion. A hoax car bomb in the same street was also destroyed.
  - the British Army defused a suspect device in a hijacked taxi abandoned at Mountpottinger Road, East Belfast.
  - Fifty houses from a housing estate in Dungannon, County Tyrone, were evacuated after a mortar, that according to the IRA was a Mark 15 type, was fired at the town's RUC compound. The mortar bomb didn't explode on impact and was defused after three hours of work. The IRA statement also claims that the barracks had to be evacuated.
- 10 July 1993:
  - the IRA launched a horizontal mortar at an RUC armoured vehicle in the William Street area of Derry. The IRA reported the projectile glanced off.
  - a barn near Dungannon, County Tyrone, was hit by an IRA mortar bomb that appeared to have detonated prematurely. A suspected IRA volunteer was later arrested at Newtownstewart while heading towards the border. He was apparently injured in the mishap and admitted to a Belfast hospital under armed guard.
- 11 July 1993: an IRA unit lobbed two coffee jar bombs at a joint British Army-RUC mobile patrol on the Oldpark Road, North Belfast. There were no reported injuries.
- 13 July 1993:
  - the IRA claimed they fired shots to disperse a mob of Loyalists attacking Catholic homes in the Twinbrook area of West Belfast.
  - a horizontal mortar was fired at a joint British Army-RUC patrol from a parked car in William Street, Derry.
  - an IRA bomb attack was foiled when anti-terrorist police arrested an IRA member carrying a Semtex and petrol device at Staples Corner, Hendon, in north-west London.
- 14 July 1993: seventeen shots were fired just across the border from Aughrim, County Cavan, at a British Army permanent vehicle checkpoint at Gortmullan in County Fermanagh.
- 15 July 1993:
  - an IRA unit detonated a 250 lb (110 kg) car-bomb near the Markets area of Belfast after luring British security forces to the site. The explosion caused extensive damage to Belfast central station.
- 16 July 1993: an IRA bomb exploded at the front entrance of a bank in Strabane, County Tyrone.
- 17 July 1993: a British soldier (Kevin Pullin) was shot dead by a sniper while on foot patrol, Carran Road, Crossmaglen, County Armagh.
- 18 July 1993:
  - a 300 lb (140 kg) IRA car bomb was neutralised in the town of Banbridge, County Down, by a British Army disposal team which carried out a controlled explosion; 50 houses were evacuated for a lapse of five hours.
  - a shrapnel bomb containing 2.2 lb (1.00 kg) of Semtex was defused in the Markets area of Belfast.
- 19 July 1993: the IRA left several hoax car bombs across Belfast, causing significant disruption.
- 20 July 1993: an IRA unit fired several shots at a joint British Army-RUC checkpoint near the Short Strand area of Belfast. The IRA men had taken a family captive in their home to launch the attack.
- 22 July 1993: a Semtex booby-trap bomb attached to a car belonging to a member of British security forces was defused by the British Army in Rathcoole, County Antrim.
- 23 July 1993: the IRA claimed responsibility for a 100 lb (45 kg) bomb which exploded inside the Culmore checkpoint compound on the Derry-Moville road. The explosion blew out a section of the protective fence.
- 24 July 1993: a British soldier was injured after a coffee jar bomb was thrown at a combined British Army/RUC patrol in the New Lodge area of Belfast.
- 29 July 1993: the IRA tried to kill a man they claimed was a senior UDA member in Walmer Street, off the Ormeau Road, Belfast, but he wasn't home.
- 30 July 1993:
  - an IRA sniper fired on RUC officers in the Ardoyne area of Belfast, but there were no reported injuries.
  - a bomb attack was foiled when a British Army RIR patrol spotted a primed 20 lb (9.1 kg) device connected to a command wire in Pomeroy, County Tyrone. One man was arrested.
- 31 July 1993:
  - a British Army mobile checkpoint is fired at by an IRA sniper at Newtownhamilton, County Armagh. The British patrol manning the checkpoint returned fire.
  - a coffee jar bomb was thrown at a combined British Army/RUC patrol in the Shaw's Road area of West Belfast. There were no reported injuries. The IRA reported it was a horizontal mortar attack.
- 2 August 1993: the RUC found a 600 lb (270 kg) bomb during an arms search at a farm outside Cookstown, County Tyrone. It was believed to be intended for an IRA attack on the commercial centre of the town.
- 4 August 1993:
  - a remotely operated tractor carrying a 1,000 lb (450 kg) bomb careered off course driving towards a British Army checkpoint and was defused outside Belleeks, County Armagh. A straw-stuffed dummy had been placed in the driver's seat so as not to alert the soldiers manning the checkpoint.
  - a former member of the security forces escaped injury after a 2 lb (0.91 kg) Semtex bomb fell off his car on the Strabane Road, Castlederg, County Tyrone. The device was later defused by the British Army.
  - Gardaí foiled an IRA operation after intercepting three large primed bombs each 500 lb (230 kg) were found in a barn near Ballybofey Co. Donegal. Four people were arrested and a firearms recovered. The bombs were neutralised by the Irish Army.
- 6 August 1993: a 50 lb (23 kg) car bomb left in Alfred Street in Belfast city centre only partially exploded.
- 7 August 1993: a horizontal mortar launched at a joint British Army/RUC mobile patrol in the Lenadoon area of Belfast missed its target.
- 8 August 1993: British security forces believed they foiled a bomb attack after discovering a 200-meter long command wire in the Middletown area of South Armagh.
- 12 August 1993:
  - a 3,000 lb (1,400 kg) IRA van bomb was intercepted by British security forces in the Ballyoran area of Portadown. The driver escaped, the intended target was unclear.
  - a 4.4 lb (2.0 kg) Semtex bomb in a holdall in an alleyway off the Ormeau Road, Belfast, was defused by the British Army.
  - British security forces recovered a mortar launch tube from a building site in the Westrock area of West Belfast.
- 13 August 1993:
  - the IRA firebombed six premises in Bournemouth, England, and also detonated a bomb on the pier.
  - an IRA bomb exploded at the front entrance of a bank in Castle Street, Strabane, County Tyrone.
  - five RUC officers and four civilians were wounded when a 250 lb (110 kg) IRA car bomb exploded outside a restaurant in South Belfast.
- 14 August 1993: a 21 lb (9.5 kg) IRA bomb, targeting British security forces, exploded in Butcher Street Derry.
- 15 August 1993: a 6 lb (2.7 kg) IRA bomb targeting a new British government building on Franklin Street in Belfast city centre partially exploded.
- 18 August 1993: the IRA detonated a 150 lb (68 kg) car-bomb in Dublin Road, in the centre of Belfast city. The blast caused over 750,000 pounds worth of damage.
- 20 August 1993:
  - an IRA mortar attack on Newry's courthouse wounded ten people, among them a 10-year boy and two RUC officers. The courthouse had been closed since 1985, following a previous IRA attack.
  - a rocket propelled grenade fired by an IRA unit narrowly missed an RUC vehicle at Peter's Hill, Belfast. Three RUC officers were treated for shock afterwards.
- 22 August 1993: the IRA detonated a bomb on Gloucester Street, Belfast, causing considerable damage.
- 23 August 1993: the IRA detonated a car-bomb outside a bank on the Ormeau Road causing extensive damage.
- 25 August 1993: the IRA fired around thirty rounds at the British Army observation tower at Rosemount RUC base, Derry.
- 26 August 1993: the IRA carried out a rocket attack against a joint RUC-British Army convoy as it travelled along Lower Stanfield Street in the Markets area of Belfast.
- 27 August 1993:
  - the IRA mortared Lisnaskea RUC barracks in Fermanagh. Over 60 nearby homes were damaged in the attack. Several civilians and RUC officers were injured.
  - the IRA detonated a bomb on the Belfast-Dublin railway line in Belfast.
- 28 August 1993: British police defused an IRA bomb in London; the device was left within London's brand new high-tech security barrier dubbed the "Ring of Steel" built after the Bishopsgate bombing.
- 29 August 1993: gunshots were exchanged between the Provisional IRA and the Official IRA in the Markets area of Belfast.
- 31 August 1993:
  - the IRA detonated a 600 lb (270 kg) car-bomb at a shopping centre in Derriaghy, on the outskirts of Belfast, causing over 1 million pounds worth of damage and injuring two RUC officers. A second bomb detonated minutes later at a nearby cricket club.
  - two British soldiers and an RUC officer were treated for shock after only the detonator of a 4.5 lb (2.0 kg) Semtex bomb in a car exploded near their patrol in the Ardoyne area of Belfast.
  - a Semtex booby-trap bomb attached to an RUC Reserve officer's car in Armagh was defused.
  - a 600 lb (270 kg) car-bomb failed to fully detonate outside a hotel in Newtownabbey on the outskirts of Belfast.

=== September–October ===
- 1 September 1993: the British Army defused a 250 lb (110 kg) bomb buried in the ground near Cullyhanna, County Armagh. A second 500 lb (230 kg) bomb was found nearby in what the RUC called a "sophisticated" trap.
- 3 September 1993: a 1,000 lb (450 kg) IRA van-bomb detonated outside Armagh Courthouse causing widespread damage in the centre of Armagh City.
- 4 September 1993: the IRA began an undeclared suspension of operations for one week, timed to coincide with a visit to Ireland by an American delegation led by former Congressman Bruce Morrison. The group held a meeting with Sinn Féin.
- 10 September 1993:
  - Belfast's transport links were disrupted by a number of IRA hoax alerts. Hijacked vehicles containing hoax bombs were left outside various British security forces bases in the city.
  - an IRA unit fired several shots at two British armoured vehicles exiting Oldpark RUC station, North Belfast.
  - an IRA unit fired several shots at a fortified observation post at Woodbourne RUC station, West Belfast.
- 13 September 1993:
  - the IRA detonated a 300 lb (140 kg) car bomb at Stormont hotel in East Belfast, injuring an RUC officer and two civilians.
  - several shots were fired at Killyvilly vehicle checkpoint, County Fermanagh. British soldiers returned fire; hundreds of rounds were exchanged during the gun battle. There were no reported injuries. The IRA's South Fermanagh Brigade later denied responsibility, claiming the incident had been orchestrated by the British Army to coincide with a wake nearby to discredit the IRA.
- 14 September 1993:
  - the IRA detonated a bomb at the Fir Trees hotel in Strabane, County Tyrone, causing serious damage.
  - an IRA bomb exploded outside a bank in Belleek, County Fermanagh. A second 60 lb (27 kg) bomb was defused at the Carlton Hotel nearby.
  - An IRA "test site" was found by a British Army patrol in a remote area at the Sperrin Mountains, near Greencastle, County Tyrone.
- 15 September 1993:
  - the IRA shot dead a Catholic man (Adrian McGovern) outside his home, Stoneyford Road, Lisburn, County Antrim. He was a contractor to the BA/RUC. The IRA claimed he had been supplying the RUC with information on republicans.
  - the IRA attempted to kill an alleged senior UDA member at his home in Hazelfield Street in the Shankill area of Belfast. The IRA claimed a struggle ensued in which shots were fired after an armed Loyalist appeared at the door before a hostile crowd forced the unit to leave.
- 16 September 1993: three IRA incendiary devices were made safe in two separate cinemas in London.
- 18 September 1993:
  - the IRA claimed responsibility for hoax bomb alerts at the Stormont Hotel in East Belfast and at the Chimney Corner Hotel in County Antrim.
  - the IRA claimed to have orchestrated a bomb alert at the Culloden Hotel in Cultra, County Down, where British Secretary of State for Northern Ireland Patrick Mayhew was attending a function.
- 21 September 1993:
  - a British soldier was wounded when an IRA unit threw a blast-bomb at his patrol in the Ardoyne area of Belfast.
  - an IRA unit fired a rocket at a joint British Army-RUC patrol exiting an RUC base at Strand Road, Derry, but the projectile failed to explode.
- 23 September 1993: a fierce exchange of gunfire occurred between a number IRA armed trucks and British Army helicopters in south County Armagh, east of Crossmaglen. The IRA units used a large number of assault rifles and at least one heavy-machine gun. A Puma helicopter, ferrying the 3rd Infantry Brigade Commander, was hit. All the IRA volunteers managed to slip away in their vehicles, but a number of weapons were confiscated in the aftermath (see Battle of Newry Road).
- 24 September 1993: a soldier was wounded in a bomb attack on an RUC/BA mobile patrol in West Belfast. IRA sources claim that two British Army armoured vehicles were knocked down.
- 27 September 1993:
  - a 300 lb (140 kg) IRA car-bomb caused extensive damage in Gloucester Street in Belfast city centre.
  - a large IRA car-bomb wrecked commercial premises in Boucher Crescent in south Belfast. A female RUC officer was caught in the blast and suffered severe shock while attempting to evacuate a children's play centre. Around one hundred children were in the centre at the time of the explosion.
- 30 September 1993: a hotel in Markethill, County Armagh was badly damaged in an IRA bomb attack. Several homes were also damaged including one belonging to the MP for Newry and Armagh Seamus Mallon.
- 1 October 1993:
  - six IRA firebombs detonated in commercial premises in Belfast, Lisburn and Newtownabbey.
  - the IRA reported they lobbed a grenade at Strand Road RUC base, Derry. The RUC didn't verify the claim, although witnesses reported hearing a small bang.
- 2 October 1993:
  - three IRA bombs exploded in Hampstead, North London, injuring six people. The IRA stated that four devices exploded in three different locations.
  - an IRA unit fired 25 rounds at Oldpark RUC station in North Belfast, the IRA claimed they targeted a British Army technician working on a surveillance mast.
- 3 October 1993: a 200 lb (91 kg) IRA car bomb exploded outside a hotel in Newtownabbey, County Antrim. A nearby school was also damaged.
- 4 October 1993:
  - five IRA bombs detonated in North London, injuring four people and destroying a number of businesses.
  - the IRA bombed two businesses in North Belfast, on Duncrue Street and Oldpark Road.
  - the IRA bombed a pub on Botanic Avenue near Belfast city centre. The IRA claimed it was frequented by off-duty RUC officers.
  - an inert IRA bomb was discovered in a tavern in the New Lodge Road area of Belfast.
- 5 October 1993:
  - an IRA horizontal mortar bomb bounced off an RUC vehicle on Fanad Drive, Derry.
  - an IRA sniper fired a single shot at a British Army patrol near Crossmaglen, County Armagh.
- 8 October 1993:
  - an IRA unit fired over 200 rounds at the RUC barracks at Middletown, County Armagh; RUC members returned fire. A Presbyterian church, a primary school, and a convent were also hit, narrowly missing a civilian.
  - two IRA bombs exploded in North London.
- 9 October 1993: the IRA attacked a British Army base in Kilkeel, County Down, with a 12-tube Mk-15 multiple mortar, causing extensive damage to the barracks.
- 10 October 1993: the IRA reported that two British Army patrols became the target of anti-personnel explosive devices in Milltown, near Loughmacrory, County Tyrone.
- 12 October 1993:
  - IRA incendiary devices detonated in four commercial premises in Belfast and one in Lisburn.
  - a coffee jar type bomb was neutralised by the British Army in Etna Drive in the Ardoyne area of Belfast.
- 15 October 1993: two bombs inflicted some damage on the fortified courthouse at Cookstown, County Tyrone, in an attack also aimed at the adjoining British Army checkpoint. Fifty families were evacuated to a nearby church hall. IRA sources claimed that there were RUC and British Army casualties, but the RUC denied this.
- 17 October 1993:
  - a man was shot and seriously injured at his home in South Belfast. The IRA's original target was Joe Bratty, a senior member of the UDA/UFF, whose car was parked outside.
  - a British soldier sustained an ear blast injury when a firework bomb was thrown at a British Army foot patrol in Dungannon, County Tyrone.
- 18 October 1993:
  - British security forces disarmed a large bomb buried in a quarry near Cappagh, County Tyrone. A command wire led to an ignition pack nearby. Security forces believed the IRA's target was an RUC or British Army patrol present to supervise blasting at the site.
  - the IRA carried out a bomb attack against the RUC barracks in Castlederg, County Tyrone. A restaurant was damaged and a civilian (Annie Bogle, 73) died from a heart attack.
  - an incendiary device was discovered in a furniture shop in Newtownabbey and later neutralised by the British Army.
- 19 October 1993:
  - a British soldier was wounded by a blast bomb in Belfast, while patrolling Ardoyne's Edna Drive.
  - a 0.75 lb (0.34 kg) booby-trap bomb attached to the underside of an RIR soldier's car was spotted and later defused in Maghera, County Londonderry.
- 20 October 1993:
  - the IRA carried out a horizontal mortar attack against an RUC mobile patrol near Fort George in Derry. The launcher was welded to the roof of a vehicle. According to the IRA, the weapon was a normally shoulder-held device and detonated by an IRA member inside the vehicle, who then drove off.
  - an IRA unit lobbed a coffee jar bomb attack at British security forces mobile patrol in Horn Drive in the Lenadoon area of Belfast.
- 21 October 1993: the manager of a security firm with contracts to the British Army was shot dead by the IRA at his home in Glengormley, County Antrim.
- 22 October 1993: an IRA unit lobbed a coffee jar bomb at RUC officers in the Falcarragh Drive in the Lenadoon area of Belfast.
- 23 October 1993: Shankill Road bombing: eight civilians, one UDA member and one IRA volunteer (Thomas Begley) were killed when an IRA bomb prematurely exploded at a fish shop on Shankill Road, Belfast. The IRA's intended target was a meeting of loyalist paramilitary leaders, which was scheduled to take place in a room above the shop. However, unbeknownst to the IRA, the meeting had been rescheduled.
- 24 October 1993: an IRA bomb exploded on a railway line in Berkshire, England. Other devices were defused at Reading and Basingstoke stations. A fourth device detonated near Brill in Buckinghamshire.
- 25 October 1993: an IRA unit carried out a gun attack on a British checkpoint in Derriaghy on the outskirts of Belfast.
- 28 October 1993: a fire broke out at bookshop in Belfast city centre. The RUC believed an incendiary device was the cause.
- 29 October 1993: a small IRA bomb exploded in Edwards Square, London.
- 30 October 1993: the IRA exploded several incendiary bombs in a British government office in Arthur Street in Belfast city centre.

=== November–December ===
- 1 November 1993: British Army experts defused a 145 lb (66 kg) roadside bomb intended for a security forces patrol at Tullyara Road in Pomeroy, County Tyrone.
- 2 November 1993: an RUC officer (Brian Woods) died two days after being shot by an IRA sniper while at an RUC Vehicle Check Point (VCP), Upper Edward Street, Newry, County Down. A single shot hit him in the neck.
- 3 November 1993: a coffee-jar bomb was thrown at an RUC patrol in Bryson Street in the Short Strand area of Belfast. The IRA claimed they injured four RUC officers.
- 4 November 1993: an anti-personnel bomb targeting British security forces was defused in a coal yard on Stewartstown Road, Belfast.
- 7 November 1993:
  - an IRA unit fired on a joint British Army/RUC checkpoint on the Grosvenor Road, Belfast.
  - a British soldier was shot and wounded by an IRA sniper while on a foot patrol in Spamount street, New Lodge Road, Belfast.
  - an IRA unit attacked with machine-gun fire and a barrack-buster mortar an RUC base in Caledon, County Tyrone. A nearby church and several houses were also damaged, and more than 50 people were evacuated.
- 9 November 1993:
  - a 500 lb (230 kg) van bomb was defused in Essex Street in the Ormeau Road area of Belfast.
  - an IRA bomb with up to 200–250 lb (91–113 kg) of home-made explosives in a wheelie bin was defused at Drum Road, Cookstown.
- 10 November 1993: a 2 lb (0.91 kg) Semtex jar bomb thrown at a British security forces patrol in the Stewartstown Road area of West Belfast failed to explode and was later defused.
- 11 November 1993: a Semtex under-car booby-trap bomb attached to a van was neutralised by the British Army in Bleach Green Avenue, Newtownabbey, County Antrim.
- 12 November 1993: for the second time in less than a year, a manure spreader, converted into an improvised flamethrower and pulled by a tractor, doused Borucki sangar in Crossmaglen with 1,100 imperial gallons (5,000 L) of petrol. A small explosive device ignited the fuel stream and a nine meters-high fireball engulfed the tower. Four Grenadier Guards inside were rescued by a Saxon armored vehicle.
- 16 November 1993: a soldier was wounded by an IRA bomb in the Turf Lodge area of Belfast.
- 21 November 1993: an IRA unit attacked with gunfire the house of a former UDR soldier in Cookstown, County Tyrone; no one was injured. The IRA claimed the former soldier was a member of the UVF.
- 23 November 1993: a Semtex undercar booby-trap bomb failed to explode after falling off a car in Portadown, County Armagh; a magnet on the device had fixed itself to a manhole in the middle of a busy road.
- 24 November 1993: a British soldier was injured after a coffee jar bomb was thrown at a joint British Army-RUC patrol in the New Lodge area of Belfast.
- 27 November 1993:
  - a bomb containing 50 lb (23 kg) of home-made explosives planted at Poleglass Roundabout in West Belfast was defused by the British Army following an IRA warning that they had aborted an operation.
  - a blast bomb was thrown at a British Army patrol in the New Lodge area of Belfast.
- 29 November 1993:
  - the IRA fired several shots at the home of an RUC officer in the Portadown Road area of Armagh town. The attack was intended to lure security forces into range of a 2,000 lb (910 kg) bomb hidden in a trailer, but the IRA claimed they aborted the operation because of the presence of civilians as the mobile patrol passed.
  - a car with a mounted Mark-16 horizontal mortar was found by security forces parked close to a school in Cookstown, County Tyrone. The RUC suspected it was an IRA attempt to ambush an RUC/British Army patrol. The primed mortar was defused by British Army technicians, who had to carry out six controlled explosions on the vehicle before declaring the device safe.
  - an IRA unit fired several shots at a joint British Army/RUC foot patrol on the Springfield Road, Belfast.
  - an IRA unit lobbed a coffee jar bomb at a British Army foot patrol in the Brompton Park area of Ardoyne, North Belfast.
- December 1993: the IRA fired two rounds from a Barret .50 calibre rifle at Bird-class patrol vessel HMS Cygnet at Carlingford Lough.
- 1 December 1993:
  - an RUC officer and a civilian were injured when a bomb exploded as a joint British Army-RUC patrol passed at the junction of the Antrim Road and Duncairn Avenue in the New Lodge area of Belfast.
  - an IRA unit opened fire on Oldpark RUC base in North Belfast.
  - an IRA unit opened fire on a security forces base in the Whiterock area of West Belfast.
  - an IRA unit opened fire on Broadway Tower base in West Belfast.
  - an IRA unit opened fire on a British Army RIR sangar at the Belfast Law Courts adjacent to the Markets area.
  - several shots were fired at a British Army patrol in Clogh Forest near Rosslea, County Fermanagh. The soldiers returned fire. There were no reported injuries.
- 2 December 1993:
  - a British soldier (Paul Garrett) was shot dead by a sniper while on foot-patrol, Victoria Street, Keady, County Armagh. He was hit in the stomach by a single bullet fired from a nearby hill.
  - a 1,100 lb (500 kg) bomb, targeting an RUC mobile patrol, was defused by the IRA after the remote detonator failed in the Poleglass area of Belfast. Nearly eight hundred pupils from a nearby primary school were evacuated.
  - an IRA unit lobbed a coffee jar bomb at British security forces foot patrol emerging from Henry Taggart base on the Springfield Road.
- 3 December 1993: the IRA detonated a 15 lb (6.8 kg) bomb after luring three RUC officers to a vacant house in the Loyalist Glenbryn Park area of North Belfast.
- 7 December 1993: an IRA unit mortared Newtownbutler RUC barracks in Fermanagh.
- 12 December 1993:
  - two RUC officers (Constables Andrew Beacom and Ernest Smith) were shot dead by the IRA East Tyrone Brigade while traveling in their civilian-type patrol car in Fivemiletown, County Tyrone. The patrol car was on Main Street when it was hit by at least 20 shots from both sides of the road. In a follow-up operation a British Army Lynx helicopter received automatic fire from an IRA unit. (See 1993 Fivemiletown ambush)
  - an IRA unit opened fire on a retired RUC officer and his wife as they drove home from Fortwilliam Golf Club in North Belfast. They were only slightly injured.
- 13 December 1993: a 90 lb (41 kg) anti-personnel device was found by British security forces on Glen Road in the Andersonstown area of West Belfast.
- 14 December 1993:
  - an IRA bomb exploded on a railway track in Woking, Surrey, England, disrupting commuter services.
  - two soldiers were wounded by a trip wire bomb blast at a railway near Ebrington Barracks in Derry.
  - an IRA attack was foiled after British security forces uncovered a 1,100 lb (500 kg) bomb in the Markets area of Belfast. The IRA said the bomb was intended for a "specific target" nearby.
- 16 December 1993: two further IRA bombs on the Surrey railway were defused.
- 19 December 1993:
  - an IRA landmine attack on a British mobile patrol at Buncrana Road, Derry using a 500 lb (230 kg) bomb left four civilians in a passing car - one adult and three young children - in need of hospital treatment. A suspect was arrested at his home eight hours later, where traces of Semtex were found. Damages were estimated at £450,000.
  - a small IRA bomb went off at a derelict farm near Cookstown, County Tyrone. The explosion was designed to appear accidental to lure British security forces into the vicinity of a larger 160 lb (73 kg) bomb, which failed to detonate.
- 20 December 1993:
  - a British soldier and a civilian were wounded in an IRA remote-detonation bomb attack on a mobile patrol in the Suffolk area of Belfast.
  - a number of IRA firebombs exploded in stores and a post-office in London causing minor damage. Seven incendiary devices were made safe.
- 23 December 1993: the IRA announced a three-day Christmas ceasefire.
- 27 December 1993:
  - the IRA launched a mortar attack on an RUC base in Fintona, County Tyrone. Two civilian passers-by were wounded. It was the first of a number of attacks marking the end of the Christmas ceasefire. Damage was estimated at £125,000.
  - the IRA carried out a coffee jar attack on Springfield Road RUC base in Belfast. Five people were hospitalised and several nearby homes were damaged.
  - the IRA launched a gun and bomb attack on a British Army base in Portadown, County Armagh.
- 28 December 1993: a British soldier was injured when the IRA fired a horizontal mortar at a foot-patrol in Belfast.
- 29 December 1993:
  - a mortar was defused by the British Army on the Falls Road near Whiterock Road junction.
  - the IRA carried out a horizontal mortar attack in the Poleglass area of Belfast. No reported injuries.
  - an IRA unit fired a missile at a British patrol on Upper Library Street in Belfast. A soldier received shrapnel wounds. The IRA claimed that this was a new armour-piercing mortar projectile.
- 30 December 1993:
  - a British soldier (Daniel Blinco) was shot dead by an IRA sniper while on foot-patrol in Crossmaglen, County Armagh.
  - an IRA unit carried out a gun and rocket attack on a British Army mobile patrol in the Ardoyne area of Belfast. The IRA unit launched the attack from the garden of a house owned by a couple they took hostage. One soldier was slightly wounded.
  - Members of a joint British Army/RUC patrol escaped injury when an IRA landmine exploded in the environs of West Belfast.

== 1994 ==
=== January–February ===
- 1 January 1994:
  - almost a dozen premises in and around Belfast were firebombed by the IRA including the Linen Hall Library, causing £1,000,000 worth of damage.
  - the IRA forced a man to carry a bomb in his car to the British Army RIR base in Cookstown, County Tyrone. The device was declared a hoax after being neutralised by the British Army in controlled explosions. Also, a taxi driver was forced to carry a hoax bomb to the RIR base in Dungannon, County Tyrone, but was stopped by a British patrol. Up to 100 families were evacuated from their homes.
- 3 January 1994: an IRA unit fired several shots at a civilian as they drove out of Rockwood British Army base in Castlederg, County Tyrone. The driver narrowly escaped injury but was treated for shock. The IRA's West Tyrone brigade claimed they fired 68 shots at a car driven by undercover British soldiers.
- 6 January 1994:
  - an IRA unit fired two rockets at a British Army armoured mobile patrol on the Springfield Road Belfast.
- 7 January 1994:
  - an IRA unit lobbed a coffee jar bomb at a joint RUC-British Army patrol in the New Lodge Road area of North Belfast.
  - an IRA unit launched a horizontal mortar attack against an RUC-British Army patrol in the Andersonstown area of Belfast. The IRA claimed they scored a direct hit, wrecking an RUC vehicle.
- 10 January 1994:
  - two British soldiers were seriously injured by an IRA booby-trap inside their base in Crossmaglen, County Armagh, following a mortar attack on the barracks. The bomb was hidden in the launcher vehicle, which had been recovered by explosives technicians.
- 11 January 1994:
  - three RUC officers were injured when their patrol vehicle was hit by an IRA rocket in the Short Strand area of Belfast.
  - a 500 lb (230 kg) IRA bomb was defused by the British Army on Malvern Avenue in Derry.
  - the RUC foiled an IRA attack after locating a coffee jar bomb in an apartment building in the New Lodge area of Belfast. The device was neutralised by the British Army.
- 12 January 1994:
  - a female British soldier was shot twice and seriously wounded by an IRA sniper in the New Lodge area of Belfast. Troops returned fire. An RUC officer and a number of civilians suffered minor injuries when a bomb aimed at a British Army patrol demolished a nearby building 50 minutes later. A loaded rifle was recovered and two men arrested in the aftermath.
  - a coffee jar bomb was thrown at an RUC vehicle at a security barrier in Lurgan but failed to explode.
- 15 January 1994: the IRA exploded a total of eleven incendiary devices in commercial premises in Belfast, Newtownards, Finaghy, and Newry.
- 16 January 1994: seven men were arrested after an IRA barrack buster mortar was positioned in firing range of a permanent vehicle checkpoint near Clogher, County Tyrone.
- 19 January 1994: three stores in Coleraine and Limavady were damaged by IRA firebombs. Devices were also found in four other premises.
- 20 January 1994:
  - the IRA claimed responsibility for a coffee jar bomb attack on British security forces closing a security barrier on the Donegall Road, Belfast.
  - British security forces disrupted a planned ambush when they found a command wire leading from a culvert to a firing device at Cappagh, County Tyrone.
- 22 January 1994:
  - a British Army Land Rover was hit by an IRA horizontal mortar while on patrol in Poleglass, West Belfast.
  - the IRA shot and wounded a man in the Hatfield Bar on the Ormeau Road, Belfast; they claimed he was involved in numerous acts of criminality.
- 23 January 1994:
  - two civilians were injured when an IRA bomb intended for security forces exploded in a farmhouse at Cabragh, near Dungannon, County Tyrone.
  - an IRA incendiary device severely damaged a fabric shop in the Lisnagelvin area of Derry.
  - an IRA incendiary device triggered water sprinklers in a furniture shop in Strabane, County Tyrone, causing extensive damage.
- 24 January 1994:
  - incendiary bombs were found in a hardware store in Derry.
  - an RUC officer returned fire and escaped injury after an IRA unit opened fire at him in Lisnaskea, County Fermanagh.
  - an IRA unit opened fired on construction workers at the Belfast Law Courts. Afterwards a bomb exploded nearby in a hijacked taxi but British security forces escaped injury.
  - a horizontal mortar was defused in Enniskillen, County Fermanagh.
- 27 January 1994:
  - an IRA member was hospitalised after a horizontal mortar he was preparing exploded in Derry.
  - IRA bombs exploded in three stores in Oxford Street, London.
- 28 January 1994:
  - a British army patrol escaped injury when only the detonator on an IRA bomb exploded in the Stewartstown area of West Belfast.
  - an IRA firebomb exploded in Oxford Street, London, and another was discovered.
- 29 January 1994: two IRA firebombs were found in stores in Oxford Street, London.
- 30 January 1994: the IRA fired a rocket at a British Army post atop an apartment block in the New Lodge area of Belfast. The IRA claimed it was the 25th time they had attacked the position.
- 1 February 1994:
  - the IRA launched a mortar attack on a British Army border post in Cloghoge, County Armagh.
  - an IRA attack was foiled after British security forces found a rocket launcher with a primed warhead in Springhill Park, Strabane, County Tyrone.
- 3 February 1994:
  - the IRA carried out a rocket attack against an armoured RUC patrol vehicle on the Woodvale Road in North Belfast.
  - an IRA unit planted a bomb outside the home of the RUC assistant Chief Constable in Derry.
- 5 February 1994:
  - an IRA unit opened fire on British security forces carrying out repairs at Oldpark RUC base, North Belfast.
  - IRA firebombs severely damaged a wholesaler on the Boucher Road, Belfast. Devices also exploded in a supermarket and pub. Further firebomb finds were made in a commercial premises on the Donegall Road.
- 6 February 1994: three British soldiers were seriously injured, one "severely" when an IRA horizontal mortar hit their patrol vehicle in Poleglass, West Belfast.
- 10 February 1994:
  - undercover RUC officers intercepted an IRA unit armed with assault rifles and a coffee jar bomb in the Belmont area of Belfast; the RUC, based on an intelligence tip-off, believed their intended target was a RUC detective Chief Superintendent who lived nearby. The same officer had been seriously injured in a previous IRA assassination attempt in November 1983.
  - the British Army defused an improvised IRA grenade in Market Square, Lurgan, County Armagh, primed and ready for an attack.
- 11 February 1994:
  - an IRA car bomb exploded beside a British Army foot patrol in Crossmaglen. No injuries were reported. Only individual equipment was damaged by shrapnel.
  - a Mark-16 mortar attack on Antrim Road RUC station, Belfast, was foiled after British soldiers and RUC officers raided a house on the Cavehill Road overlooking the base. Three men and one woman were arrested.
- 12 February 1994: a coffee jar bomb was thrown at British troops by an IRA unit in Cookstown, County Tyrone, but the device failed to explode.
- 13 February 1994:
  - the IRA fired several shots at the British Army observation tower at Rosemount RUC base, Derry.
  - an incendiary device exploded in a restaurant in High Street Belfast. Further devices exploded in a furniture and carpet store on North Street.
- 16 February 1994: four British soldiers were wounded by an IRA roadside bomb, one seriously, while on patrol at Short Strand, east Belfast. An RUC officer was also injured.
- 17 February 1994:
  - an RUC officer (William Beacom) was killed and two others seriously injured when the IRA fired a homemade rocket at an RUC patrol vehicle on Friendly Street in the Market Quarter, South Belfast.
  - an IRA bomb detonated prematurely in the Turf Lodge area of Belfast.
- 18 February 1994: an IRA incendiary device was defused in a shop at Charing Cross, London.
- 19 February 1994: a number of incendiary devices were left in shops in London, including Burton stores in Regent Street and New Oxford Street. One device destroyed a newsagents shop, three caused minor damage, and several others were made safe.
- 20 February 1994:
  - the IRA attacked eleven commercial premises in Belfast with firebombs, including several supermarkets and an electrical store.
  - an IRA unit fired a rocket at a British Army patrol vehicle in Poleglass, West Belfast. The soldiers inside were treated for shock and ear injuries.
- 21 February 1994:
  - an IRA mortar attack destroyed an RUC base and caused widespread damage in Beragh, County Tyrone.
  - an IRA attack was foiled after RUC officers spotted a command wire in Etna Drive, Ardoyne. Three men were arrested and the British Army defused the attached bomb.
- 25 February 1994:
  - a motorcycle dealership on the Boucher Road, Belfast was destroyed in an IRA incendiary bomb attack.
  - the IRA planted several incendiary devices in commercial premises in Derry; a timber yard was gutted but firemen prevented the flames spreading to a nearby oil storage depot. Two pubs in the city were also damaged.
  - three men were arrested and a mortar neutralised by experts after a British patrol noticed suspicious activity at a house in the St. James's Road area of Belfast.

=== March–April ===
- 1 March 1994: a car with 300 kg (660 lb) of explosives inside was intercepted by British security forces at a checkpoint near Pomeroy, County Tyrone. A further 1,000 kg (2,200 lb) of explosives were also found in a derelict house nearby.
- 3 March 1994:
  - the IRA carried out a horizontal mortar attack on a British Army mobile patrol at the Monagh Bypass west Belfast.
  - the British Army defused a small Semtex bomb placed beside Rosemount RUC station in Derry. Fifty homes were evacuated for the duration of the operation.
- 5 March 1994: Irish security forces foiled a barrack buster mortar attack on a British Army checkpoint at Clady, County Tyrone. The mortar, mounted to a 4x4 vehicle, was found near Castlefin, County Donegal and destroyed in a controlled explosion.
- 8 March 1994: four Mark-6 mortar shells were fired from a car towards Heathrow Airport near London. The shells landed on or near the northern runway, but failed to explode.
- 10 March 1994:
  - the IRA launched a second attack on Heathrow Airport, firing four mortar shells over the perimeter fence which landed near Terminal Four but failed to explode.
  - an off-duty RUC officer (John Haggan) was shot dead by the IRA at the Dunmore Greyhound Stadium, off Antrim Road, Belfast. The officer was in the lounge when he was shot in the head by an IRA volunteer and shot again as he lay on the ground. A second IRA volunteer fired into the ceiling to cover their escape.
  - the IRA fired a horizontal mortar at a British Army vehicle on Culmore Road, Derry. The projectile scored a hit, but there were no reported injuries.
  - incendiary devices were found in a shop in Ann Street and a shop in Donegall Arcade in Belfast city centre. No damage was caused.
- 11 March 1994: an IRA unit drove into Belleek, County Fermanagh to launch a machinegun attack from a hijacked van up-armoured with sandbags and steel plating but returned across the border after failing to encounter a British Army patrol.
- 13 March 1994:
  - the IRA defied tightened security to launch a third attack on Heathrow Airport, firing five mortar shells over the perimeter fence which landed near Terminal Four but failed to explode. Later that night both Heathrow and Gatwick airports were closed for two hours after coded telephoned bomb threats were received.
  - an IRA arms cache was discovered at a college in Belfast. A grenade, a rifle, a pistol, a homemade bomb, a number of detonators, 2 lb of explosive and over 1,500 rounds of ammunition were captured.
  - in a statement demanding direct talks with the British government, the IRA also claimed despite having advance knowledge they had decided not to assassinate a member of the British Royal Family, Princess Anne, while she was visiting a BAFTA awards ceremony at Belfast Grand Opera House the previous night. The IRA said they wanted to avert a surge in sectarian violence.
- 15 March 1994: train services were disrupted after a small Semtex bomb was found on a railway line near Sevenoaks railway station in Kent, England. Police believed the IRA had planted the device in December 1993.
- 19 March 1994: a shell from a Mark-15 mortar hit a British Army Lynx helicopter attempting to land at a base in Crossmaglen. an RUC officer was pulled out of the blazing helicopter before it exploded.
- 21 March 1994:
  - an IRA unit launched a shoulder-fired mortar at a joint British Army-RUC patrol in North Belfast. The projectile exploded but missed its target.
  - a Mark-15 barrack buster mortar vehicle was discovered at Ballyrath Road outside Armagh city and defused by the British Army.
- 22 March 1994:
  - an IRA member lobbed an improvised grenade at British soldiers as they exited Springfield Road RUC base, Belfast.
  - Orpington railway station on the outskirts of London was closed after a worker found part of an IRA incendiary device timer on a track. Police believed the device was planted three months earlier.
- 23 March 1994:
  - a primed horizontal mortar launcher was defused in the front garden of a home in the Shaw's Road area of West Belfast. Armed IRA members had taken the occupants hostage.
  - the IRA claimed responsibility for an incendiary bomb attack which destroyed a furniture warehouse in East Belfast.
  - a Mark-15 barrack buster mortar mounted in a white Renault van was neutralised by the British Army. The vehicle had been hijacked near Swatragh, County Londonderry, on 14 March.
- 24 March 1994: the IRA carried out a mortar attack on Newtownbutler RUC station, County Fermanagh. The device failed to explode and there were no reported injuries. The device was one of the most powerful IRA mortars yet recovered; containing 260 kg (570 lb) of explosives, 100 kg (220 lb) more than a typical barrack buster.
- 31 March 1994:
  - Portadown RUC base came under attack from an IRA unit using rockets and automatic weapons. An RUC officer manning the front guard post was injured.
  - an RPG-7 rocket and several shots were fired at an RUC base in Garvagh, County Londonderry. One RUC officer was treated for shock and minor injuries.
- 1 April 1994:
  - the IRA planted a 200 kg (440 lb) anti-personnel bomb on Nursery Road in Armagh city. The explosives were neutralised by the British Army.
  - an IRA mortar attack on Roslea RUC station, County Fermanagh, failed.
- 2 April 1994: loud explosions were heard near Crossmaglen, County Armagh. A follow-up operation by British security forces failed to trace the source of the explosions; allegedly the IRA were testing an iteration of their Mark 15 barrack-buster mortar.
- 3 April 1994: Two IRA masked militants made a public statement at a hall in Carrickmore, County Tyrone, where an Easter Sunday concert was being performed. The declaration said that "the Republican movement had never been stronger, more united and confident".
- 5 April 1994: the IRA began a three-day ceasefire in an attempt to show it was serious about bringing about an end to the conflict.
- 8 April 1994: the three-day IRA ceasefire ended at midnight.
- 9 April 1994:
  - an IRA unit attacked two checkpoints (Clonnaty Bridge and Kilturk) near Newtownbutler, Fermanagh with automatic weapons. One of the attacks on an outpost manned by the British Army lasted five minutes.
  - an IRA unit fired an improvised rocket at a British patrol in Stewartstown road, Belfast.
  - a coffee jar bomb was thrown over the perimeter fence of Oldpark RUC station, North Belfast. One RUC officer was treated for shock.
  - a permanent border checkpoint at Aughnacloy, County Tyrone, became the target of an improvised mortar fired by an IRA unit at midday. An IRA East Tyrone Brigade statement reports that the militants took over and blocked the road between the checkpoint and the border, then issued a 30-minute warning before the attack. The mortar was transported and fired by a tractor. The barrack-buster projectile, described as a "very large" device, overshot the installation and landed in an adjacent housing estate, forcing its evacuation. DUP Derry councillor Alderman Campbell was incidentally passing the checkpoint en route to a peace conference at Wiclow at the time of the attack. According to some sources, the device exploded but caused little damage.
- 10 April 1994: an IRA incendiary bomb badly damaged a furniture store in Strabane, County Tyrone.
- 12 April 1994: an IRA bomb detonated in the garden of a house as a joint British Army-RUC patrol passed in the Ardoyne area of Belfast. Eight people had to be treated for shock.
- 13 April 1994: the IRA carried out a 'Barrack Buster' mortar attack on Newry RUC station. The projectile failed to detonate on impact.
- 15 April 1994: an RUC patrol came under IRA rocket attack in Armagh town. The warhead glanced off the windscreen and exploded nearby. The officers inside and two bystanders were treated for shock.
- 17 April 1994:
  - an IRA remote-detonation bomb attack targeting RUC officers was aborted near Stewartstown, County Tyrone. The IRA claimed the presence of civilians forced them to defuse and remove the device. A bogus car bomb had been left earlier outside Stewartstown RUC station.
  - an IRA booby trap bomb failed to detonate at the home of a British soldier in Carmoney on the northern outskirts of Belfast. A British Army response team had been lured to the site by a hoax car bomb parked outside.
- 20 April 1994:
  - an RUC officer (Gregory Pollock) was killed when the IRA fired a horizontal mortar at a British Army patrol in the Waterside area of Derry City. Several other RUC officers were injured.
  - the IRA shot and injured Bobby Dougan, a leading member of the UDA, outside his home in the Suffolk area of Belfast. He had previously escaped an INLA assassination attempt in October 1993 and the IRA finally succeeded in killing him in February 1998.
- 21 April 1994: an IRA member was shot and wounded by the RUC in a car chase in South Armagh. He was arrested afterwards for trying to purchase detonators in Arizona, USA.
- 23 April 1994:
  - the IRA launched a horizontal mortar at an RUC patrol vehicle in the Stewartstown Road area of Belfast but missed. There were no reported injuries.
  - the IRA attempted to kill an alleged British Army RIR soldier at his home in the Woodvale area of Belfast.
- 24 April 1994: the IRA shot dead two men (John McCloy and Alan Smith) as they sat in a stationary car, at Main Street, Garvagh, County Londonderry. The IRA alleged that Smith was a senior member of the Ulster Defence Association (UDA) involved in several attacks but this was denied by family and friends. Alan Smith was a former member of the UDR and had survived two previous IRA assassination attempts. However, in January 2022 a report released by the Police Ombudsman for Northern Ireland named Alan Smith as being linked by the RUC to several murders committed by loyalist paramilitaries.
- 25 April 1994:
  - a British soldier was injured when a mortar hit Crossmaglen British Army base, County Armagh.
  - the RUC security base at Pomeroy, County Tyrone, became the target of automatic rifle fire from a ten-militant IRA unit, according to an IRA statement.
  - Sixteen alleged drug-dealers were kneecapped by the IRA across Belfast.
- 26 April 1994: an alleged drug dealer (Francis Rice) was shot five times in the head and his body dumped on a grass verge beside Half Moon Lake, off Suffolk Road, Belfast. Earlier in the day a three-man IRA unit burst into his home and he had escaped by jumping out a first story window.
- 28 April 1994: a former UDR soldier (Eric Smyth) was shot dead by the IRA outside his home, Salters Grange Road, near Armagh town.
- 29 April 1994: Michael Brown, a native of County Leitrim, was found shot dead by the IRA by the side of Omeath Road, near Newry, County Down. He was killed as an alleged informer.

=== May–June ===
- 1 May 1994: two alleged drug dealers were kneecapped by the IRA.
- 2 May 1994: the IRA claims that one of its units launched a rocket at an observation post at the Belfast High Court security cordon.
- 6 May 1994: an IRA unit fired an RPG-7 rocket at a British Army patrol in the Lenadoon area of Belfast. A woman who was standing nearby was wounded by shrapnel.
- 9 May 1994: an IRA unit armed with both heavy and light machine guns carried out a sustained attack on a British Army border checkpoint at Kilturk, near Newtownbutler, County Fermanagh.
- 11 May 1994: an IRA unit fired several shots at a British observation post at Townhall Street in Belfast city centre.
- 12 May 1994:
  - the homes of two RUC officers were bombed by the IRA in the Waterside area of Derry. The second bomb was defused.
  - an IRA unit launched a mortar at an RUC base in Newry.
  - an IRA unit fired a rocket at a British patrol in Poleglass, West Belfast.
- 13 May 1994: Fred Anthony, a civilian employed by the RUC, was killed by the IRA after a booby trap bomb exploded beneath his car as he drove along Hill Street, Lurgan, County Armagh. His three-year-old daughter was seriously injured.
- 14 May 1994: a British soldier (David Wilson) was killed when the IRA detonated a bomb next to a British Army permanent vehicle checkpoint at Castleblaney Road, Keady, County Armagh. Another soldier was injured.
- 18 May 1994: an IRA caller warned that a booby-trap bomb placed under a car had failed to explode; no details were given but it was believed by security forces to belong to an RUC officer in the Castlederg, County Tyrone, area.
- 20 May 1994: an IRA unit fired on a British Army observation post atop Broadway Tower in the Iveagh area of West Belfast.
- 21 May 1994:
  - a Royal Irish Regiment (RIR) soldier from Cookstown, County Tyrone, was kidnapped by the IRA and later found shot dead in a field near Mullaghcreevie housing estate in Armagh town. His brother Nigel (a British Army employee) had been killed the previous year during an IRA mortar attack on a military base in Keady, County Armagh, and their grandmother (Lilly McCollum) died in 1983 in an attack on her brother, a member of the UDR.
  - an IRA volunteer (Martin Doherty) manning the doors of The Widow Scallan's pub in Dublin was shot dead while the UVF attempted a bomb and gun attack on IRA and Sinn Féin republicans gathered inside at an event.
  - an IRA rocket missed an RUC Land Rover on a mobile patrol in Guildhall, Derry. Several windows were shattered in the surrounding area.
- 23 May 1994:
  - the IRA shot dead a security guard (Nigel Thomas Smith) in central Belfast. The man had been training with the British Army but had been discharged on medical grounds.
  - the IRA used a motor boat stolen from Foyle Search and Rescue Service to cross Lough Foyle and plant an explosive device at the jetty of Fort George British Army base in Derry. Two soldiers were wounded, and one of them was permanently blinded by the blast.
  - the IRA left a 30 lb (14 kg) bomb at a boat club near Lisnaskea, County Fermanagh.
  - the IRA fired a rocket at Tennent Street RUC station, Belfast.
  - an IRA unit abandoned a primed Mark 15 barrack buster mortar launcher between Moy and Benburb, County Tyrone, because of intense security forces activity.
- 25 May 1994: the British Army defused two coffee jar bombs in the Upper Stanfield area of the Markets, Belfast.
- 26 May 1994: a 400 lb (180 kg) bomb was defused by the British Army after being found in a derelict farmhouse in Cappagh, County Tyrone.
- 27 May 1994: an IRA unit raked a British Army checkpoint with gunfire from a Ford Transit van at Aughnacloy, County Tyrone, then crossed the border into the Republic. British soldiers returned fire.
- 28 May 1994: the IRA reported firing a ".50 armour-piercing shell" at a British armoured vehicle in the Ardoyne area of Belfast.
- 30 May 1994: an IRA unit launched a mortar attack on a British Army base in Tempo, County Fermanagh. The projectile overshot the base and exploded beside several homes and a school.
- 31 May 1994: an IRA anti-personnel shrapnel bomb hidden in a car failed to detonate and was defused in Crossmaglen, County Armagh.
- 1 June 1994:
  - an IRA sniper fired a single shot at British Army checkpoint in Crossmaglen, County Armagh. A soldier narrowly escaped injury when he turned to speak to a colleague.
  - the IRA claimed responsibility for an under-car booby-trap bomb which fell from a vehicle entering North Queen Street RUC station, Belfast.
- 2 June 1994: an IRA coffee-jar bomb attack on the High Court of Belfast left one worker injured. A single volunteer cycling on a mountain bike threw the improvised grenade over the security fence; a plainclothes RUC officer fired several shots at him as he escaped on foot.
- 4 June 1994: Billy Wright a leading UVF loyalist paramilitary (and later leader of the breakaway LVF) was injured in an IRA bomb attack in Portadown. A second bomb exploded when security services were responding to the incident in which three RUC officers and a 10-year-old boy received minor injuries. About 20 houses were damaged.
- 6 June 1994:
  - an IRA unit launched an armour-piercing projectile at an RUC armoured vehicle in the Poleglass area of Belfast. British soldiers in the convoy returned fire.
  - a British Army bomb disposal team carried out the controlled explosion of a suspect device on a railway line in Kent, England, following IRA warnings.
- 7 June 1994:
  - the British Army defused a van containing a 100 lb (45 kg) bomb parked outside the RUC base in Dromore, County Tyrone.
  - the British Army made safe a 1.54 lb (0.70 kg) command-wire detonated Semtex bomb discovered in a garden in the Monagh Road area of West Belfast.
- 10 June 1994:
  - an IRA active service unit armed with AK-47 rifles fired several shots at a Garda escort vehicle during a robbery of a postal van on the Kilmallock/Bruff road in County Limerick.
  - three British soldiers were wounded when an IRA unit mortared a military checkpoint in Crossmaglen, South Armagh.
  - two incendiary devices were discovered and neutralised in a business on Oxford Street, London.
- 11 June 1994:
  - an IRA sniper fired a single shot at a British Army checkpoint on the Dundalk Road, Crossmaglen, County Armagh. Soldiers returned fire but there were no reported injuries.
  - an incendiary device detonated in a shop in Oxford Street, London. A second device failed to detonate.
- 12 June 1994:
  - the IRA detonated a bomb but no members of the security forces were injured in Alfred Street, Belfast.
  - an IRA horizontal mortar attack was foiled after being discovered in a firing position in an empty house in Belfast. Three men present were arrested.
- 13 June 1994:
  - the IRA launched a horizontal mortar at a British Army Saxon APC on the Monagh bypass, Belfast.
  - an IRA bomb exploded at a railroad station in Hertfordshire, England. The IRA warned they had planted two other devices on the tracks.
  - an IRA sniper fired a single shot at a British soldier manning a checkpoint but missed near Kinawley, County Fermanagh.
- 17 June 1994: the IRA launched a horizontal mortar at an RUC patrol in West Belfast, but missed their target.
- 20 June 1994:
  - the IRA carried out a gun, rocket, and grenade attack on an RUC patrol in the Ainsworth Avenue area of Belfast.
  - the British Army neutralised the remnants of a Semtex coffee jar bomb found on waste ground in Clady, County Tyrone.
- 26 June 1994:
  - the IRA launched a mortar attack on Pomeroy RUC base, County Tyrone. The East Tyrone Brigade claimed they used a barrack-buster mortar bomb that landed within the walls of the base. The British Army claimed that the mortar exploded in a bog just outside the barracks' perimeter fence.
  - an IRA unit fired a horizontal mortar at a British Army Land Rover on Suffolk Road, West Belfast. There were no reported injuries.
- 28 June 1994: an IRA unit fired a rocket from a hijacked vehicle at Grosvenor Road RUC station, Belfast.

=== July–August ===
- 2 July 1994: three IRA Mk-15 mortar rounds hit the Royal Irish Regiment barracks and its surroundings at Malone Road, Belfast, damaging buildings inside the compound. A number of people attending a wedding in a nearby church were treated from shock. A total of seven people was injured. The IRA said it was their first use of the Mk-15 type mortar in Belfast.
- 5 July 1994: an unexploded coffee jar-type anti-personnel bomb was found and defused by the British Army in Patrick Street, Newry.
- 8 July 1994: two British soldiers were seriously injured when their patrol vehicle was hit by a horizontal mortar in the Suffolk area of Belfast.
- 10 July 1994: IRA members launched a gun attack on the home of DUP politician Willie McCrea, in Magherafelt, County Londonderry; there was some damage but no injuries. It was later reported that the IRA leadership reprimanded and stood down the East Tyrone Brigade unit responsible for the shooting.
- 11 July 1994:
  - a member of the Ulster Democratic Party, Ray Smallwoods, was shot dead by the IRA in Lisburn. A five-member IRA unit consisting of four men and one woman took over a nearby house the night before. As he left his home the next morning one IRA volunteer ran down the street and blasted him several times with a shotgun. Smallwoods was a leading member of the UDA and was one of those involved in the unsuccessful assassination attempts on the lives of Bernadette and Michael McAliskey.
  - a mercury tilt-switch bomb was defused by the British Army on Halliday's Road in a loyalist area of North Belfast. The IRA was blamed.
- 12 July 1994:
  - a two-ton IRA lorry bomb was discovered in Heysham, England.
  - an RAF Puma helicopter was hit by an IRA mortar over Newtownhamilton, County Armagh, and forced to crash-land on a GAA pitch.
- 13 July 1994:
  - a bomb exploded at the home of a former DUP councillor on Rogully Road near Moneymore, County Londonderry. IRA members were believed to be responsible.
  - a barrack buster mortar was defused by the British Army at a workshop in the Shantallow area of Derry shortly before an attack. IRA members had occupied the premises and taken several people hostage.
- 14 July 1994: a bomb with an attached command wire was found in the Hazelwood Avenue area of Belfast. IRA members had abandoned the planned ambush after occupying a nearby house for several hours.
- 15 July 1994: three constables, an arrested Sinn Féin councillor and an elderly woman motorist were wounded when an IRA unit on an armed heavy truck ambushed an armoured RUC vehicle in Killeeshil, near Dungannon, County Tyrone (see Killeeshil ambush).
- 17 July 1994: a female Catholic civilian from Belfast (Caroline Moreland) was shot dead by the IRA, who alleged she was an informer. Her body was found at Clogh, near Rosslea, County Fermanagh.
- 18 July 1994:
  - an IRA unit dropped a 4 lb (1.8 kg) Semtex bomb onto a British Army patrol from a high-rise building in the New Lodge area of Belfast but the bomb failed to explode.
  - British security forces defused an anti-personnel bomb containing 2.2 lb (1.00 kg) of Semtex in the Short Strand area of Belfast.
- 20 July 1994:
  - the IRA launched a mortar attack on a British Army border observation post three miles from Crossmaglen, County Armagh.
  - an RUC officer was injured in Cookstown, County Tyrone, when an IRA roadside bomb struck an RUC mobile patrol. The IRA claim that the device contained 1 pound (0.45 kg) of Semtex and shrapnel, and was set off by command wire.
- 21 July 1994: an IRA suitcase-bomb was discovered at Reading railway station, Reading, England.
- 22 July 1994: IRA incendiary bombs damaged several businesses in Belfast city centre and the city suburbs. The incendiary bomb attacks were accompanied by dozens of hoax bomb alerts. Hoax bombs were also left at three railway stations over the weekend.
- 24 July 1994: the IRA detonated a 500 lb (230 kg) landmine as an RUC patrol vehicle passed in Castlewellan, County Down.
- 25 July 1994: a British soldier was shot and wounded by an IRA sniper in Crossmaglen, County Armagh.
- 26 July 1994: an IRA improvised grenade launcher was found concealed in a bin by an RUC patrol in Hillman Street in the New Lodge area of Belfast, with a command wire leading from the bin to the rear of houses. Several people were arrested in a follow-up operation.
- 28 July 1994: the IRA attached a booby-trap bomb to the underside of an RUC officer's car at a hotel in Newcastle, County Down. The device was spotted and later defused by the British Army.
- 29 July 1994:
  - up to 46 people were injured when the IRA fired three mortar bombs into Newry RUC base; 38 civilians, three RUC officers and five British soldiers were among the wounded. One of the injured soldiers was described as "very serious" and another "critical".
  - an IRA unit lobbed an improvised grenade at British soldiers after luring them out of Springfield Road RUC station, Belfast, with a hijacked van; as they retreated to safety a remote bomb was detonated. The IRA claimed to have injured two soldiers.
  - the IRA abandoned hoax car bombs across Belfast, causing widespread disruption.
- 31 July 1994: two senior UDA members, Raymond Elder and Joe Bratty, were shot dead by the IRA on the Ormeau Road in Belfast. The pair were ambushed by two IRA gunmen armed with AK-47 assault rifles. Up to 50 shots were fired and Bratty was hit at least 18 times. As the UDA men lay wounded on the ground one of the IRA volunteers leaned over them shooting at close range. As the IRA unit made their escape in a getaway car they were pursued by the RUC, shots were exchanged before the IRA car was brought to a halt but the gunmen escaped on foot.
- 3 August 1994: three British soldiers were injured when the IRA mortared the joint RUC/British Army base in Newtownhamilton, County Armagh.
- 6 August 1994: the IRA fired a grenade from a vehicle at a sangar at the junction of Chichester Street and Oxford Street, beside Belfast High Court. An RUC officer and a civilian were injured. Other sources reported that a soldier was also hurt.
- 8 August 1994: an off-duty British soldier from the Royal Irish Regiment (Trelford Withers, aged 46) was shot dead by the IRA in Crossgar, County Down. The soldier was shot twice in the side of the head by a lone IRA gunman. He was the last British soldier to be killed before the IRA's 1994 ceasefire.
- 12 August 1994:
  - the IRA reported they fired three mortars at a British Army observation tower at Glassdrummond, County Armagh.
  - the IRA claimed responsibility for a horizontal mortar found deployed in the Whittaker Street area of Derry, but stated the device had not been primed.
- 13 August 1994:
  - an explosive device left in a bicycle detonated in a shopping centre in the beach town of Bognor Regis, West Sussex, damaging 15 shops but causing no injuries.
  - an explosive device left in a bicycle found on Brighton Pier was made safe using a controlled explosion.
- 17 August 1994:
  - the IRA bombed the loyalist Grove Tavern pub on the York Road; patrons were ordered to exit the building by IRA members before the bomb exploded.
  - the IRA attempted to bomb the loyalist Berlin Arms pub in the Shankill area of Belfast but were unable to gain entry. The device was later defused by the British Army.
- 18 August 1994:
  - Martin Cahill, a Dublin criminal, was shot dead by the IRA outside his home in Rathmines. He was shot four times at close range with a .357 Magnum revolver through the window of his car. The IRA claimed he was closely associated with the UVF and had aided them in the attack on the Widow Scallans Pub in Dublin on 21 May 1994 in which an IRA volunteer was shot dead.
  - the IRA exploded two blast incendiaries at the Kimberley Inn off the Ormeau Road. The IRA claimed that like other attacks that week, the premises was targeted because it was used by loyalist paramilitaries to plan attacks.
  - the IRA was responsible for hoax bomb alerts at about a dozen loyalist pubs and clubs across Belfast. RUC sources believed they were to facilitate intelligence-gathering on loyalist paramilitaries and security forces.
- 21 August 1994:
  - the IRA mortared a joint RUC/British Army base in Rosslea, County Fermanagh. No casualties were reported and a timed secondary device destroyed the launch vehicle afterwards.
  - an IRA bomb destroyed the empty car of a British soldier in Maghera, County Londonderry.
- 22 August 1994: a high explosive device was defused outside a Laura Ashley shop in Regent Street, London.
- 23 August 1994: an IRA unit armed with two general-purpose machine guns fired 100 rounds at a joint RUC/British Army checkpoint on Craigavon Bridge, Derry from the east bank of the Foyle.
- 25 August 1994: British security forces uncovered a command wire leading to a roadside device (absent explosives) in the area of Annaghmore Road, Coalisland, County Tyrone.
- 26 August 1994:
  - an IRA mortar bomb missed the RUC base at Donemana, County Tyrone.
  - the IRA launched a mortar attack on the RUC station in Belleek, County Fermanagh; 60 families were evacuated in the aftermath.
  - an IRA mortar bomb exploded prematurely in its launch tube at a car-park in Downpatrick, County Down, injuring 10 people.
- 27 August 1994:
  - an IRA mortar bomb fired from a farm trailer exploded 200 yards short of Cloghoge checkpoint, County Armagh.
  - an IRA unit lobbed two improvised grenades into Tennent Street RUC station, Belfast. Afterwards a primed horizontal mortar was found in a car behind the base and defused by British security forces.
- 29 August 1994: the IRA fired a rocket at the RUC base in Toome, County Antrim.
- 30 August 1994:
  - incendiary devices damaged two stores in Belfast, on Boucher Road and on Newtownards Road.
  - an incendiary device was defused outside a B&Q store in Belfast.
  - the IRA carried out a coffee jar bomb attack on an RUC base at Springfield Road, Belfast.
  - the IRA launched a mortar bomb at Fort Whiterock British Army base at Springfield Road, Belfast.
  - a huge booby-trap bomb, disguised to look like a primed IRA Mark-15 improvised mortar in firing position, was found inside a van near Pomeroy RUC base, County Tyrone. The 550 lb (250 kg) device was defused by British army technicians.
  - a blast incendiary bomb exploded outside Hanover House, a restaurant in Coagh, County Tyrone, following an IRA telephone warning. The restaurant received minor damage, while five cars parked nearby were struck by shrapnel.
- 31 August 1994:
  - shots were fired at British security forces in the vicinity of New Barnsley RUC station in Belfast.
  - shots were fired at an RUC station in Belleek, County Fermanagh, less than an hour before the IRA ceasefire.
  - shots were fired in the Markets area of Belfast, just ten minutes before the IRA ceasefire came into effect. There were no reported injuries.
  - explosions were reportedly heard in the vicinity of Cappagh, County Tyrone, half an hour before the IRA ceasefire.
  - IRA members fired small arms in the outskirts of Pomeroy around midnight.
  - the IRA declared the first of two ceasefires in the 1990s: "Recognising the potential of the current situation and in order to enhance the democratic process and underlying our definitive commitment to its success, the leadership of the IRA have decided that as of midnight, August 31, there will be a complete cessation of military operations. All our units have been instructed accordingly."

=== September–December ===
- 6 September 1994: six IRA volunteers attempted to escape from Whitemoor Jail in Cambridgeshire, England.
- 22 September 1994: a Derry man sustained a broken leg in an IRA punishment beating.
- 16 October 1994: several shots were fired from an IRA weapon in Brook Drive, near Woodburn RUC station in West Belfast. Security sources believed it was an accidental discharge during transit.
- 10 November 1994: a Post Office worker (Frank Kerr) was shot dead when IRA members raided a Royal Mail sorting office in Newry. The IRA admitted their men had carried out the attack but claimed it was not sanctioned by the Army Council and that the ceasefire still stood.

== 1995 ==
- 29 April 1995: a drug dealer suspected of importing ecstasy tablets into Northern Ireland was shot dead by two gunmen in a bar in central Belfast. The IRA did not claim responsibility but security forces stated that they were responsible. This killing was the first planned assassination by the IRA since the 1994 ceasefire.
- 5 September 1995: Tony Kane (aged 29) was shot dead by the IRA as he sat in his car in Andersonstown, Belfast. Kane had been named as a drug dealer on posters placed around West Belfast.
- 8 December 1995: Paul Devine (35), an alleged drug-dealer was killed by an IRA unit. He shot seven times in the back and head in south Belfast. The victim had previously served time in prison for handling stolen goods.
- 18 December 1995: Francis Collins (40), who had been a former member of the IRA, was shot dead at his shop in Lepper Street, New Lodge, Belfast. Responsibility for the killing was claimed by Direct Action Against Drugs (DAAD), a cover name (pseudonym) used by the IRA.
- 19 December 1995: Chris Johnston (38), a Catholic civilian, was shot dead outside his home in Cooke Street, off Ormeau Road, Belfast. Responsibility for the killing was claimed by Direct Action Against Drugs (DAAD), a cover name (pseudonym) used by the IRA.
- 27 December 1995: Martin McCrory (30), a Catholic civilian was shot dead at his home, Norglen Parade, Turf Lodge, Belfast. Responsibility for the killing was claimed by Direct Action Against Drugs (DAAD), a cover name (pseudonym) used by the IRA.

== 1996 ==
=== February–April ===
- 2 February 1996: fifty-seven shots were fired at the home of an RUC officer near Moy, County Tyrone. British security forces believed the IRA were involved.
- 9 February 1996: the IRA ended its 1994 ceasefire with a massive lorry-bombing in East London adjacent to the South Quay DLR station in London Docklands. Two civilians (Inan Ul-Haq Bashir and John Jefferies) were killed in the bombing. The initial estimate of the damage caused was £85m.
- 15 February 1996: a bomb placed in a phone booth on the Charing Cross Road in London was made safe using a controlled explosion.
- 18 February 1996: an improvised high explosive device detonated prematurely on a bus in Aldwych, in central London, killing Edward O'Brien, the IRA operative transporting the device and injuring 8 others.
- 9 March 1996: the IRA claimed responsibility for a small bomb which exploded on the Old Brompton Road in London.
- 31 March 1996: the IRA handed over £20,000 pounds of captured cannabis to a priest in Newry who then handed it over to the RUC. The IRA said they had captured it from a drug-dealer.
- 6 April 1996: the IRA attempted to destroy Hammersmith Bridge after installing two devices containing nearly 30 lb (14 kg) of Semtex on the south bank of the River Thames, London. Though the detonators exploded, the bomb failed to ignite. The bridge was closed for three years to endure a major restoration following the bombing.
- 17 April: the IRA exploded a bomb outside The Boltons on Earl's Court Road in west London at 10pm. A warning was given and there were no injuries but extensive damage was caused to the surrounding area.

=== June–December ===
- 7 June 1996: Detective Garda Jerry McCabe was shot dead by the IRA during a botched post-office robbery in Adare, County Limerick.
- 15 June 1996: the IRA detonated a 3,000 lb (1,400 kg) bomb in Manchester, injuring 212 people and causing damage valued at £411m but no fatalities. This was the largest IRA bomb ever detonated in Great Britain, and the largest bomb to explode in Great Britain since the Second World War.
- 28 June 1996: an IRA unit mortared a British Army base at Osnabrück in Germany. The attack caused widespread damage when a shell landed near the base's fuel depot.
- 13 July 1996: an IRA unit in Ardoyne, north Belfast were responsible for three separate gun attacks during the widespread unrest that followed the RUC's decision to force the Orange Order march at Drumcree. IRA Brigade staff ordered an inquiry and carried out disciplinary measures in response; the IRA had yet to re-commence operations in Northern Ireland at this time.
- 16 September 1996: a Catholic civilian (John Devlin) was shot dead at his friend's home in the Markets area of Belfast. Responsibility for the killing was claimed by Direct Action Against Drugs (DAAD). He had recently been ordered to leave Northern Ireland by the IRA.
- 23 September 1996:
  - a man escaped an attack by DAAD gunmen by jumping out a window in the Roden Street area of Belfast.
  - an English-born IRA volunteer, Diarmuid O'Neill, was shot dead by British police during a raid on his home in Hammersmith, London.
- 7 October 1996: the IRA detonated two car bombs at the British Army's Northern Ireland HQ, Thiepval Barracks, killing a British soldier, Warrant Officer James Bradwell (who died four days later of multiple wounds), and injuring 21 other soldiers and 11 civilian workers (see Thiepval barracks bombing).
- 5 December 1996: the security forces found IRA shoulder-fired MK16 launchers in the Whiterock area of Belfast.
- 8 December 1996: the IRA shot dead an alleged drug dealer (Peter 'Psycho' Judge) at his girlfriend's apartment at Foster Terrace, Ballybough, Dublin.
- 11 December 1996:
  - an IRA mortar attack on a British Army base at Girdwood, Belfast, was foiled by the security forces.
  - a 1 kg (2.2 lb) Semtex bomb was found in a wheelie bin in Duncairn Gardens, Belfast following a call made to the Samaritans using an IRA code word.
- 20 December 1996: an RUC officer was shot and injured in an IRA gun attack in a Belfast children's hospital. The officer was protecting DUP Councillor Nigel Dodds.

== 1997 ==
=== January–February ===
- 1 January 1997: two bombs containing approximately 500 lb (230 kg) of explosive were defused at Belfast Castle. The IRA claimed responsibility, stating they had been forced to abandon the bomb because of security forces activity.
- 5 January 1997: a 250 lb (110 kg) bomb was defused in a derelict building near Cullyhanna, County Armagh. Reports suggested the device had been in place for some time rather than recently planted.
- 6 January 1997:
  - an RUC officer was injured when an IRA rocket hit a security hut at the Royal Courts of Justice in Belfast.
  - in the call claiming responsibility for the Courts rocket attack, the IRA also claimed to have left bombs at several sites in Belfast.
- 7 January 1997: the IRA claimed responsibility for a mortar bomb attack on an RUC vehicle patrol at Templemore Road in the Shantallow area of Derry. There were no reported injuries.
- 10 January 1997:
  - an IRA statement was issued in the Andersontown News saying that "action" would be taken against informers.
  - the IRA claimed responsibility for numerous bomb alerts in Lisburn and Belfast. British Army bomb disposal units carried out several controlled explosions in response.
- 11 January 1997:
  - the RUC base in Tempo, County Fermanagh was mortared by the IRA. Two mortar shells landed inside the base, one crashing through the building's roof, but both failed to detonate.
  - several shots were fired at a British Army observation post on the roof of high-rise block of flats in the New Lodge area of Belfast. The IRA is suspected.
- 13 January 1997: an IRA unit fired a horizontal mortar at a joint British Army/RUC patrol on Kennedy Way in Belfast. There were no injuries.
- 18 January 1997:
  - an IRA unit fired two horizontal mortars at an armoured RUC patrol in Downpatrick, County Down. There were no injuries. The weapon was a new dual-tube type, according to the IRA.
  - an IRA horizontal mortar attack was foiled after an RUC patrol spotted two men acting suspiciously in Crawford Square, Derry.
- 20 January 1997: an IRA unit hurled two explosive devices at a British armoured vehicle as it left Mountpottinger RUC barracks, County Antrim. There were no injuries.
- 26 January 1997: three British soldiers were thrown off their feet after an IRA bomb attached to their car exploded as the driver examined it in Ballynahinch, County Down. One soldier was slightly injured.
- 27 January 1997: an IRA unit fired an RPG rocket at an RUC Land Rover in Toome, County Antrim.
- 28 January 1997: an IRA unit fired two horizontal mortars at an armoured RUC patrol on the Springfield Road, Belfast. Two civilians were injured.
- 5 February 1997: the IRA carried out a horizontal mortar attack against an RUC patrol at Dungannon, County Tyrone. More than 40 families were evacuated in the aftermath.
- 6 February 1997:
  - an improvised explosive device was thrown at an RUC mobile patrol in the nationalist area of Killwilkie state, Lurgan, County Armagh.
  - a horizontal mortar was discovered by British security forces in Prince's Street, Lurgan.
- 7 February 1997: the IRA fired three shots at an unmarked British Army Isuzu Trooper vehicle near Antrim town. The two soldiers inside did not return fire and weren't injured.
- 9 February 1997: the IRA reported a Volunteer threw an explosive device at an RUC patrol in Pomeroy, County Tyrone, injuring an RUC officer. News reports described the incident as a horizontal attack and stated three RUC officers were injured.
- 10 February 1997:
  - a 1,000 lb (450 kg) landmine was discovered on the A5 motorway between Strabane and Omagh, County Tyrone. The IRA said it was intended for a British patrol but the presence of civilians in the area forced them to disarm the device.
- 12 February 1997: a British soldier was shot dead by a sniper near the British Army base in Bessbrook, County Armagh. Lance Bombardier Stephen Restorick was the last British soldier to be killed in Northern Ireland during Operation Banner.
- 13 February 1997: an IRA anti-personnel shrapnel and Semtex bomb was defused in the Kilwikie area of Lurgan, County Armagh.
- 20 February 1997: an IRA ambush was foiled after the RUC uncovered two AK-47 rifles and an improvised grenade in Conway Lane on the outskirts of West Belfast. Two men were arrested.
- 22 February 1997: an IRA mortar unit was intercepted by the RUC in Caledon, County Tyrone, on its way to carry out an attack on a British security facility. IRA sources claimed that a five-mile (8 km) chase followed before the IRA volunteers managed to escape on foot.
- 27 February 1997: an IRA mortar attack on a joint RUC/British Army patrol in the Falls Road area of Belfast was aborted and the device later defused by British security forces.

=== March–April ===
- 2 March 1997: a primed IRA mortar was discovered near Warrenpoint, County Down and disarmed by the British Army following warnings from the IRA.
- 6 March 1997: the IRA detonated a 2 lb (0.91 kg) bomb on Glenalina Road, Belfast as a joint British Army/RUC patrol passed.
- 7 March 1997: an IRA bomb left near Dungannon, County Tyrone, was defused by the British Army.
- 13 March 1997:
  - an armoured Land Rover from the 2nd Battalion, the Royal Tank Regiment was hit and damaged by an IRA RPG rocket in Ardoyne, Belfast. A soldier in the observation post at the vehicle's roof hatch was injured. Several people were arrested in the aftermath.
  - two British soldiers and an RUC officer were injured in an IRA remote-detonation bomb attack in the Short Strand area of Belfast.
  - the IRA issued a statement claiming two coffee jar bombs had been thrown at British soldiers in the Poleglass area of West Belfast but failed to explode.
- 18 March 1997:
  - the IRA warned a bomb had been left in Derrylin, County Fermanagh. The village was sealed off for a time.
- 26 March 1997:
  - the IRA carried out a double bomb attack on a mainline railway and signal box in Wilmslow, England. There was also a hoax bomb alert on the main Doncaster line. The attacks caused major and widespread railway and traffic disruption.
  - a 1 kg home-made bomb was thrown by IRA volunteers to the Army/RUC base at Coalisland, County Tyrone. The device blew a hole in the perimeter fence. Undercover British soldiers shot and seriously injured 19 year-old republican Gareth Doris seconds later. The soldiers left the scene under the protection of the RUC after being cornered by a crowd and after firing shots in the air. Two women were wounded by plastic bullets fired by RUC officers (see 1997 Coalisland attack).
- 28 March 1997: an IRA unit lobbed two blast bombs at a joint RUC/British Army patrol in Roslea, County Fermanagh.
- 29 March 1997:
  - a 900 kg (2,000 lb) IRA bomb was discovered by a road and defused at Ballykinler British Army base, County Down.
  - an RUC officer was badly wounded when he was shot by a sniper outside Forkill joint security base, County Armagh.
- 3 April 1997: the discovery of two bombs on main motorways in England following coded warnings by the IRA resulted in widespread disruption.
- 6 April 1997: The British Grand National horse race at Aintree Racecourse was abandoned after the IRA warned that bombs had been planted in the area. No explosive devices were found.
- 10 April 1997:
  - a group of sixteen undercover SAS members restrained seven people, at least four of them IRA volunteers, part of one of the two sniper teams which operated in South Armagh, and handed them over to the RUC, after tracking the IRA militants to a farm complex. The owner of the farm was also arrested. Three men were released on 17 April.
  - a female RUC officer was shot and badly wounded by an IRA sniper firing from a vehicle in Derry City.
  - the IRA attacked two British border checkpoints near Rosslea, County Fermanagh, one at Killyvilly and the other at Clonatty Bridge. Both facilities were raked with sniper and automatic gunfire.
- 14 April 1997: a civilian went into hiding after he was badly beaten in an IRA punishment attack in Derry.
- 18 April 1997: a series of bombs and bomb alerts brought Britain's transport system to a halt and effectively cut all the main routes connecting England to Scotland. Bomb alerts closed large sections of the M6 motorway. a bomb exploded closing Leeds railway station while another bomb explosion at a rail bridge in Doncaster halted both rail and motorway traffic.
- 21 April 1997: IRA bomb hoaxes almost entirely closed down London's transport links. King's Cross, St. Pancras, Charing Cross, Paddington, Baker Street and all three railway stations at Watford junction were evacuated due to bomb alerts. Soon after alerts closed Gatwick, Stansted and parts of Heathrow airports. By 9:00 am, at the height of the rush hour, London was 'gridlocked' with a ten-mile (16 km) jam on the M25.
- 25 April 1997: two bombs planted by the IRA blew up next to M6 motorway in central England. A 132,000 volt electricity pylon was damaged.
- 29 April 1997: Britain's transport industry claimed minimum losses of £30 million after a series of IRA bomb alerts in southern England brought traffic to a standstill.

=== May–July ===
- 31 May 1997: a massive IRA landmine was discovered in Poleglass, West Belfast. The IRA said the device was intended for a British patrol but claimed the attack was abandoned due to the proximity of civilians to the ambush site. The firing mechanism was disabled and a warning phoned in.
- 1 June 1997: several rifle rounds were fired at New Barnsley joint British Army-RUC base in West Belfast. There was speculation that the IRA were responsible, although the INLA were suspected also.
- 2 June 1997: the IRA claimed they abandoned an anti-personnel bomb near Girdwood Barracks in the Antrim Road area of Belfast, following an attack aborted because of the presence civilians.
- 5 June 1997: the IRA carried out a punishment attack with a sawn-off shotgun in the Markets area of Belfast. The victim later had his leg amputated.
- 10 June 1997: the IRA carried out a gun attack on an undercover British Army unit in Derry. There were no reported injuries.
- 16 June 1997: two RUC officers (John Graham and David Johnston) were shot dead in an IRA ambush while on foot patrol in Lurgan, County Armagh. Both officers were shot at point blank range in the back of the head.
- 25 June 1997: an IRA gun attack on an RUC patrol in the Dunmurry area of south Belfast was foiled by British security forces. One man was arrested and two AK-47 rifles recovered. The RUC initially raided the wrong house, firing CS gas canisters inside and putting a gun to the owners head. The RUC later apologised.
- 26 June 1997: an IRA unit fired a rocket propelled grenade at an RUC armoured patrol in north Belfast. The rocket glanced off the vehicle and exploded in an empty building.
- 6 July 1997:
  - the IRA carried out a number of blast-bomb and gun attacks on the RUC across Belfast City in the course of fierce riots which erupted in nationalist areas after the Orange Order was allowed to march on Drumcree (see 1997 nationalist riots in Northern Ireland).
  - an RUC patrol manning a mobile checkpoint on a bridge over the river Lagan in Lower Ormeau was engaged with an AK-47 rifle by a lone IRA volunteer, according to republican reports.
  - an IRA volunteer shot at a stationary RUC armoured vehicle beside the local RUC base in Coalisland, County Tyrone, seriously wounding a female RUC officer.
  - a military base in West Belfast came under gun and grenade attack from an IRA unit. A Protestant teenager was shot in the shoulder.
  - another Army base at the end of Lenadoon Avenue suffered a similar attack, according to republican sources.
  - the IRA claimed that one of their units fired a rocket at an RUC patrol on Hallidays Road area, New Lodge, Belfast.
  - the IRA claimed to have forced a British Army riot squad to retreat from the Belfast Markets area after engaging them with machine gun fire.
  - an IRA active service unit exchanged fire with RUC/British Army forces setting up a checkpoint at Falls Road, according to republican sources.
- 7 July 1997:
  - an RUC mobile patrol driving through Crumlin Road was forced to withdraw from the Ardoyne area when it was hit by 20 rounds fired from an IRA unit. The RUC returned fire.
  - an IRA volunteer fired 15 shots at a British soldier who was firing plastic bullets at rioters at the junction of Woodvale and Crumlin Roads, forcing him to take cover.
  - an IRA sniper fired a single shot at an RUC constable at Alliance Avenue.
  - RUC forces received small arms fire at Armagh town amid widespread unrest, which included damage to local businesses and the beating of a Protestant teenager.
  - The IRA claimed to have engaged an RUC patrol and a security checkpoint in the city with gunfire followed by a petrol bomb attack.
  - a train near Lurgan, County Armagh, was boarded by seven IRA masked men and set on fire, destroying five carriages. In a crossing just 50 yards from the spot, eight men wearing combat jackets and balaclavas directed traffic for several hours.
- 8 July 1997:
  - an RUC officer was shot in the arm and leg during unrest in the Garvaghy Road area of Portadown.
  - IRA militants firing automatic weapons beat off an attempt by British soldiers and RUC officers to regain control of the streets around a Catholic housing in North Belfast where rioters had erected barricades.
- 9 July 1997:
  - a landmine was planted by the IRA near Dungannon, County Tyrone, where there was also a bomb alert.
  - IRA gunmen hijacked and burned a number of vehicles at Dungannon, County Tyrone.
- 11 July 1997:
  - three British soldiers and two RUC officers were injured when the IRA launched a gun and bomb attack on their Saxon armoured vehicle at a checkpoint in Oldpark, North Belfast.
  - an IRA unit threw a blast bomb at an RUC patrol in the Suffolk area of Belfast.
- 12 July 1997: a Mark-15 mortar bomb was fired at Newtownhamilton British Army barracks, South Armagh. The shell exploded just outside the perimeter fence, on waste land beside the base helipad.
- 13 July 1997: the IRA claimed responsibility for shooting two men in the knees in Newry. They claimed the men were criminals who had been responsible for assaulting two members of Sinn Féin as well as stealing from local businesses.
- 17 July 1997: Former IRA member and Sinn Féin councillor Paul Butler and "other republicans" claimed to have uncovered an abandoned British Army observation post concealed in a flat in the Summerhill area of Twinbrook, Belfast, The apartment was allegedly used during the riots to track the neighbours' movements. A number of British Army items was found.
- 19 July 1997: the IRA declared a second ceasefire. They state that: "We have ordered the unequivocal restoration of the ceasefire of August 1994. All IRA units have been instructed accordingly".

=== September–December ===
- 12 September 1997: four IRA volunteers stopped a member of the Continuity IRA (CIRA) in Ardoyne and confiscated his gun.
- October 1997:
  - the Continuity IRA accused the IRA of destroying one of their bombs south of the border before it could be transported north.
  - an IRA volunteer assaulted and injured a Continuity IRA volunteer as he attempted to place a bomb in a bank in Derry City.
- 10 December 1997: Liam Averill, an IRA volunteer, escaped from the Maze Prison by dressing up as a woman and boarding a coach which was transporting prisoners' families.

== 1998 ==
- 9 February 1998: a convicted drug-dealer (Brendan Campbell) was shot dead by the IRA on Lisburn Road, Belfast.
- 10 February 1998: The IRA was believed to be responsible for killing UDA member Bobby Dougan. Sinn Féin was temporarily excluded from peace talks as a result on 20 February. He had previously escaped an INLA assassination attempt in October 1993, and was shot and wounded by the IRA in April 1994.
- 19 February 1998: suspect smuggler Kevin Conway was abducted from his home at Lurgan and shot dead, allegedly by IRA members.
- 20 February 1998: A CIRA a 500 lb car bomb exploded outside the RUC base in Moira, County Down. Seven RUC officers and four civilians were hurt. Journalist Toby Harnden reported that the Provisional IRA South Armagh Brigade took part in the CIRA operation.
- 23 February 1998: a CIRA 300 lb car bomb exploded near the RUC base on Edward Street in Portadown, County Armagh. Toby Harnden says that the Provisional IRA South Armagh Brigade was also involved in this incident.
- 10 March 1998:
  - the IRA were allegedly responsible for a fire bomb attack which destroyed the Derby House bar on Stewartstown Road, west Belfast. The RUC said masked men were seen at the bar at just before the explosion; the owner said a member of staff had been threatened by four men who said they were from the IRA and demanded to be let into the premises.
  - The Provisional IRA is suspected of firing six mortar bombs at an RUC base in Armagh city. Unionist politician David Trimble said the RUC believed there was some IRA involvement.
- 23 March 1998: Volunteers from the Provisional IRA South Armagh Brigade assisted dissident republicans in a mortar attack on a security base at Forkhill, according to Toby Harnden.
- 24 March 1998: The Provisional IRA South Armagh Brigade also aided dissident republicans in a mortar attack on a British Army watchtower at Glassdrumman, according to Toby Harnden.
- 10 April 1998: The Good Friday Agreement is signed in Belfast. The Provisional IRA eventually gave their open approval to the treaty in the subsequent referendum.
- 19 July 1998: a civilian from New Lodge, Belfast (Andrew Kearney) was shot in the legs and died of his injuries. His family claimed he was killed by the IRA after he got the better of an IRA volunteer in a physical confrontation in North Belfast.
- 8 October 1998: the USA removed the Provisional IRA from its list of foreign terrorist organizations.
- 21 November 1998: Gerard Moran, an alleged drug dealer was shot dead by the IRA in Dublin.

== 1999 ==
- 27 January 1999: a former IRA volunteer and RUC informant (Eamon Collins) was found dead near Newry, shortly after testifying against Thomas "Slab" Murphy, leader of the South Armagh Brigade in a libel case with the Sunday Times. Collins was badly beaten and had a spike pushed through his face.
- 9 May 1999: Brendan Fegan, a convicted drug dealer, was shot dead by the IRA in Newry.
- 13 June 1999: Paul Downey, a drug dealer, was kidnapped from a hotel in Newry by an IRA unit. He was shot in the head and his lifeless body dumped near Beleek.
- 17 June 1999: Double agent/former informant Martin McGartland was shot six times in an IRA assassination attempt at his home in Tyneside, England. He survived despite serious injuries.
- 30 July 1999: Charles Bennett was shot in a punishment attack outside a GAA club in West Belfast. He died of his injuries a short time later. The IRA is believed to have been responsible. It is believed he was suspected of stealing IRA weapons.

== See also ==
- List of attacks on British aircraft during The Troubles
- List of weapons used by the Provisional Irish Republican Army
- Improvised tactical vehicles of the Provisional IRA
- Timeline of Continuity Irish Republican Army actions
- Timeline of Real Irish Republican Army actions
- Timeline of Irish National Liberation Army actions
- Timeline of Ulster Volunteer Force actions
- Timeline of Ulster Defence Association actions
- Timeline of the Northern Ireland Troubles
