= Timeline of Ulster Defence Association actions =

This is a timeline of actions by the Ulster Defence Association (UDA), a loyalist paramilitary group formed in 1971. Most of these actions took place during the conflict known as "the Troubles" in Northern Ireland. The UDA's declared goal was to defend Loyalist areas from attack and to combat Irish republican paramilitaries. However, most of its victims were Irish Catholic civilians, who were often chosen at random.

It used the name Ulster Freedom Fighters (UFF) when it wished to claim responsibility for its attacks and avoid political embarrassment, as the UDA was a legal organisation for much of its history. The UFF usually claimed that those targeted were Provisional Irish Republican Army members or IRA sympathizers. Other times, attacks on Catholic civilians were claimed as "retaliation" for IRA actions, since the IRA drew most of its support from Catholics. Such retaliation was seen as both collective punishment and an attempt to weaken the IRA's support. However, during 1972 the organisation openly claimed responsibility for several gun and bomb attacks using the UDA title.

== 1970s ==
=== 1971 ===
- September: the Ulster Defence Association (UDA) was formed from various loyalist "defence groups" in Belfast.

=== 1972 ===
==== January–June ====
- 20 April: UDA members walked into a taxi depot on Clifton Street in Belfast and asked for a taxi to Ardoyne. From the location of the depot and the stated destination, they could be sure their driver was a Catholic. They forced the driver (Gerard Donnelly, aged 22) to stop at Harrybrook Street, where they killed him with a shot in the head.
- 4 May: a Catholic civilian (Victor Andrews, aged 20) was found stabbed to death in an entry off Baltic Avenue, New Lodge, Belfast. It is believed the UDA was responsible.
- 14 May: a Catholic civilian (Gerard McCusker, aged 24) was found beaten and shot dead on waste ground at Hopeton Street, Shankill Road, Belfast. It is believed the UDA was responsible.
- 17 May: the UDA kidnapped a Catholic civilian (Bernard Moane, aged 46) from a pub on the Shankill Road in Belfast. They took him to Knockagh War Memorial near Greenisland, County Antrim, and shot him to death.
- 23 May: the UDA shot dead a Catholic civilian (Andrew Brennan, aged 22) at his home on Sicily Park, Finaghy, Belfast.
- 10 June: the UDA carried out a drive-by shooting on a group of Catholic teenagers in Belfast. A Catholic civilian (Marian Brown, aged 17) was killed and a number of others wounded as they stood on the corner of Roden Street and Grosvenor Road. The British Army were on patrol when they exchanged shots with a gunman in the car, who was wielding a Thompson submachine gun.
- 11 June: the UDA shot dead a Catholic civilian (John Madden, aged 43) as he swept the footpath outside his shop on Oldpark Road, Belfast.
- 16 June: the UDA shot dead a Catholic civilian (Charles Connor, aged 32) at Minnowburn, Shaw's Bridge, Belfast.
- 24 June: a UDA paramilitary (John Brown, aged 29), was found shot near his home, Blackmountain Parade, Springmartin, Belfast. He had been killed in an internal Ulster Defence Association dispute.
- 26 June: a UDA volunteer (John Black, aged 32) was shot by the British Army at a barricade in Douglas Street, off Beersbridge Road, Belfast during street disturbances. He died five weeks later.
- 27 June: a UDA volunteer (William Galloway, aged 18) was shot dead by an unknown republican group in Edlingham Street, Tiger's Bay, Belfast during street disturbances.
- 30 June: the UDA began to set up "no-go areas" (urban areas which were entirely controlled by the group and blocked off by barricades). UDA members stopped and questioned people at these barricades and a number of them were killed, usually when they were found to be Catholic.

==== July ====
- 1 July: an English civilian visitor (Paul Jobling, aged 19) was found hooded and shot dead on waste ground, Westway Drive, Glencairn, Belfast. It is thought the UDA was responsible.
- 1 July: a Catholic civilian (Daniel Hayes, aged 40) was found shot dead in a playground at the mainly loyalist Penrith Street, Shankill, Belfast. A witness who lived nearby said he saw two men take a third out of a car and into the playground. The car driver said to the witness: "You are all right, it's the UDA". He then heard five shots.
- 2 July: two Catholic civilians (James Howell, aged 31, and Gerard McCrea, aged 27) were found hooded and shot dead in Belfast. Their bodies were found in different locations but it was believed they were killed together. Howell was found in McCrea's car, Cavour Street, off Old Lodge Road, Belfast. McCrea was found at Forthriver Road, Glencairn, Belfast. It is believed the UDA was responsible.
- 9 July: the Provisional Irish Republican Army (IRA) shot dead a UDA volunteer (Gerald Turkington, aged 32) on Stewart Street, Markets, Belfast.
- 10 July - the UDA was involved in a ten-hour long gun battle with Republican paramilitaries in the Lower Falls area of Belfast.
- 11 July: a Catholic civilian (Charles Watson, aged 21) was found shot dead off Carlisle Circus, Belfast. It is believed the UDA was responsible.
- 11/12 July: UDA and UVF members shot dead a 15-year-old Catholic civilian (David McClenaghan) in his home on Southport Street, Belfast. They also sexually assaulted his mother.
- 12 July: a UDA volunteer shot dead two civilians inside McCabe's Bar on High Street, Portadown, County Armagh. One (Jack McCabe, aged 48) was the pub's Catholic owner and the other (William Cochrane, aged 53) was a Protestant customer. Both were shot in the head at close range. The gunman was a former RUC officer who was sentenced to life imprisonment for the murders. There were shouts of "Keep up the fight!" from about a dozen people in the court's public gallery.
- 13 July: an off-duty Catholic Ulster Defence Regiment (UDR) soldier, Henry Russell (aged 23), was found dead at Larkfield Drive, Sydenham, Belfast. He had been burnt, stabbed, battered and shot in the head, reputedly as an alleged informer.
- 15 July: a Catholic civilian (Felix Hughes, aged 35) was kidnapped, beaten, tortured and shot dead by the UDA in a mainly loyalist area of Portadown. His body was found on 4 August 1972 in a drain near Watson Street.
- 19 July: a Protestant civilian (Hugh Wright, aged 21), was found shot dead in a field off Hightown Road, near Belfast.
- 21 July: the UDA shot dead a Catholic civilian (Anthony Davidson, aged 21) at his home on Clovelly Street, off Springfield Road, Belfast.
- 21 July: a UDA volunteer (William Irvine, aged 18) was killed in a car bomb explosion at Oxford Street Bus Station, Belfast. An inadequate warning had been given.
- 22 July: the UDA shot dead two Catholic civilians, Rosemary McCartney (aged 27) and Patrick O'Neill (aged 26). Their bodies were found in an abandoned car, Forthriver Road, Glencairn, Belfast.
- 24 July: the UDA shot dead a Protestant civilian, Frederick Maguire, aged 56, who was married to a Catholic, on Mayo Street, Shankill, Belfast. He was shot dead on his way to work at a linen mill.
- 25 July: the Official Irish Republican Army (OIRA) shot a UDA volunteer (James Kenna, aged 19) dead while he was walking at the junction of Roden and Clifford streets, Belfast. He was reportedly part of a Loyalist mob attempting to invade a Catholic area.
- 26 July: the UDA shot dead two Catholic civilians, Francis Corr (aged 52) and James McGerty (aged 26), in an abandoned car which they then burned on Summer Street, Lower Oldpark, Belfast.
- 27 July: the UDA shot dead a Catholic civilian (Francis McStravick, aged 42) off Linfield Road, Sandy Row, Belfast.
- 28 July: a Catholic (Philip Maguire, aged 55) was found shot dead in his firm's van on Carrowreagh Road, Dundonald, County Down. He was a founding member of the local credit union and a member of the paramilitary Catholic Ex-Servicemen's Association. It is believed the UDA was responsible.
- 29 July: the UDA shot dead a Catholic civilian (Daniel Dunne, aged 19) outside his home, Blackwood Street, off Ormeau Road, Belfast.

==== August–October ====
- 12 August: the body of a Catholic civilian (Francis Wynne, aged 37) was found in an abandoned car on Jaffa Street, Shankill, Belfast. He had been kidnapped, beaten and shot twice in the head by UDA volunteers.
- 13 August: the UDA stabbed a Catholic civilian (Thomas Madden, aged 48) to death in a shop doorway on Oldpark Road, Belfast. He was a night-watchman. The man had 110 stab wounds on all parts of his body.
- 18 August: the UDA shot dead a Catholic civilian (Philip Faye, aged 21) at his home on Island Street, Belfast.
- 27 August: the UDA shot dead a Protestant civilian (Thomas Boyd, aged 28) at his home on Carlisle Street, off Crumlin Road, Belfast.
- 31 August: the UDA shot dead a Catholic civilian (Patrick Devenney, aged 27) on Rugby Road, Belfast. The body was found in a sack.
- 31 August: a Catholic civilian (Eamon McMahon, aged 19) was found dead in the River Bann at Portadown. He had been tied up and beaten to death by UDA volunteers.
- 6 September: UDA volunteers threw a bomb into the home of Republican Labour Party councillor James O'Kane on Cedar Avenue, off Antrim Road, Belfast. A Catholic civilian (Bridget Breen, aged 33) was killed, and five others (including three children) were wounded.
- 13 September: the UDA opened fire inside the Catholic-owned Divis Castle Bar on Springfield Road, Belfast; one Catholic civilian, the owner's son (Patrick Doyle, aged 19), was killed.
- 13 September: the Royal Ulster Constabulary (RUC) shot dead a UDA volunteer (Robert Warnock, aged 18) during an attempted armed robbery at the Hillfoot Bar, Glen Road, Castlereagh, Belfast.
- 26 September: UDA volunteers shot dead a Catholic civilian (Paul McCartan, aged 52) near his home on Park Avenue, Strandtown, Belfast.
- 27 September: a Catholic civilian (James Boyle, aged 17) was found shot dead by Flush River, Elswick Street, near Springfield Road, Belfast. It is believed the UDA was responsible.
- 30 September: a Catholic civilian (Francis Lane, aged 23), was found shot dead on waste ground at Glencairn Road, Glencairn, Belfast. It is believed the UDA was responsible.
- 4 October: the UDA shot dead James McCartan, aged 21, a Catholic civilian. His body was found on waste ground, beside Connswater River, off Mersey Street, Belfast.
- 5 October: the UDA detonated a bomb at the Capitol Bar in Belfast, killing a Protestant civilian (John Magee, aged 54).
- 14 October: a Catholic man (Terence Maguire, aged 23) was found shot dead in an alley off Clandeboye Street, Belfast. It is believed the UDA was responsible. He is listed as a civilian by Sutton, but as a UDR soldier by Lost Lives.
- 14 October: two Catholic civilians (Leo John Duffy, aged 45, and Thomas Marron, aged 59) were killed in a gun attack on a Catholic-owned shop, Northern Wine Company, Tate's Avenue, off Lisburn Road, Belfast. It is believed the UDA was responsible.
- 16 October: two UDA volunteers (John Clarke, aged 26, and William Warnock, aged 15) were killed after being run over by British Army vehicles during riots in East Belfast.
- 16 October: the UDA claimed responsibility for a bomb attack on a fertiliser factory at Carrigans in County Donegal. A UDA spokesman stated it was not the first attack carried out by the group in the Republic of Ireland. The spokesman declined to say whether the UDA was responsible for a bomb attack on Buncrana police station the previous week.
- 16 October: a car bomb exploded in Clones, County Monaghan, seriously injuring one man and causing significant damage. The device detonated within minutes of a UDA bomb in Carrigans, County Donegal, and the group was believed to be responsible.
- 17 October: in response to the deaths of the previous day, the UDA opened fire on the British Army in some parts of Belfast, shooting a RUC officer (Gordon Harron, aged 32) on Shore Road, by Mount Vernon, Belfast. Harron died of his injuries on 21 October. A UDA volunteer was later convicted for the killing.
- 17 October: the British Army shot dead a UDA volunteer, who was also an off-duty UDR soldier (John Todd, aged 23) during street disturbances, Wilton Street, Shankill, Belfast.
- 31 October: the UDA detonated a car bomb outside Benny's Bar in Sailortown, Belfast. The blast killed two Catholic children, Paula Strong (aged 6) and Clare Hughes (aged 4), who were celebrating Halloween outside the pub. Twelve other people were injured.

==== November–December ====
- 2 November: the UDA's Londonderry Brigade claimed responsibility for bombing the Hole in the Wall pub in St Johnston, County Donegal, Republic of Ireland. UDA volunteers ordered everyone out of the pub and then destroyed it with a grenade.
- 5 November: the UDA claimed responsibility for bombing a mineral water plant in Muff, County Donegal.
- 12 November: the UDA shot dead a Catholic civilian as he got out of a car on Arthur Street, Newtownabbey. A close relative told the inquest that he [the relative] had likely been the intended target. The relative had been imprisoned in Long Kesh and lived on Longlands Road, Newtownabbey. The relative added: "I appeared in court three times and each time my address was published in newspapers as Longlands Park, where he [the cousin] lived".
- 15 November: the UDA shot dead a Catholic civilian at his home on Sintonville Avenue, Belfast.
- 20 November: the UDA's Londonderry Brigade claimed responsibility for bombing a car showroom in Bridgend, County Donegal, Republic of Ireland. It claimed it was retaliation for the IRA's bombing campaign.
- 20 November: a taxi driver died three weeks after being shot by his UDA passenger on Forthriver Road, Belfast. The gunman believed the driver was a Catholic.
- 21 November: the UDA shot dead a Catholic civilian in Finvoy, County Antrim.
- 21 November: the UDA, secretly working in coordination with the British Army and RUC Special Branch, bombed Aghalane Bridge connecting County Fermanagh and County Cavan. A leading UDA member and Ulster Unionist Party councillor on Fermanagh District Council organised the attack.
- 22 November: the UDA shot dead a Catholic civilian outside his home near Castledawson, County Londonderry.
- 30 November: the UDA shot dead a Catholic civilian outside Mater Hospital on Crumlin Road, Belfast. Two UDA men got into a taxi with him on Clifton Street. When they reached the hospital one said he was ill and the taxi stopped. They got out, walked to the front of the car and opened fire. The driver was wounded in the attack.
- 2 December: a Catholic civilian, Patrick Benstead (aged 23), was found shot dead in an entry off Crossley Street, Belfast. The man – described in contemporary reports as "intellectually disabled" – had been kidnapped, tortured and shot in the head by members of the UDA. A cross had been burnt into his back and the letters "IRA" carved into his skin.
- 2 December: --the UDA shot dead a Protestant civilian (Sandra Meli) at her home on Flora Street, East Belfast. Gunmen opened fire through her kitchen window. It is believed her Catholic husband was the intended target.
- 7 December: the UDA shot dead one of its own members in the Village area of south Belfast in an internal dispute.
- 20 December: the UDA killed a Catholic civilian in a drive-by shooting on Newtownards Road, Belfast. He was waiting for a lift to the Royal Naval Aircraft Yard, where he worked.
- 20 December: four Catholic civilians (McGinley, Michael McGinley, Charles McCafferty, Bernard Kelly and Francis McCarron) and one Protestant civilian (Charles Moore) were killed in a gun attack on the Top of the Hill Bar at Strabane Old Road, Derry. It is believed the UDA was responsible. See: Top of the Hill bar shooting

=== 1973 ===
- 1 January: the UDA shot dead two Catholic civilians and dumped their bodies in a ditch near Burnfoot, County Donegal, Republic of Ireland.
- 2 January: UDA volunteers opened fire on a carload of Catholic civilians arriving for work at the Rolls-Royce factory in Dundonald, County Down One person was killed and two others wounded.
- 11 January: A Catholic church was bombed by Loyalists outside Ballymena. The Church was ruined by a 10lb bomb. The police believed the UDA was behind the attack.
- 29 January: the UDA shot dead a Catholic civilian at his workplace, a petrol station on Kennedy Way, Belfast.
- 29 January: the UDA killed a 15-year-old Catholic civilian, Peter Watterson, in a drive-by shooting at the Falls Road/Donegall Road junction, Belfast.
- 29 January: the PIRA shot dead UDA volunteer Francis "Hatchet" Smith in west Belfast. He was held responsible for the death of Peter Watterson earlier that same day.
- 31 January: a 14-year-old Catholic boy, was found shot dead at Giant's Ring, Belfast; the UDA is believed to have kidnapped him.
- 31 January: a 17-year-old Catholic civilian was found shot dead beside the M1 motorway near Donegall Road, Belfast. The UDA was believed responsible.
- 1 February: UDA volunteers threw a grenade into a bus on Kingsway Park, Belfast. It killed the bus driver, a Catholic civilian. This was the first attack in which the name "Ulster Freedom Fighters" (UFF) was used to claim responsibility.
- 2 February: A Catholic civilian was found hooded and shot dead in a car on Maurice Street, Belfast. It is believed the UDA was responsible.
- 2 February: the PIRA shot dead a UDA volunteer on Oldpark Road, Belfast.
- 3 February: New Lodge Six shooting.
- 7 February: the UDA (as part of the United Loyalist Council) held a one-day strike to "re-establish some sort of Protestant or loyalist control over the affairs of the province". Loyalist paramilitaries forcibly tried to stop many people going to work and to close any businesses that had opened. There were eight bombings and thirty-five acts of arson. In Belfast, the UDA shot dead a fireman fighting a blaze, while two UDA members were shot dead (one by the PIRA and one by the British Army).
- 17 February: a Catholic civilian was found dead in his car on Watt Street, Belfast. He had been shot by the UDA.
- 19 February: St Brigid's Catholic Church in Derryvolgie Avenue came under attack during the night. A number of shots were fired at the church and the remaining 5 people inside it. No one was injured in the attack. It is believed the UDA did the shooting.
- 5 March: a UDA volunteer died when the bomb he was handling exploded prematurely on Woodstock Road, Belfast.
- 8 March: a Catholic civilian was found shot dead in a car on Summer Street, Belfast. The UDA was believed responsible.
- 17 March: a UDA volunteer died when the car bomb he was transporting exploded prematurely as he parked outside Kirk's Bar, Cloughfin, County Donegal.
- 20 March: the UDA killed a Catholic civilian and wounded another in a drive-by shooting on Grosvenor Road, Belfast. Locals claimed a British Army Saracen APC smashed through a nationalist barricade minutes before the shooting, allowing the gunmen's car to drive through. They accused the British Army of "facilitating Protestant extremist murder gangs". The victims had apparently gathered after hearing the barricade being smashed.
- 23 March: the UDA shot dead a Catholic civilian and wounded another in a drive-by shooting on a house at Durham Street, Belfast.
- 2 May: the UDA shot dead a Catholic civilian in a disused quarry off Ballyduff Road, Newtownabbey.
- 19 May: the UDA shot dead a Catholic civilian as he walked along Adela Street, Belfast.
- 25 May: the UDA shot dead a Catholic civilian at Giant's Ring, Belfast.
- 9 June: the UFF claimed responsibility for throwing a bomb into the Avenue Bar, Belfast. Six people were wounded.
- 10 June: the UDA shot dead a Catholic civilian in the Deerpark Road area of Belfast. A Protestant bus driver was also killed when his bus was caught in crossfire between the UDA and British Army.
- 15 June: the UDA shot dead one of its own volunteers at Ravenswood Park, Belfast in an internal dispute.
- 16 June: a Catholic civilian was found shot dead on Dunmurry Lane, Belfast. The UFF claimed responsibility.
- 17 June: a Catholic civilian was found shot dead at Corr's Corner, Newtownabbey. The UFF claimed responsibility.
- 18 June: the UFF claimed responsibility for throwing a bomb into the Meeting of the Waters pub on Manor Street, Belfast. One man was seriously wounded.
- 25 June: a Protestant civilian was found shot dead at his home on Nore Street, Belfast. The UFF claimed responsibility and claimed the man had been an informer.
- 26 June: SDLP politician Paddy Wilson, a Catholic, and his secretary, Irene Andrews, a Protestant, were found stabbed to death in a quarry on Hightown Road near Belfast. The UFF claimed responsibility. A UFF leader, John White, confessed to the murders in 1978.
- 29 June: the UDA shot dead a Protestant cross-community social worker at his home on Eglantine Avenue, Belfast.
- 5 July: the UFF claimed responsibility for shooting dead a Catholic civilian at his workplace on Pembroke Street, Belfast.
- 14 July: the UFF claimed responsibility for exploding a 200 lb car bomb outside a pub in central Belfast. Five people were hurt.
- 17 July: the UDA exploded a car bomb at the Silver Eel Bar, Aghalee Road, Crumlin, killing a Catholic civilian.
- 20 July: the UFF claimed responsibility for bombing three Catholic-owned pubs in Belfast: Bus Bar, Mooney's Bar, and College Arms. Four people were hurt and six buses in a neighbouring depot were destroyed.
- 10 August: UDA volunteers in a hijacked taxi shot dead a Catholic civilian as he walked along Kennedy Way, Belfast. His father died of a heart attack when he learned of his son's death.
- 22 August: Two bombs caused severe damage to Catholic churches. The first, near Ballymena at Braid Chapel, left the building in ruins. The second went off two hours later at a church in Crebilly but caused only minor damage, although a number of near by houses were also damaged.
- 23 August: a Catholic civilian was found shot dead in a car at Mayobridge, County Down. The UFF claimed responsibility.
- 5 September: The UFF claimed responsibility for a no-warning car bombing on Springfield Road, Belfast. The bomb was spotted and the area evacuated. A bakery and 15 houses were damaged.
- 11 September: The UFF claimed responsibility for a no-warning bomb which badly damaged a Catholic church at Holywood Road in East Belfast.
- 16 September: Tommy Herron, vice-chairman of the UDA, was shot dead and left in a ditch in Drumbo, near Lisburn.
- 17–18 September: the UFF claimed responsibility for bombing four Catholic schools in Belfast over a 24-hour period. Shortly afterward, British soldiers were sent to guard all Catholic schools in Belfast.
- 4 October: the UFF claimed responsibility for a grenade attack on a Catholic-owned pub near Banbridge. Six people were hurt.
- 22 October: the UDA detonated a bomb at Wilson's Bar, Upper Newtownards Road, Belfast. A Protestant civilian, who was walking by, was killed when part of the building collapsed.
- 7 November: the UDA shot dead a Catholic civilian outside his workplace on Springfield Road, Belfast. Elsewhere in Belfast, the UFF claimed responsibility for shooting a man as he sat in the cab of his lorry.
- 12 November: the UFF claimed responsibility for detonating six car bombs in Belfast in the space of two hours. The bombs targeted four pubs, a petrol station and the former SDLP headquarters. Thirteen people were injured and many buildings were badly damaged.
- 8 December: the UDA shot dead a Catholic civilian inside his shop on Stranmillis Road, Belfast.
- 26 December: a UDA member was beaten to death by other loyalists in the Maze Prison as an alleged informer.
- 29 December: UDA and UVF snipers shot dead a Catholic RUC officer, Michael Logue (aged 21) on Forthriver Road, Belfast. They had robbed a supermarket to lure his police patrol to the scene. Earlier, the security forces had shot dead a UVF member and the attack was thought to have been a retaliation for that.

=== 1974 ===
- 2 January: a bomb was thrown into a Roman Catholic parochial house in Mullavilly, County Armagh. The blast wrecked a third of the building and set fire to the remainder. Two priests were inside at the time. The UFF claimed responsibility.
- 31 January: the UFF claimed responsibility for shooting dead two Catholic civilians at a building site in Newtownabbey, County Antrim.
- 9 February: the UFF claimed responsibility for shooting dead two Catholic civilians as they left O'Kane's Bar on Grosvenor Road, Belfast.
- 11 February: the UFF claimed responsibility for shooting dead two Catholic civilians at their workplace in Newtownabbey, County Antrim.
- 12 February: the UDA shot dead a Catholic civilian at his workplace on Lisburn Road, Belfast.
- 17 February: the British Army shot dead two UDA volunteers during a riot on Belvoir Street, Belfast.
- 21 February: the UFF claimed responsibility for detonating a bomb at Spa Inn on Spamount Street, Belfast. A Catholic civilian was killed.
- 14 March: a high-ranking UDA volunteer, James Redmond, was badly injured when a bomb exploded under his car outside his Portadown home. The blast shattered nearby windows.
- 20 March: the UFF claimed responsibility for a drive-by shooting attack on a Catholic schoolteacher in Cookstown.
- 21 March: UDA volunteers opened fire on a lorry carrying about twenty workmen at Duncrue Street, Belfast. One Catholic civilian was killed and five wounded. It was regarded as an indiscriminate sectarian attack.
- 8 May: the UDA shot dead a Catholic civilian at his home on Kingsmoss Road, Newtownabbey.

8 May: the UDA issued a statement opposing the Sunningdale Agreement and supporting the United Ulster Unionist Council (UUUC).
15 May: the Ulster Workers' Council strike began in protest at the Sunningdale Agreement. For the next fourteen days, loyalist paramilitaries forcibly tried to stop many people going to work and to close any businesses that had opened.

- 16 May: a UDA volunteer shot dead a female Catholic civilian at the Edlingham Street/Stratheden Street junction, Belfast. She had stopped to talk to a friend. A witness said the gunman emerged from the loyalist Tiger Bay area. There had been sporadic trouble in the area that day and locals complained that the British Army had done little to stop UDA activity nearby.

17 May: in response to the Dublin and Monaghan bombings carried out by the Ulster Volunteer Force (UVF), the UDA's press secretary, Sammy Smyth (later assassinated by the PIRA) said "I am very happy about the bombings in Dublin. There is a war with the [Republic of Ireland] and now we are laughing at them". Thirty-three civilians were killed and 300 wounded in the attacks.

- 18 May: a UDA volunteer shot dead a UVF volunteer during a fight in North Star Bar on North Queen Street, Belfast.
- 20 May: the UDA shot dead a Catholic civilian and dumped his body by the roadside on Milltown Road, Belfast.
- 24 May: two Catholic civilians were shot dead in their pub, The Wayside Halt, near Ballymena. This was part of a joint UDA/UVF attack to ensure businesses remained shut during the Ulster Workers’ Council (UWC) strike.

28 May: The Ulster Workers' Council strike ended.

- 3 June: a civilian was found shot dead in a quarry on Hightown Road, between Belfast and Newtownabbey. Although most of his relatives were Catholic, he self-identified as Protestant. It is believed the UDA were responsible.
- 9 June: a Catholic child was killed when a UDA/UFF bomb exploded prematurely at Ballymacaward Kennel Club, Hannahstown, County Antrim.
- 14 June: the UFF claimed responsibility for shooting dead a Catholic civilian on Divis Street, Belfast.
- 12 July: the PIRA shot dead a UDA volunteer on Glenrosa Street, Belfast.
- 24 July: the UFF claimed responsibility for kidnapping and shooting dead Independent Nationalist politician Patrick Kelly near Trillick. His body was found on 10 August in Lough Eyes, County Fermanagh.
- 24 July: a female UDA unit beat a Protestant civilian, Ann Ogilby, to death in an abandoned building on Hunter Street, Belfast, then dumped her body on Stockman's Lane. It was found on 29 July. The killing was the result of a personal dispute between the women.

1 August: UDA volunteers and SDLP representatives held a meeting.

- 8 August: the UDA shot dead one of its own volunteers on Seaview Drive, Belfast in an internal dispute.
- 14 August: the UDA shot dead a Catholic civilian on North Queen Street, Belfast.
- 29 September: the UDA stabbed to death a Catholic civilian on Lecale Street, Belfast.
- 8 October: the UFF claimed responsibility for shooting two Catholic workmen at a building site in Belfast in purported retaliation for the Guildford pub bombings.
- 12 October: the UDA shot dead a Catholic civilian and wounded another civilian as they walked along Ellis Street in Carrickfergus.
- 22 October: a Catholic civilian was killed and another badly wounded by a booby-trap bomb at a betting shop on Marquis Street, Belfast. The bomb had been hidden in a radio and left at the shop by a UDA member.
- 4 November: the UDA shot dead a Catholic civilian outside the University Road (Belfast) pub where he worked as a security guard.
- 10 November: the UDA shot dead a Catholic civilian at his home on Clovelly Street, Belfast.
- 12 November: the UDA killed a Catholic civilian in a drive-by shooting on Ardmore Road, Derry.
- 22 November: the UDA shot dead a Catholic civilian at her workplace on Springfield Road, Belfast.
- 23 November: the UDA shot dead two civilians, a Catholic and a Protestant, at Arkle Taxi Depot, Clifton Street, Belfast.
- 25 November: the UDA shot dead a Protestant civilian outside Ewart's Mill, Belfast, whom they mistook for a Catholic.
- 25 November: the UDA shot dead a Catholic civilian as he sat in a car on Portaferry Road, Newtownards.
- 4 December: the UDA shot a Protestant civilian during an attempted robbery of his shop on Upper Glenfarne Street, Belfast. He died on 6 December.
- 21 December: a Catholic civilian was found shot and strangled-to-death on Upper Mealough Road, Carryduff. A court was told he was killed by two UDA workmates after drinking with them in Belfast.
- 24 December: a Catholic civilian died two months after being shot by the UDA at City Hospital, Belfast.

=== 1975 ===
- 29 January: the UDA shot dead a Catholic civilian at United Paper Merchants on Downshire Place, Belfast.
- 9 February: the UDA opened fire on Catholic civilians leaving St Brigid's church on Derryvolgie Avenue, Belfast; two parishioners were killed.
- 25 February: the UDA shot dead a Catholic civilian at his workplace, Fisher Metal Fabrications, on Boucher Road, Belfast. He was singled-out and made to kneel before being shot in the head. The gunmen stole a small sum of money.
- 13 March: a Catholic civilian died three weeks after being shot by the UDA in Parke's grocery shop on North Queen Street, Belfast.
- 15 March: the UVF shot dead two UDA members in Alexandra Bar, Belfast during a feud between the two groups.
- 3 April: republicans shot dead a UDA volunteer at his home on Highfield Drive, Belfast.
- 5 April: republicans killed a UDA volunteer and four Protestant civilians in a bomb attack at the Mountainview Tavern, Shankill Road, Belfast.
- 6 April: republicans shot a UDA volunteer dead on Alliance Road, Belfast.
- 6 April: a 60-year-old woman was hospitalised after a bomb was thrown into the Catholic Ex-Serviceman's Club in the Short Strand area of Belfast. The attack was claimed by "the young militant UDA".
- 28 April: the UDA shot dead a Protestant civilian working on the railway line near Donegall Road, Belfast; a Catholic workmate was the intended target.
- 2 May: the PIRA shot a UDA volunteer dead at his workplace, Ardoyne Bus Depot, Ardoyne Road, Belfast.
- 13 June: a 3-year-old girl was killed and her father (a Catholic civilian) badly wounded by a UDA booby-trap bomb in Belfast. They were following their normal morning routine, with the man taking his daughter in the family car to a nearby nursery school. The bomb had been wired to the car on Sunnyside Park and exploded as the girl got inside.
- 14 June: the UDA shot dead a Catholic civilian in a drive-by shooting on New Lodge Road, Belfast.
- 20 June: the UDA shot dead a Catholic civilian on Fraser Street, Belfast.
- 13 July: the UVF shot dead a UDA volunteer in Taughmonagh, Belfast. Part of a feud between the two loyalist groups.
- 21 July: the UVF ambushed the Miami Showband on the A1 road at Buskhill in County Down, Northern Ireland. Five people were killed, including three members of the band.
- 12 August: the UDA shot dead a Protestant civilian at his workplace off Albertbridge Road, Belfast. He was apparently wrongly thought to have been an IRA member.
- 21 August: the UDA shot dead a Catholic civilian on Brougham Street in Belfast as he walked to work.
- 30 August: the UFF claimed responsibility for killing two Catholic civilians in a gun and grenade attack on the Harp Bar, Belfast.
- 1 September: two UDA volunteers were found buried in field near Whitehead, County Antrim. It is believed they had been shot by the UVF as part of a feud between the two loyalist groups.

2 September: the UDA voiced its support, at a conference in the United States, for an independent Northern Ireland.

- 8 September: the PIRA shot dead a UDA volunteer at the corner of Alfred and Russell streets, Belfast.
- 18 September: the UDA shot dead a Catholic civilian in his newsagent's shop at Greenway, Belfast.
- 10 October: the PIRA shot a UDA volunteer dead as he walked along Haywood Avenue, near his home in Belfast.
- 29 November: an Irish civilian airport worker was killed when a UDA bomb exploded in a bathroom in Dublin Airport.
- 20 December: a bomb exploded at Biddy Mulligan's pub in Kilburn, London, injuring five people. The pub was said to have been frequented by Irish republican sympathizers. The UDA claimed one of its "associate units" carried out the attack.
- 21 December: the UDA shot dead a Catholic civilian (Christine Hughes, aged 43) after breaking into her home at Mountainview Parade, off Crumlin Road, Belfast. She was an active member of the reconciliation group Women Together.

=== 1976 ===
- 22 January: the UDA shot dead a Catholic civilian at his home at Thirlmere Gardens, Belfast.
- 24 January: the UDA shot dead a Catholic civilian as he walked along Clifton Street, Belfast. The inquest was told he was shot after "a perfectly chance encounter" outside the Royal Air Force club.
- 25 January: the UDA bombed the Ancient Order of Hibernians social club on Conway Street, Lisburn, killing two Catholic civilians.
- 31 January: UDA members discovered a woman (Imelda Maxwell) who had been invited to their social club in Sandy Row was Catholic. They attempted to beat her to death with bricks and clubs, leaving her "unrecognisable" to ambulance staff from the Royal Victoria Hospital where she worked. Maxwell suffered permanent brain damage and was "no longer able to lead an independent existence".
- 15 February: the UDA shot dead three civilians (two Catholics and one Protestant) at a house on Wolfhill Drive, Belfast.
- 17 February: the UFF claimed responsibility for killing a Catholic civilian in a gun attack on McLaughlin's Bar in Claudy, County Londonderry.
- 5 March: the UDA shot dead one of its own volunteers on Argyle Street, Belfast, in an internal dispute.
- 10 March: the PIRA assassinated Sammy Smyth (former UDA spokesman) on Alliance Avenue, Belfast.
- 13 March: the UDA beat a UVF volunteer to death on Aberdeen Street, Belfast. Part of a feud between the two loyalist groups.
- 18 March: the UDA stabbed a Catholic civilian to death outside the Cregagh Inn on Cregagh Road, Belfast.
- 13 May: the UFF claimed responsibility for shooting dead a Protestant civilian (as a purported informer) on Woodstock Road, Belfast.
- 28 May: the UDA detonated a no-warning bomb in the Club Bar on University Street, Belfast. Two civilians, one Catholic and one Protestant, were killed. The pub attracted both Catholics and Protestants and had been attacked by loyalists a number of times.
- 30 May: a Catholic civilian was found shot dead in his milk float on Springhill Avenue, Belfast. He was shot from close range and his vehicle had crashed into a fence. He was killed by UDA members who picked him out coming from the depot and followed him around the streets. His colleagues went on strike in protest.
- 2 June: the PIRA shot a UDA volunteer dead at his home on Cambrai Street, Belfast.
- 4 June: the UDA shot dead a Protestant civilian (mistaken for a Catholic) on Waterproof Street, Belfast.
- 5 June: the UDA shot dead Sinn Féin activist Colm Mulgrew at Camberwell Terrace, Belfast.
- 5 June: the UDA carried out a drive-by shooting at the Crumlin Star Bar in Brompton Park, Belfast; a Catholic civilian died of his wounds two days later. An RUC detective said it was a random sectarian attack.
- 11 June: the RUC shot dead a UDA volunteer as he traveled in a stolen car in Newtownabbey, County Antrim.
- 17 June: the UDA shot dead two Catholic civilians on board a bus on Crumlin Road, Belfast.
- 19 June: the PIRA shot dead a UDA volunteer at his home in Dunmurry.
- 3 July: the UFF claimed responsibility for bombing four hotels in the Republic of Ireland. There were explosions in Dublin, Rosslare, Limerick and Killarney but no fatalities. On 10 July it bombed the Salthill Hotel in Galway, also without fatalities.
- 7 July: the UDA shot a Catholic civilian dead at his shop on Upper Newtownards Road, Belfast.
- 9 July: the UFF claimed responsibility for shooting dead two Catholic civilians at their home on Longlands Road, Newtownabbey.
- 13 July: the UDA shot dead an Official IRA (OIRA) volunteer outside the Boundary Bar, Shore Road, Belfast. His death notice in the Irish Times reported that he was on vigilante duty and was believed to have been armed. He was also a Workers' Party member.
- 1 August: a Protestant civilian who had been living with a Catholic family on Annalee Street, Belfast, was shot dead by the UDA.
- 18 August: the UDA shot a UVF volunteer dead on Flush Road, Belfast as part of a feud between the two groups.
- 27 August: UDA members petrol-bombed the home of a young Catholic family on Hillman Street, Belfast. A Catholic couple and their ten-month-old baby were killed.
- 31 August: a Catholic civilian was found dead on Carlow Street, Belfast. He had been tied-up with wire, badly beaten and then shot in the head. Police believed UDA members had taken him from a pub and killed him when they found he was a Catholic. He died two days later, on 2 September 1976.
- 4 September: the "West Tyrone Battalion" of the UDA claimed responsibility for an attack on a pub in Castlefin, County Donegal. A UDA spokesman claimed the pub was a meeting place for IRA members and that they had set fire to the building with a new homemade flamethrower. The UDA gang responsible also robbed customers in the bar.
- 10 September: the UDA shot a Catholic civilian on Donard Drive, Lisburn. He was cycling to work when he was shot in the back with a shotgun. He died on 20 September 1976. A detective said the motive was sectarian.
- 11 September: the UDA shot dead one of its own members on Disraeli Street, Belfast in an internal dispute.
- 17 September: the UDA shot dead a Catholic civilian at his home on Cooldarragh Park, Belfast.
- 24 September: the UDA shot dead a 17 year old Catholic civilian in her home on Oldpark Avenue, Belfast; she had been babysitting three children at the time. An RUC detective said her home was the first Catholic home the gunmen came across and that the motive was sectarian.
- 24 September: UDA members robbed a grocery shop on Manor Street, Belfast. They shot a 15-year-old Catholic civilian who worked there and she died on 11 October 1976. Another woman, who was active in the Peace Movement, was badly wounded and lost an eye as a result.
- 24 September: republicans shot two men dead: a UDA volunteer and a Protestant civilian, at the Cavehill Inn, Cavehill Road, Belfast.
- 3 October: the UFF claimed responsibility for shooting dead a Catholic civilian at his home on Knockwellan Park, Derry.
- 6 October: the UDA killed two Catholic civilians at their home on Victoria Gardens, Belfast. The men stabbed the woman 36 times and then shot her son-in-law. The inquest was told that the killings might have been revenge for the shooting of two Protestant men (one a UDA volunteer) in a nearby pub on 24 September 1976.
- 13 October: the UDA opened fire outside a nationalist pub in Free Derry, killing 2 people, and injuring wounding a PIRA volunteer and a number of civilians.
- 28 October: several UDA and UVF volunteers shot dead former Sinn Féin vice-president Máire Drumm in the Mater Hospital, Crumlin Road, Belfast. She had retired a short time before her killing and had been in the hospital for an operation. The gunmen dressed as doctors. A UVF volunteer (formerly a British Army soldier), who worked as a security guard at the hospital, was among a number of men jailed.
- 4 November: a Catholic civilian was found shot dead on the bank of the Forth River in Glencairn, Belfast. An RUC detective said it was a sectarian killing carried out by the UDA.
- 13 November: the UDA kidnapped a Catholic civilian from Cliftonville Road and shot him dead in a random sectarian killing.
- 15 November: the UFF claimed responsibility for shooting a Catholic civilian at his home in Greysteel, County Londonderry. He died ten days later, on 25 November.
- 22 November: the UFF claimed responsibility for shooting a Catholic civilian dead at the Happy Landing Bar in Eglinton, County Londonderry.
- 30 November: the UDA shot a Catholic civilian dead at her home on Silverstream Road, Belfast.
- 20 December: the UVF killed a UDA volunteer on Forthriver Road, Belfast as part of a feud between the two groups.

=== 1977 ===
- 21 January: the UFF claimed responsibility for the shooting death of Sinn Féin activist Michael McHugh at his home in Corgary, County Tyrone.
- 22 January: a Catholic civilian (from County Mayo, Republic of Ireland) and a Protestant civilian (apparently mistaken for Catholic) were found shot dead in a burning car on Downing Street, Belfast.
- 31 January: the UVF beat to death a UDA member on Adela Street, Belfast as part of a feud between the two groups.
- 19 February: the UDA shot a Catholic civilian dead at his home on Clifton Crescent, Belfast.
- 17 March: the UDA shot dead a Catholic civilian as he drove along Cambrai Street, Belfast.

3 May: the UUAC strike began. Loyalist paramilitaries forcibly tried to stop many people going to work and to close any businesses that had opened.

- 8 May: a Protestant civilian was found shot dead on wasteground at Forthriver Road, Belfast. He had also been robbed. Detectives said he may have been mistaken for someone from the Republic, due to his Fermanagh accent.
- 10 May: the UDA shot dead a bus driver on Crumlin Road, Belfast for working during the strike.
- 10 May: two UDA volunteers were killed in a premature bomb explosion at Seagoe Gardens, Newtownabbey.

13 May: the UUAC strike ended. The Royal Ulster Constabulary (RUC) reported that 3 people had been killed, 41 RUC officers injured, and 115 people charged with offences committed during the strike.

- 23 May: UDA members undertook an armed robbery of Ewart's Bowling Club on Somerdale Park, Belfast. A Protestant civilian was shot and died of his wounds on 29 May 1977.
- 15 July: the UDA shot dead one of its own members on Old Glencairn Road, Belfast, in an internal dispute.
- 21 September: a Protestant civilian was found beaten to death in a quarry near Moneymore. He was kidnapped on 14 January 1977 after witnessing a UDA robbery.

=== 1978 ===
- 27 May: the UDA shot dead a Catholic civilian on Cavehill Road, Belfast.

=== 1979 ===
- 22 April: a Catholic civilian was found beaten to death in the River Bann at Seagoe near Portadown. He was a civil servant and had been kidnapped a month earlier. It is thought the UDA was responsible.
- 25 April: the UDA shot dead a PIRA volunteer at his home on Rosevale Street, Belfast.
- 26 May: a UDA volunteer was shot by loyalists in the Royal Bar, Shankill Road, Belfast. He died of his wounds on 29 May.
- 9 June: the UDA shot an OIRA volunteer dead in a shop on Castle Street, Belfast.
- 3 September: the UFF claimed responsibility for the shooting death of a Catholic civilian at his home on Bawnmore Grove, Belfast.
- 5 September: loyalist gunmen boarded a bus in the Oldpark, North Belfast, and shot a male Catholic passenger, seriously wounding him. The UFF claimed responsibility.
- 8 November: the UDA shot dead two Catholic civilians as they were walking along Thompson Street in the Short Strand area of Belfast.
- 3 December: the UFF claimed responsibility for shooting dead a Catholic civilian at his home on Brooke Crescent, Belfast.

== 1980s ==
=== 1980 ===
- 4 January: the UDA beat a Catholic civilian to death inside a derelict garage on Berlin Street, Belfast.
- 15 April: a UDA volunteer died when his bomb prematurely exploded in Connsbrook Filling Station, Belfast.
- 4 June: the UDA shot dead Protestant Irish Independence Party (IIP) member John Turnley in Carnlough, County Antrim.
- 13 June: a UDA volunteer died when his bomb prematurely exploded at a community centre on Highfield Drive, Belfast.
- 24 August: the UDA shot dead Irish Republican Socialist Party (IRSP) member Rodney McCormick in Larne, County Antrim.
- 15 October: the UFF claimed responsibility for shooting dead Ronnie Bunting (a Protestant) and Noel Lyttle (a Catholic) in a house in Downfine Gardens, Belfast. Both were Irish National Liberation Army and IRSP volunteers. Bunting's wife, Suzanne, was wounded but recovered.
- 12–17 December: 6 UDA prisoners went on hunger strike in the Maze Prison, demanding to be segregated from republican prisoners.

=== 1981 ===
- 16 January: the UDA were believed to be responsible for shooting prominent republican Bernadette Devlin McAliskey (a former MP) and her husband, Michael, at their home near Moy, County Tyrone. Both were shot numerous times but survived.
- 27 March: the UDA shot dead a Catholic civilian on Berwick Road, Belfast.
- 16 May: the UFF claimed responsibility for shooting dead a Catholic civilian at his home on Abbeydale Parade, Belfast.
- 26 May: the RUC raided UDA headquarters in Belfast and found a number of illegal weapons. At this time the UDA was still a legal organisation.
- 2 June: the UDA founded the Ulster Democratic Party (UDP).
- 9 August: the UFF claimed responsibility for shooting dead a Catholic civilian on Alliance Avenue, Belfast.
- 8 October: the UFF claimed responsibility for the shooting death of an independent republican councillor, Larry Kennedy, who, along with another man, was shot in the foyer of the Shamrock Social Club, Belfast.
- 12 October: the UFF claimed responsibility for shooting dead a Catholic civilian at his home on Deerpark Road, Belfast. It also claimed responsibility for bombing Christ the King Roman Catholic church in Limavady. Most of the building was destroyed but there were no injuries.
- 16 October: the INLA shot dead a UDA volunteer on Denmark Street, Belfast.
- 19 October: the RUC shot dead a UDA volunteer driving a stolen car at the junction of the Ballygomartin and Woodvale roads, Belfast.
- 4 November: the UFF claimed responsibility for the shooting death of a UDA volunteer on Silvio Street, Belfast. It claimed the man was an informer.
- 25 November: the UFF claimed responsibility for firing shots into the Dublin offices of An Phoblacht.

=== 1982 ===
- 23 January: the UDA shot dead two of its own volunteers at their home at Rosebery Gardens, Belfast in an internal dispute.
- 27 March: a UDA volunteer was shot dead by loyalists in the King Richard Tavern, Castlereagh Road, Belfast.
- 14 April: the RUC raided the UDA headquarters and again found weapons. Four UDA volunteers were arrested.
- 16 April: James Prior, then Secretary of State for Northern Ireland, said that he had no plans to make the UDA illegal.
- 5 May: the UDA stabbed and shot dead a Protestant civilian during a robbery at her post office in Killinchy, County Down.
- 26 August: the UFF claimed responsibility for shooting dead a Catholic civilian on Mountainhill Road, Belfast.

=== 1983 ===
- 8 January: the UDA shot dead one of its own volunteers on Woodvale Road, Belfast in an internal dispute.

=== 1984 ===
- 14 March: the UFF claimed responsibility for shooting and wounding four Sinn Féin members (including SF president Gerry Adams) as they travelled by car through Belfast.
- 10 August: a UDA volunteer was killed while trying to escape from Maze Prison.
- 16 November: the UFF claimed responsibility for shooting dead a civilian Sinn Féin member, Patrick Brady, on Boucher Road, Belfast.

=== 1985 ===
- 7 April: the UFF claimed responsibility for shooting dead a Catholic civilian in Enniskillen, County Fermanagh.
- 27 November: the UFF claimed responsibility for shooting and badly wounding a Sinn Féin member outside his home in Belfast.
- 8 November: the UFF claimed responsibility for shooting dead a Catholic civilian as he sat in a car outside his workplace on Drumbeg Drive, Lisburn.

=== 1986 ===
- 7 August: the UFF announced it was extending its list of "legitimate targets".
- 26 August: the UFF claimed responsibility for shooting dead a Catholic civilian at his home on Rodney Drive, Belfast.
- 16 October: the UFF claimed responsibility for shooting dead two Catholic civilians at their home in Ballynahinch, County Down.
- 18 October: the UDA shot dead one of its own volunteers in the Kimberly Inn on Kimberly Street, Belfast. Internal dispute.
- 8 November: the UFF claimed responsibility for planting four incendiary devices in the centre of Dublin. Two exploded in bins on O'Connell Street and the other two, also in bins, were defused.
- 6 December: a Catholic civilian was badly beaten by UDA volunteers in Tavern Bar on Bridge Street, Lisburn. He died on 9 December 1986.

=== 1987 ===
- 23 May: the UFF claimed responsibility for shooting dead a Catholic civilian while he delivered bread near Drumquin, County Tyrone.
- 3 July: the UFF claimed responsibility for shooting dead a Catholic civilian and dumped his body in a disused quarry off Upper Crumlin Road, Belfast. He was a former internee.
- 7 July: the PIRA shot a UDA volunteer dead in a snooker hall on Ligoniel Road, Belfast.
- 17 July: the UFF claimed responsibility for shooting two Catholic civilians in Belfast. One was shot at his workplace on Lord Street and died on 16 March 1988. Another was shot in his home at Roden Square.
- 23 August: the UFF claimed responsibility for shooting dead a Catholic civilian as he drove his car along Netherlands Park, Belfast.
- 9 September: the UFF claimed responsibility for shooting dead a Catholic civilian at his home on Forfar Street, Belfast.
- 20 September: the UFF claimed responsibility for shooting dead a Catholic civilian as he sat in his car on Prestwick Park, Belfast.
- 6 October: the UFF claimed responsibility for shooting dead a former UDA volunteer at his home on Alliance Parade, Belfast.
- 9 October: the UFF claimed responsibility for shooting dead a Catholic former internee at the man's home, Whitecliff Parade, Belfast.
- 9 November: the UDA shot dead a Protestant civilian at his workplace on Highview Crescent, Belfast. They believed he was a Catholic.
- 11 November: loyalist gunmen shot a Catholic civilian at his cafe Crumlin Road, Ardoyne, Belfast. He died five days later. No group claimed responsibility.
- 22 December: John McMichael, deputy leader of the UDA, was assassinated by a booby-trap bomb attached to his car by the PIRA outside his home, Hilden Court, Lisburn.

=== 1988 ===
- 16 January: the UDA shot dead an off-duty Protestant Ulster Defence Regiment soldier on Park Road, Belfast. He was evidently mistaken for a Catholic.
- 25 January: the UFF claimed responsibility for shooting dead a Catholic civilian at his workplace in Dundrum, County Down.
- 15 March: the UFF claimed responsibility for shooting dead a Catholic civilian at his workplace on Annadale Embankment, Belfast.
- 16 March: Milltown Cemetery attack – at the funeral of three PIRA members, UDA member Michael Stone attacked the mourners with two handguns and grenades. Two civilians and a PIRA volunteer were killed, and more than sixty other people were wounded.
- 10 May: the UFF claimed responsibility for shooting dead a Catholic civilian at his home on Newington Street, Belfast.
- 6 July: the UFF claimed responsibility for shooting dead a Catholic civilian as he waited for a lift to work in Dromore, County Down.
- 7 September: the Irish People's Liberation Organisation (IPLO) shot dead a UDA volunteer on Century Street, Belfast.
- 23 September: the UFF claimed responsibility for shooting dead a Catholic civilian at his home on Waterville Street, Belfast.
- 15 October: as part of an internal dispute, the UFF claimed responsibility for shooting dead leading UDA member James Craig. One civilian was killed and four wounded in the attack at The Castle Inn, Beersbridge Road, Belfast.

=== 1989 ===
- 25 January: the UFF claimed responsibility for shooting dead a Protestant civilian at his workplace on Kingsmore Link Road, Lisburn. They believed he was a Catholic.
- 12 February: the UFF claimed responsibility for shooting dead a solicitor Pat Finucane at his home Fortwilliam Drive, Belfast. He had represented a number of republicans in high-profile cases.
- 20 February: the UFF claimed responsibility for shooting dead a Catholic civilian at his workplace in Donaghcloney, County Down.
- 24 June: the UFF claimed responsibility for shooting dead a Catholic civilian at his home on Donard Drive, Lisburn.
- 25 August: the UFF claimed responsibility for shooting dead a Catholic civilian, Loughlin Maginn, at his home in Lissize near Rathfriland, County Down. Before his death, he said he had been repeatedly threatened by RUC officers and UDR soldiers. After the killing, the UFF showed a BBC reporter pictures of alleged IRA suspects acquired from the security forces. Maginn's picture was included on the montage. In March 1992, two UDR soldiers and another man were convicted of murdering Maginn.

== 1990s ==
=== 1990 ===
- 2 January: Harry Dickey, a member of the UDA and the Ulster Democratic Party (UDP), was killed by a PIRA booby-trap bomb attached to his car outside his home at Larkfield Manor, Belfast.
- 10 February: shots were fired at an RUC patrol on the Shankill Road, Belfast. It was believed to be a reaction to the ongoing Stevens Inquiry investigating collusion in Northern Ireland between loyalist paramilitaries and state security forces.
- 11 March: the UFF claimed responsibility for shooting dead a Catholic civilian at his home on Kashmir Road, Belfast. Later that night they shot and injured a Catholic taxi driver outside the Mater hospital in North Belfast.
- 18 April: the UFF threatened prison wardens with "the strongest possible action" following clashes over the issue of segregation between loyalist and republican prisoners at Crumlin Road jail, Belfast.
- 7 June: the UFF claimed responsibility for shooting and seriously injuring Sinn Féin director of publicity Sean Keenan at his west Belfast home.
- 15 July: the UFF claimed responsibility for shooting dead a Catholic civilian (Martin Hughes) at his home on Huguenot Drive, Lisburn. The UFF claimed he was a member of the IRA but this was denied by his family.
- 31 July: the UFF claimed responsibility for shooting dead a Catholic civilian at his home on Valleyside Close, Belfast.
- 7 September: the UFF claimed responsibility for shooting dead a Catholic civilian (Emmanuel Shields) at his home on Deramore Street, Belfast. The UFF claimed he had been involved in "intelligence work" for the IRA but this was denied by Sinn Féin.
- 23 September: the UFF claimed responsibility for shooting dead a UDA volunteer and a Protestant civilian in the County Down Arms, Lisburn. It claimed the UDA man was an informer. He died on 7 October. The UFF apologized for shooting the civilian.
- 16 October: the UFF claimed responsibility for shooting dead a Catholic civilian on Rosapenna Street, Belfast.
- 25 October: a UDA volunteer was found shot dead behind a row of shops at Finwood Park, Belfast. The UFF claimed it killed him for being an informer.
- 18 December: the UFF claimed responsibility for a grenade attack on patrons leaving an Ancient Order of Hibernians club in Lisburn, injuring a woman.

=== 1991 ===
- 18 January: the UFF claimed responsibility for a shooting which injured a prominent UDA member and a woman outside a social club in the Shankill Road area of Belfast.
- 27 January: the UFF claimed responsibility for shooting dead a Catholic civilian at his home on Rosapenna Court, Belfast.
- 4 February: the UFF claimed responsibility for six firebombs left in commercial premises in Dublin, including Clerys department store on O'Connell Street. The devices were described as "crude" with no timing mechanisms or power source.
- 2 March: the UFF left a firebomb in a Dublin shopping centre.
- 3 April: a Catholic taxi driver was found shot dead beside his burning car on Thompson's Lane, Belfast. He had been shot in the head by three men who asked for a lift. Although the gun used was traced to the UVF, the UVF denied responsibility. According to reliable loyalist sources, the UDA was responsible. Detectives said the taxi firm was targeted because most of its staff were Catholic.
- 11 April: the UFF claimed responsibility for shooting two men in a South Belfast car park. In a statement they claimed one of the men, a Catholic, was a member of family "steeped in Republicanism" but apologised for injuring the other, a Protestant.
- 17 April: the UFF claimed responsibility for shooting dead a Catholic civilian taxi driver, after he had been lured to a bogus call on Dunluce Avenue, Belfast.
- 26 April: the UFF claimed responsibility for shooting a Catholic civilian on London Street, Belfast. The gunmen had asked him where he lived before shooting.
- 29 April: the Combined Loyalist Military Command (CLMC) (acting on behalf of all loyalist paramilitaries) announced a ceasefire lasting until 4 July. This was to coincide with political talks between the four main parties (the Brooke-Mayhew talks).
- 25 May: the UFF claimed responsibility for shooting dead Sinn Féin councillor Eddie Fullerton at his home in Buncrana, County Donegal, stating that their ceasefire only applied in Northern Ireland.
- 29 June: the PIRA assassinated UDA/UDP member Cecil McKnight at his home in Derry.
- 6 July: the UFF attempted to kill a woman on bail on an IRA charge at Beechmount, west Belfast.
- 27 July: the UFF said it had planted bombs in eight towns in the Republic of Ireland. Three exploded at a department store in Dublin, one at supermarket in Sligo, one at a pub in Dundalk and another at a pub in Dunleer. There were no fatalities.
- 9 August: the PIRA shot dead UDA/UDP volunteer Gary Lynch at his workplace in Derry.
- 12 August: the UFF claimed responsibility for shooting dead civilian Sinn Féin election worker Pádraig Ó Seanacháin in Castlederg, County Tyrone.
- 14 August: the UFF claimed responsibility for trying to kill a Sinn Féin member on Rosapenna Street, Belfast. It also claimed responsibility for detonating a bomb at the Hatfield House pub on the Lower Ormeau Road, Belfast.
- 16 August: the UFF claimed responsibility for shooting dead civilian Sinn Féin election worker Thomas Donaghy in Kilrea, County Londonderry.
- 31 August: the UFF claimed responsibility for shooting dead a Catholic civilian who was lured to Vicinage Court, Belfast.
- 3 September: the UDA shot dead a Catholic civilian at his workplace on Springfield Avenue, Belfast.
- 4 September: South African-born Dr Adrian Guelke, a Queen's University lecturer was injured in a shooting by UFF gunmen at his south Belfast home. South African intelligence had used a doctored RUC report to convince the UDA that Guelke was associated with the IRA.
- 13 September: the UFF claimed responsibility for planting two bombs in mainly nationalist/Catholic areas. The bombs were defused by the British Army.
- 16 September: the UFF claimed responsibility for shooting dead a Sinn Féin civilian election worker and politician, Bernard O'Hagan, in Magherafelt, County Londonderry.
- 7 October: the UFF claimed responsibility for an attempt on the life of a Catholic taxi driver on Ravenhill Road, Belfast. The attacker's gun jammed.
- 8 October: the UFF claimed responsibility for burning a Gaelic Athletic Association (GAA) hall in Kircubbin, County Down.
- 10 October: the Irish People's Liberation Organisation (IPLO) shot dead a UDA volunteer in the Diamond Jubilee Bar on Shankill Road, Belfast.
- 10 October: the UFF claimed responsibility for shooting dead a Catholic taxi driver as he drove along Rosapenna Street, Belfast.
- 14 October: a man survived a UFF attack in East Belfast.
- 14 October: the UFF claimed responsibility for shooting dead a Catholic taxi driver, after he had been lured to a bogus call at Finnis Drive, Belfast.
- 15 October: the UFF claimed responsibility for shooting dead a Catholic civilian at his workplace on Ravenhill Road, Belfast.
- 16 October: a Catholic civilian died two days after being found shot in a car on Tamar Street, Belfast; the UFF claimed responsibility.
- 24 October: a man was wounded by the UFF in Newtownards, County Down.
- 25 October: a man from Dun Laoghaire, County Dublin, was beaten and shot in the head by the UFF, having been seized in a bar on the Shankill Road in Belfast.
- 5 November: at a football match at Windsor Park in Belfast, the UDA/UFF threw a grenade at the supporters of the Cliftonville team, whose members have traditionally been predominantly Catholic nationalists.
- 8 November: the UFF claimed responsibility for shooting a man who had been convicted in 1980 of PIRA membership, on Corporation Street, Belfast.
- 13 November: the PIRA shot dead a UDA volunteer at his home on Lecale Street, Belfast. The man's stepson, a RHC member, was also killed.
- 14 November: the UFF shot and wounded the brother of leading Irish Republican Socialist Party figure Kevin McQuillan in west Belfast.
- 24 November: the PIRA killed two loyalists, a UDA volunteer and a UVF volunteer, when a time bomb exploded in a dining hall of Crumlin Road Prison, Belfast.
- 25 November: the UFF claimed responsibility for shooting dead a Catholic civilian deliveryman on Kandahar Street, Belfast.
- 3 December: the UFF claimed responsibility for firebombing government offices in Dundonald, County Down.
- 13 December: the UFF claimed responsibility for the attempted killing of a prisoner officer in Belfast.
- 19 December: the UFF warned it had planted 12 firebombs in large stores in Dublin. Gardaí only found one device.
- 21 December: the UFF claimed responsibility for shooting dead a Catholic civilian at his home on Fortuna Street, Belfast.
- 22 December: the UFF claimed responsibility for shooting dead a Catholic civilian in the Devenish Arms, Finaghy Road North, Belfast.

=== 1992 ===
- 9 January: the UFF claimed responsibility for shooting dead a Catholic civilian at his chip van on Airport Road in Moira, County Down.
- 14 January: the UFF claimed responsibility for shooting dead a UDA member at his home on Coronation Park in Dundonald, County Down. It claimed he was an informer.
- 26 January: UDA members stabbed to death a Scottish-born lapsed Catholic civilian and former British soldier (John McIver) in the toilets of the Liverpool Supporters' Club in Templemore Avenue, Belfast. Reportedly, four months before his death, McIver cried as he told a friend: "They have found out I'm a Catholic".
- 30 January: the UFF claimed responsibility for shooting dead a Catholic civilian on Longstone Street, Lisburn.
- 2 February: the UFF claimed responsibility for shooting dead a Catholic civilian at his home on Rosemount Gardens, Belfast.
- 5 February: The UFF claimed responsibility for a gun attack on a bookmaker's shop on Lower Ormeau Road, Belfast. Five Catholic civilians were killed and three wounded. This was claimed to be a retaliation for the Teebane bombing by the IRA on 17 January 1992.
- 14 February: the UFF claimed responsibility for seriously injuring Catholic man in a gun ambush shortly after he left his parents home at Copeland Drive, Coleraine, County Londonderry.
- 21 February: the UFF claimed responsibility for a gun and grenade attack on the home of a Sinn Féin councillor in Ardoyne, Belfast.
- 10 March: the UFF claimed responsibility for seriously wounding a west Belfast taxi driver in a gun attack at Knock Eden Drive, south Belfast.
- 12 March: the UFF claimed responsibility for shooting dead a Catholic civilian at his home on Alliance Avenue, Belfast.
- 23 March: the UFF claimed responsibility for a failed murder attempt on Lepper Street, North Belfast; their intended victim wasn't home.
- 29 March: the UFF claimed responsibility for a firebomb which exploded in a Dublin fabric store.
- 2 April: the UFF claimed responsibility for shooting dead Sinn Féin member Danny Cassidy in Kilrea, County Londonderry.
- 10 April: the UFF claimed responsibility for shots fired into a home in Whiteabbey, Belfast.
- 15 April: the UFF claimed responsibility for shooting dead a UDA volunteer at his home on Grahams Bridge Road in Dundonald, County Down. It claimed he was an informer.
- 28 April: the UFF claimed responsibility for shooting dead a Catholic civilian working in a chemist shop on Springfield Road, Belfast.
- 18 May: an incendiary device was found in a wallpaper shop in the centre of Dublin. Gardaí believed it was from a batch planted by the UFF in December 1991.
- 8 July: the UFF claimed responsibility for shooting dead a Catholic civilian at his home on Kerrsland Drive, Belfast.
- 22 July: a UFF assassination squad in transit was intercepted and arrested by the RUC at Finaghy Road North on the outskirts of West Belfast.
- 31 July: the UFF claimed responsibility for gun and grenade attacks on two houses in the Grosvenor Road area of Belfast. It said Irish republicans were the target.
- 9 August: UDA members severely injured a Catholic man in an attack with a hatchet on the Cliftonville Road, Belfast. They were prevented from killing him when a man happened upon the scene and set his German Shepherd on them.

10 August: Patrick Mayhew, then Secretary of State for Northern Ireland, announced that the UDA and UFF were to be proscribed (banned) effective midnight.

- 28 August: the UFF claimed responsibility for shooting a man whose wife was a former Sinn Féin councillor in County Antrim.
- 31 August: the UFF claimed responsibility for three firebombs planted in Dublin city centre, stating it wouldn't tolerate "continued interference in the internal affairs of our country".
- 14 September: the UFF claimed responsibility for a gun attack on the Belfast Dockers Club, where a charity event was taking place inside. Three people were wounded.
- 18 September: shots were fired at the home of a prison officer in Belfast, two days after a UDA threat to kill wardens.
- 24 September: the UFF claimed responsibility for shooting dead a former PIRA volunteer in Dundonald, County Down.
- 27 September: the UFF claimed responsibility for shooting dead a Catholic civilian at his home on North Queen Street, Belfast.
- 30 September: the PIRA shot dead a UDA volunteer in Annadale Flats, Belfast.
- 30 September: gunmen fired into a house in the Whitewell area of north Belfast, showering a baby with glass.
- 1 October: the UFF claimed responsibility for shooting and injuring two Catholic men driving to work in Ligonel, Belfast.
- 5 October: the UFF claimed responsibility for a gun attack that injured a Catholic couple at their mobile home near Lisburn, County Antrim.
- 11 October: the UFF claimed responsibility for an incendiary device which damaged a bookshop in Letterkenny, Count Donegal.
- 15 October: the UFF claimed responsibility for two incendiary devices discovered in a supermarket in Letterkenny, Count Donegal.
- 27 October: the UFF claimed responsibility for the attempted murder of a Catholic man in north Belfast.
- 28 October: a prison officer's home near Belfast was damaged by an explosion. The UFF was blamed.
- 4 November: the UFF claimed responsibility for shooting dead a Catholic civilian outside his parents' home on Fernwood Street, Belfast.
- 6 November: the UFF claimed responsibility for shooting and wounding a security guard at the Mater Hospital in North Belfast. The Red Hand Commando also claimed responsibility.
- 6 November: the UFF announced it was extending its campaign to include "the entire Republican community".
- 7 November: the UDA beat a Protestant civilian to death at her home in Annadale Flats, Belfast.
- 14 November: Attack on James Murray's bookmakers: the UFF claimed responsibility for killing three Catholic civilians in a gun and grenade attack on a bookmaker's shop on Oldpark Road, Belfast.
- 4 December: the UFF claimed responsibility for a gun attack on four Catholic people in a car leaving St. Enda's GAA club on the Hightown Road, Belfast. The group claimed the gang intended to attack the club but had been surprised.
- 9 December: the UFF carried out seven firebomb attacks on shops in Dublin, Dundalk, Moville and Buncrana in the Republic of Ireland.
- 13 December: the UFF claimed responsibility for shooting dead Sinn Féin member and former PIRA volunteer Malachy Carey in Ballymoney, County Antrim.
- 14 December: the UFF claimed responsibility for firing shots at the house of a Sinn Féin member on New Lodge Road, Belfast.
- 31 December: the UFF launched a gun attack on the Sean Graham Bookmakers at Flax Street in Ardoyne, Belfast but their gun jammed.
- 31 December: the UFF issued a statement in which it threatened to raise its campaign of violence "to a ferocity never imagined".

=== 1993 ===
- 3 January: UFF gunmen fired shots at a house in Cliftonpark in North Belfast. There were no reported injuries.
- 14 January: the UFF claimed responsibility for shooting dead a Catholic man and former PIRA volunteer, Anthony Butler, as he sat in a friend's house on Agra Street, Belfast. Butler's mother denied the UFF's claim he was an INLA member.
- 2 February: the UFF claimed responsibility for planting firebombs outside the homes of two SDLP councillors in Belfast.
- 8 February: a UFF murder attempt in Finlay Park in north Belfast failed when the householder blocked the door.
- 21 February: the UFF claimed responsibility for shooting at three taxi drivers at Castle Court, Belfast. Two men were hit but weren't seriously injured.
- 21 February: the UFF claimed responsibility for a submachine gun attack on a taxi driver driving home in North Belfast. He escaped the ambush without injury.
- 10 March: the PIRA shot dead a UDA volunteer on Century Street in the lower Oldpark area, North Belfast.
- 15 March: the UFF claimed responsibility for shooting dead a Catholic civilian as he sat in a van on Quay Road in Newtownabbey, County Antrim.
- 17 March: the UFF claimed responsibility for an incendiary bomb planted outside a pub on the Springfield Road, Belfast, crowded with patrons celebrating St. Patrick's Day.
- 17 March: the UFF claimed responsibility for a gun attack on a house in the Jamaica Street area of Belfast which killed a dog.
- 24 March: the UFF claimed responsibility for shooting dead a Sinn Féin activist, Peter Gallagher, at his workplace on Grosvenor Road, Belfast.
- 24 March: the UFF claimed responsibility for a grenade attack on the home of a Sinn Féin councillor in the Ardoyne area of Belfast.
- 25 March: Castlerock killings – the UFF claimed responsibility for shooting dead three Catholic civilians and a PIRA volunteer at a building site in Castlerock, County Londonderry.
- 25 March: the UFF claimed responsibility for bombing the homes of two SDLP councillors in Banbridge, County Down.
- 26 March: the UFF claimed responsibility for shooting dead a Catholic teenager in Twinbrook, Belfast. Another man was injured but survived when gun jammed.
- 26 March: the UFF tried to kill Protestant man who had just been released from jail on a UDA extortion charge.
- 31 March: UFF gunmen forcibly entered a house and fired several shots, off Finaghy Road South, south Belfast. The Catholic owner escaped injury.
- 1 April: an undercover British soldier shot and wounded a UDA member at the Shankill Road home of UFF commander Johnny Adair, after he was challenged by them. The soldier was part of a 14 Intelligence Company team carrying a surveillance operation on Adair's activities.
- 8 April: a UFF gunman fired several shots into a sweet shop in Lepper Street in the New Lodge area of Belfast.
- 29 April: the UFF carried out a gun attack on a bookmaker's shop in Belfast. Five civilians were wounded. One of the rifles jammed which likely saved lives.
- 1 May: the UFF claimed responsibility for shooting dead Sinn Féin member and former PIRA volunteer Alan Lundy at the home of Alex Maskey in Belfast.
- 10 May: the UFF claimed responsibility for wounding a Catholic civilian in a gun attack in east Belfast, where he was delivering a takeway.
- 11 May: the UFF claimed responsibility for shots fired at three Catholic construction workers at a site in east Belfast.
- 17 May: a UFF gunman was shot by a British soldier in a lookout post after a gun attack on a Sinn Féin advice centre in North Belfast, another UFF member involved was arrested after a house nearby was surrounded by a large RUC/British Army force. Unionist politician Nigel Dodds offered to mediate during the siege.
- 2 June: the UFF claimed responsibility for shooting dead a Catholic civilian while he drove a lorry in Comber, County Down.
- 7 June: the UFF claimed responsibility for a gun attack on the home of a Sinn Féin election agent in Castlewellan. Co Down. Gunmen tried to force entry into the house and when they failed, they fired several shots through a bedroom window.
- 9 June: the UFF claimed responsibility for a grenade attack on the home of Sinn Féin President Gerry Adams in west Belfast.
- 15 June the UFF claimed responsibility for an attempted murder on the Oldpark Road, Belfast.
- 18 June: the UFF was blamed for an incendiary bomb left at the home of an SDLP councillor in Ballymena, County Antrim.
- 4 July: the UFF launched attacks on the RUC during unrest in Loyalist areas following the rerouting of an Orange Order march in the Springfield Area of Belfast and the death of UVF member Brian McCallum in a grenade explosion.
- 4 July: the UFF claimed responsibility for a grenade attack on a Catholic social club in Lisburn. One man suffered shrapnel injuries, and a woman was treated for shock.
- 17 July: the UFF rang the BBC in Belfast claiming to have "spiked" jars of food in supermarkets in the Republic. Gardaí dismissed the UFF's claim as a hoax.
- 20 July: the UFF claimed responsibility for bomb attacks on the homes of three SDLP politicians:
  - a bomb exploded under the car of SDLP MP Joe Hendron at Brislow Park, Belfast.
  - a bomb placed under the car of SDLP councillor Brian Feeney was destroyed by the British Army in a controlled explosion at his home in Bristow Avenue, Belfast. His residence had been subject to a fire bomb attack two months previously.
  - a bomb exploded near the home of SDLP councillor Mary Muldoon on the Lisburn Road, Belfast. Her two young daughters were left "shaken" but there were no serious injuries.
- 23 July: the UFF claimed responsibility for a bomb that partially exploded outside a Sinn Féin office in the New Lodge area of Belfast.
- 27 July: the UFF claimed responsibility for exploding a bomb at the home of a SDLP councillor in Newtownabbey.
- 28 July: the UFF claimed responsibility for a gun attack on the home of a Sinn Féin councillor in Twinbrook, Belfast.
- 30 July: the UFF claimed responsibility for a gun attack on a man whose car had broken down on the M2 Motorway in Belfast.
- 8 August: the UFF claimed responsibility for shooting dead the 21-year-old son of Sinn Féin councillor Bobby Lavery at their home in Belfast.
- 11 August: the UFF claimed responsibility for detonating a bomb under a car on Saintfield Road, Belfast; a Catholic married couple were treated for shrapnel wounds and children in the car suffered shock.
- 24 August: the UFF claimed responsibility for a bomb attached to the underside of a Catholic family's car in East Belfast.
- 26 August: the UFF claimed responsibility for a failed assassination attempt in the Ardoyne area of Belfast.
- 30 August: the UFF claimed responsibility for shooting dead a Catholic civilian at her home on Fortwilliam Park, Belfast.
- 3 September: the UFF claimed responsibility for shooting dead a Catholic civilian at his home on Finaghy Park Central, Belfast.
- 7 September: the UFF claimed responsibility for shooting dead a Catholic civilian at his barber shop on Donegall Road, Belfast. As the UDA/UFF gunman left the premises he also fired at a receptionist who escaped injury by diving under the counter.
- 9 September: the UFF claimed responsibility for bombing the home of republican Gino Gallagher on Farnham Street, Belfast.
- 16 September: UFF members staged a show of force in the Shankill area of Belfast following an abortive assassination attempt by Republicans the previous evening.
- 17 September: the UFF claimed responsibility for firebomb attacks on Gaelic Athletic Association (GAA) halls near Banbridge, County Down and in west Belfast, earlier in the week.
- 20 September: UFF gunmen fired shots over the west Belfast Peace line at a home in the Springfield Park.
- 21 September: the UFF claimed responsibility for bombs at the homes of several SDLP politicians:
  - a small bomb exploded outside the bedroom window of an SDLP councillor in Banbridge, County Down.
  - a bomb exploded at the home of an SDLP councillor in Cranmore Park, Belfast.
  - a suspect device was defused by the British Army outside the home of an SDLP councillor in Ballynahinch, County Down.
  - a bomb exploded at the front door of SDLP MP Joe Hendron at Brislow Park, Belfast, causing significant damage.
  - a bomb exploded at the home of an SDLP councillor in Lisburn.
- 23 September: the UFF claimed responsibility for shooting and wounding a Catholic man at Ava Park, Belfast.
- 23 September: the UFF claimed responsibility for firing several shots through the window of a home at Ladbrook Drive in the Ardoyne area of Belfast. The Catholic family inside, two adults and two children, narrowly avoided injury.
- 25 September: the British Army defused a small bomb left outside the front window of the Falls Community Centre on Kennedy Way in west Belfast.
- 27 September: the UFF called on Unionists to withdraw from all forms of government.
- 30 September: the British Army defused a pipe bomb with shrapnel discovered by the driver of a mechanical digger under his seat in Severn Street, east Belfast.
- 1 October: the UFF claimed they planted a bomb in an inspection duct near Dublin city centre bus depot on 18 September, and also repeated an earlier claim of having contaminated food in Dublin supermarkets during the summer. The device was discovered and defused on 25 November.
- 1 October: UFF gunmen fired several shots at a Catholic man near Shamrock GAA Club in the Ardoyne area of North Belfast.
- 6 October: the UFF claimed responsibility for a gun attack on Derby House Bar on Stewartstown Road, Belfast. One Catholic civilian was killed and two wounded. The UFF said it had intended to kill more people but the gun jammed.
- 7 October: a Catholic family in Larne, County Antrim survived a UFF pipe bomb attack.
- 8 October: the UFF claimed responsibility for a gun attack on a Falls Road taxi in Belfast city centre that wounded six Catholic passengers.
- 9 October: the UFF attempted to kill a Catholic soccer player during a football match at Lisburn Leisure Centre. A struggle ensued and the assailant's gun apparently jammed.
- 12 October: the UFF claimed responsibility for a gun attack on a taxi on the Oldpark Road, there were no injuries because their gun jammed.
- 13 October: the UFF claimed responsibility for shooting a taxi in west Belfast, wounding one woman.
- 14 October: the UFF claimed responsibility for shots fired through the window of a house in Mountpottinger, Belfast.
- 15 October: the UFF claimed responsibility for shooting dead a Catholic civilian on Newington Avenue, Belfast.
- 16 October: the UFF claimed responsibility for shooting and wounding a Catholic civilian in a grocery shop in the Short Strand area of Belfast.
- 18 October: the UFF claimed responsibility for shooting a Catholic security guard at a hotel in south Belfast.
- 21 October: UFF gunmen fired numerous shots at a taxi rank at Springfield/Whiterock junction, Belfast. A Catholic man who ran was chased and shot at.
- 22 October: the UFF claimed responsibility for shooting and seriously wounding a taxi driver in Glengormley on the outskirts of Belfast.
- 22 October: The UFF claimed responsibility for bomb attacks on two Catholic homes in Belfast.
- 22 October: The UFF claimed responsibility for a car bomb which only partially detonated in a Catholic housing estate in Glengormley.
- 23 October: a UDA member and eight Protestant civilians were killed, along with a PIRA member, when a PIRA bomb prematurely exploded in a fish shop on Shankill Road, Belfast. The intended target was a meeting of UDA leaders that was scheduled to take place above the shop.
- 23 October: the UDA shot and injured a Catholic man outside the Boundary Bar in the Bawnmore area of Belfast.
- 23 October: the UDA shot a Catholic delivery driver after luring him to a bogus call at Vernon Court, Belfast; the man died two days later, on 25 October 1993.
- 25 October: young UDA/UFF members were believed to be responsible for a coordinated campaign of petrol bombings of Catholic property in predominantly Protestant areas of Northern Ireland including Dromore, County Down and Lisburn. A Catholic primary school outside Lisburn was also targeted.
- 26 October: the UFF claimed responsibility for shooting dead two Catholic civilians and wounding five in an attack on the Council Depot at Kennedy Way, Belfast.
- 26 October: the UFF claimed responsibility for a gun attack on the Ballymac Bar near Lisburn.
- 27 October: the UFF claimed responsibility for shooting a Catholic man at his parents' home in Braniel, Belfast.
- 28 October: the UFF claimed responsibility for a failed attack in the Lower Falls area.
- 30 October: Greysteel massacre – the UFF claimed responsibility for a gun attack on the Rising Sun Bar in Greysteel, County Londonderry. One gunman was heard to shout "trick or treat!" before he fired into the crowded room, a reference to the Halloween party taking place. Eight civilians (six Catholics, two Protestants) were killed and twelve wounded. The UFF claimed that it had attacked the "nationalist electorate" in revenge for the Shankill Road bombing of 23 October 1993.
- 30 November: the UFF claimed responsibility for shooting dead a Catholic civilian at his workplace, Dundonald, County Down.
- 2 December: a Catholic man survived a Loyalist gun attack at his home in Dunmurray, Belfast.
- 2 December: the UFF/UDA members staged a show of strength displaying various types of automatic weapons including AK-47 rifles, an SA80 assault rifle, Uzi submachine guns, and a belt-fed M60 machine gun.
- 5 December: the UFF claimed responsibility for shooting dead two Catholic civilians (one of whom was a child) as they sat in a car on Ligoniel Road, Belfast.
- 7 December: the UFF claimed responsibility for shooting dead a Catholic civilian at his home on Hillview Avenue, Belfast.
- 13 December: the UFF claimed responsibility for shooting dead a Protestant civilian at a flat on Boundary Walk, Belfast. It claimed he was an informer.

=== 1994 ===
- 2 January: the UFF claimed responsibility for firing about thirty shots at the home of Sinn Féin councillor Alex Maskey.
- 6 January: the UFF claimed responsibility for shooting and wounding a Catholic civilian in west Belfast.
- 8 January: the UFF claimed responsibility for a rocket and gun attack on a pub on the Falls Road in Belfast, which wounded three people.
- 10 January: the UFF claimed responsibility for wounding a Catholic civilian outside a factory in the Dongeall Road area of Belfast.
- 16 January: The Sunday Independent (Dublin based newspaper) contained a story about an alleged UDA plan to carry out "ethnic cleansing". The plan involved the repartition of Northern Ireland followed by the forced removal of Catholics from the remaining area.
- 24 January: the UFF claimed responsibility for planting firebombs at a school in Dundalk and a postal sorting office in Dublin.
- 27 January: the UFF claimed responsibility for shooting dead a Catholic civilian in his lodgings on Kandahar Street, Belfast.
- 7 February: the UFF carried out a failed grenade attack on Sinn Féin's headquarters in West Belfast.
- 8 February: UFF gunmen attacked a home in the lower Ormeau area of Belfast.
- 9 February: a UFF shrapnel bomb exploded in west Belfast. A similar device exploded on a site in Lisburn, County Armagh.
- 11 February: the UFF claimed responsibility for gun attacks on the homes of two SDLP members. One person was wounded.
- 12 February: the UFF claimed responsibility for a rocket attack on the headquarters of Sinn Féin in west Belfast.
- 13 February: the UFF planted three explosive devices in chocolate boxes outside homes in Belfast, one intended for the relative of a Sinn Féin councillor.
- 18 February: the UFF claimed responsibility for a gun attack on the Sinn Féin headquarters in west Belfast, which wounded three workmen.
- 4 March: the UFF claimed responsibility for a pipe bomb attack on the home of IRSP chairman Kevin McQuillan in west Belfast.
- 12 March: a Catholic civilian was wounded after UFF gunmen opened fire from a passing car in the Oldpark area of Belfast.
- 15 March: the UFF abandoned a gun attack after taking over a house in the Riverdale area of Belfast.
- 17 March: the UFF lobbed a pipe bomb in a brick into a vehicle in Glengollan Gardens in the Suffolk area of Belfast.
- 29 March: the UFF claimed responsibility for a rocket and gun attack on the Sinn Féin office on Falls Road, Belfast.
- 30 March: the UFF claimed responsibility for an attempt on the life of a Catholic couple at their home in the Malone Road area of south Belfast.
- 31 March: the UFF claimed responsibility for shooting three Catholic workmen in the Braniel area of Belfast.
- 6 April: the UFF claimed responsibility for a gun attack at a taxi depot in the Turf Lodge area of Belfast.
- 10 April: the UFF claimed responsibility for a pipe bomb attack on a Catholic family living in Hugo Street off the Falls Road, Belfast. Two adults and their children were treated for shock.
- 10 April: the UFF was blamed for a pipe bomb attack on a Catholic family living in Merrion Park, Poleglass, Belfast. Two adults and a three-month-old baby were treated for minor injuries.
- 10 April: a UFF pipe bomb failed to explode at the home of a Catholic family in the Poleglass Estate and was defused by the British Army.
- 11 April: the UFF claimed responsibility for an under-car booby trap bomb abandoned in Corrib Avenue in the Lenadoon area of Belfast. The group claimed it had been unable to attach it to a black taxi.
- 14 April: the UFF claimed responsibility for killing Theresa Clinton (aged 33), a Catholic civilian during a gun attack on her home on Balfour Avenue, Belfast. Her husband was a Sinn Féin member.
- 14 April: the UFF claimed responsibility for shooting a Catholic civilian and his disabled son as they said prayers in north Belfast.
- 18 April: the UFF claimed responsibility for shooting a man in the face on Newtownards Road, Belfast.
- 18 April: the UFF claimed responsibility for an aborted assassination attempt at the postal sorting office, Belfast.
- 18 April: the UFF claimed responsibility for a firebomb attack on a pub in Mallusk, County Antrim.
- 26 April: the UFF claimed responsibility for shooting dead a Catholic civilian at his home on Lepper Street, Belfast.
- 27 April: the UFF claimed responsibility for shooting dead a Catholic civilian as he sat in a taxi on Springfield Park, Belfast.
- 30 April: the UFF claimed responsibility for shooting a Catholic security guard in Newtownabbey.
- 12 May: the UFF claimed responsibility for shooting dead a Catholic civilian at his relative's house on Crumlin Road, Belfast.
- 15 May: UFF gunmen opened fire on a republican hunger-strike commemoration march on the Fall Road, Belfast.
- 21 May: Loyalist gunmen fired on RUC officers during unrest across Belfast following the arrest of several UDA/UFF members, including senior figure Johnny Adair. RUC officers returned fire in the Claire Glen area and believed one person may have been hit.
- 23 May: the UFF claimed responsibility for a bomb attack on the Sinn Féin office in Belfast City Hall. Two workers were injured.
- 26 May: a Protestant man was seriously injured by a UFF bomb, intended for a Catholic civilian, in Dunmurray, on the outskirts of Belfast.
- 28 May: the UFF claimed responsibility for shooting and seriously injuring a Catholic civilian in north Belfast. The victim was found lying in an industrial estate in the Crumlin Road.
- 8 June: the UFF claimed responsibility for firing a rocket at Monahan's pub in the docks area Belfast. The RUC fired shots at the attackers as they fled and recovered the rocket launcher.
- 8 June: the UFF claimed responsibility for planting a firebomb at a snooker club in Trim, County Meath, Republic of Ireland. The bomb caused little damage.
- 14 June: the UFF claimed responsibility for several bombs; one in Lurgan, County Armagh and two in west Belfast. One of the Belfast bombs was left outside the Sinn Féin office in Andersontown, none exploded.
- 16 June: the UFF claimed responsibility for shooting a Catholic man at the Falls Road/Donegall Road junction, Belfast.
- 3 July: the UFF claimed responsibility for a bomb planted outside the home of a Catholic family on Barrack Street, Belfast. The device was defused by the British Army.
- 7 July: the UFF claimed responsibility for two attacks against the homes of prison officers in Belfast. There were no injuries. The attacks came hours after the UFF threatened prison officers and their families over a dispute in the Maze Prison.
- 9 July: a Catholic civilian was found shot dead at Killymoon Golf Club in Cookstown, County Tyrone. The UFF claimed responsibility.
- 11 July: the PIRA shot dead UDA volunteer (and Ulster Democratic Party member) Raymond Smallwoods outside his home in Lisburn.
- 15 July: the UFF claimed responsibility for shooting a Catholic man in Dromore, County Down.
- 17 July: the UFF claimed responsibility for a gun attack on John Loy's pub in Annaclone, County Down. Those inside were watching the 1994 FIFA World Cup Final. Seven Catholic civilians were wounded.
- 21 July: the UFF fired on the home of a Catholic man in the Finaghy area of Belfast.
- 22 July: the UFF claimed responsibility for shooting dead a Catholic civilian at his friend's house on Camross Park in Newtownabbey, County Antrim.
- 24 July: the UFF claimed responsibility for shooting a Catholic workman in north Belfast. The same UFF gunman also opened fire on shopkeepers opening their premises.
- 25 July: the UFF claimed responsibility for a bomb attack on the home of a businessman in north Belfast.
- 30 July: a Catholic civilian was injured was wounded after the UFF fired on a taxi depot on the Grosvenor Road, Belfast.
- 31 July: the PIRA shot dead high-ranking UDA members Joe Bratty and Raymond Elder on the Ormeau Road, Belfast.
- 2 August: a meeting was held by representatives of the UDA and UVF. At that meeting it was decided that loyalist paramilitaries would continue attacking Catholic civilians regardless of any future PIRA ceasefire.
- 2 August: the UFF claimed responsibility for gun attacks on Catholic homes in north and east Belfast.
- 3 August: the UFF claimed responsibility for shooting a Catholic workman on Woodvale Road, Belfast.
- 10 August: the UFF claimed responsibility for shooting dead a Catholic civilian security guard at a supermarket at Orby Link, Belfast.
- 11 August: the UFF claimed responsibility for shooting dead a Catholic civilian at his workplace, a printing press, on William Street in Lurgan, County Armagh. His employed denied a UFF claim that it printed the Sinn Féin magazine An Phoblacht.
- 14 August: a Catholic civilian was found shot dead on waste ground off Ottawa Street, Belfast. The UFF claimed responsibility.
- 17 August: a Catholic taxi driver escaped injury in a UFF gun attack in the Springfield Road area of Belfast.
- 20 August: several shots were fired into two homes, one of them belonging to an RUC officer, in Newtownabbey, County Antrim. The UFF was blamed.
- 1 September: the UFF claimed responsibility for shooting dead a Catholic civilian outside his friend's house on Skegoneill Avenue, Belfast.
- 17 September: the UFF denied responsibility for a loyalist pipe bomb targeting nationalist protestors at the British Army's permanent checkpoint at Coshquin outside Derry. Despite the group's denial, UFF members were believed to have planted the device.

13 October: the Combined Loyalist Military Command (CLMC), speaking on behalf of all Loyalist paramilitaries, announced a ceasefire as from midnight. It stated that "The permanence of our cease-fire will be completely dependent upon the continued cessation of all nationalist/republican violence".

=== 1996 ===
- 18 July: O'Connell Street in Dublin was sealed off for six hours following a UFF bomb hoax.
- 22 December: the UDA planted a booby-trap bomb under the car of Provisional IRA Ardoyne commander Eddie Copeland seriously injuring him.

=== 1997 ===
- 11 June: the UDA shot dead a former member of the "Shankill Butchers" group on Woodvale Road, Belfast, allegedly in retaliation for his part in the murder of a UDA volunteer in the 1970s.
- 7 July: Brian Morton, a "dedicated" member of the UDA and alleged the second-in-command in the UFF South Belfast Brigade, died when a bomb he was holding prematurely exploded at a UDA arms dump by the River Lagan Towpath in Dunmurry.
- 31 December: the UDA/UFF was blamed for a gun attack on Clifton Tavern, Cliftonville Road, Belfast. One Catholic civilian was killed and five were wounded. Although the Loyalist Volunteer Force (LVF) claimed responsibility, the RUC believed that UDA/UFF members took part.

=== 1998 ===
- 19 January: UDA South Belfast Brigade commander Jim Guiney was shot dead by the Irish National Liberation Army (INLA) in Dunmurry. Later that day, the UDA/UFF was blamed for shooting dead a Catholic civilian as he sat in his taxi on Ormeau Road, Belfast. Although the LVF claimed responsibility, the RUC believed that UDA/UFF members took part.
- 21 January: the UDA/UFF was blamed for shooting dead a Catholic civilian at his workplace on Utility Street, Belfast.
- 22 January: the UFF issued a statement saying that it was reinstating its ceasefire following a "measured military response". The statement was seen as an admission that the UDA/UFF had been responsible for the recent killings.
- 26 January: the UDP was expelled from the multi-party talks.
- 10 February: the PIRA was blamed for shooting dead a leading UDA volunteer as he sat in his car on Station View, Dunmurry.
- 24 April: the UDA/UFF issued a statement in support of the Belfast Agreement, saying it would not lead to a united Ireland.
- 7 July: the UFF was responsible for twenty blast bomb attacks during rioting in Carrickfergus, and the Sandy Row and Shore Road areas of Belfast. There were also three reports of gunfire aimed at British Army and RUC patrols. The attacks occurred during rioting protesting the decision to block an Orange Order parade from proceeding in Portadown (see:Drumcree conflict).

=== 1999 ===
10 December: five masked men representing the UFF held a meeting with the Independent International Commission on Decommissioning (IICD). The five men were: Johnny Adair, William "Winkie" Dodds, John Gregg, Jackie McDonald and John White.

== 2000s ==
=== 2000 ===
- 12 July: a UDA volunteer shot dead an Ulster Volunteer Force (UVF) volunteer attending Eleventh night celebrations in Larne. Loyalist feud.
- 21 August: the UVF shot dead two UDA volunteers sitting in a jeep on Crumlin Road, Belfast. Loyalist feud.
- 23 August: the UFF claimed responsibility for shooting dead a UVF volunteer on Summer Street, Belfast. Loyalist feud.
- 28 October: the UVF shot dead a UDA volunteer on Mountcollyer Street, Belfast. Loyalist feud.
- 31 October: the UDA shot dead a Progressive Unionist Party (PUP) member on Canning Street, Belfast. Loyalist feud.
- 31 October: the UVF shot dead Tommy English, a UDA volunteer, in Newtownabbey. Loyalist feud.
- 1 November: the UDA shot dead a UVF volunteer in Newtownabbey. Loyalist feud.
- 6 December: after a Protestant taxi driver was shot dead in Belfast, allegedly by republican gunmen, loyalists shot two Catholic civilians. One was shot dead while working on a building site in Newtownabbey and the other was shot on Oldpark Road, Belfast. Loyalist sources said that dissident UDA members were responsible.

15 December: the UDA and UVF announced an "open-ended and all-encompassing cessation of hostilities", which marked the end of the loyalist feud which had begun in July.

- 18 December: the UDA shot dead one of its own volunteers at Tynedale Gardens, Belfast, in an internal dispute.

=== 2001 ===
- 6 January: the UDA stabbed one of its own volunteers to death near Carryduff in an internal dispute.
- 11 January: a pipe bomb attack was made on the constituency office of SDLP politician Alban Maginness on Belfast's Antrim Road. Maginness blamed dissident UDA members.
- 16 January: the RUC Chief Constable blamed dissident UDA volunteers for a recent wave of sectarian attacks against Catholics in Larne.
- 5 February: in response to a "pipe bombing campaign" blamed on dissident UDA volunteers, the British Army was deployed in North Belfast "to protect the Catholic community". Security sources said that UDA members were involved, but RUC assistant Chief Constable said he did not know if the UDA leadership was orchestrating them. The UDA leadership insisted its ceasefire was unbroken.
- 31 March: members of the Ulster Young Militants (UYM), the UDA's youth wing, beat a Protestant civilian to death in Newtownabbey. The Police Service of Northern Ireland (PSNI) said that they believed it was a sectarian attack and that the UYM thought he was a Catholic.
- 5 April: dissident UDA volunteers were blamed for firing shots into the house of a Catholic family in Ardoyne, North Belfast.
- 23 June: dissident UDA volunteers were blamed for shooting dead a Catholic civilian in his home in a loyalist part of Coleraine.

10 July: the leadership of the UFF released a statement saying that it no longer supported the Good Friday Agreement, but claimed that its ceasefire was unbroken.

- 18 August: the UDA held a parade down Shankill Road in Belfast. The march involved about 15,000 members of the group, about 100 masked men, and 16 bands. The event was held to commemorate Jackie Coulter, who was shot dead during the loyalist feud in 2000.
- 27 September: Ronnie Flanagan, then Chief Constable of the PSNI, said that the UDA was involved in the recent rioting in north Belfast, which was linked to the ongoing Holy Cross dispute.
- 11 October: dissident UDA volunteers were blamed for a blast bomb attack on a Catholic home in New Lodge, north Belfast. Shots were heard as a crowd gathered following the attack.

12 October: John Reid, then Secretary of State for Northern Ireland, announced that he was "specifying" the UDA/UFF and LVF. This meant that the British government deemed their ceasefires to have ended.

- 16 October: dissident UDA volunteers were blamed for a number of pipe bomb attacks on Catholic homes in Duncairn Gardens, North Belfast.
- 26 October: dissident UDA volunteers were blamed for throwing a pipe bomb at a group of British soldiers on Ardoyne Road, north Belfast, injuring a soldier and several RUC officers.
- 11 November: a UYM volunteer was killed when a pipe bomb exploded in his hand during rioting linked to the Holy Cross dispute on North Queen Street, Belfast.
- 16 November: dissident UDA volunteers were blamed for shooting at a Catholic man waiting for a lift to work in Clady, County Londonderry.

28 November: it was announced that the Ulster Democratic Party (UDP) had been dissolved.

=== 2002 ===
- 3 January: a young man linked to the UDA died when a pipe bomb he was handling exploded in a derelict house on Winston Way, Coleraine. The PSNI believed that the house may have been used by the UDA to store explosives.
- 12 January: a Catholic civilian was shot dead as he arrived for work at a postal sorting office in Newtownabbey. The Red Hand Defenders (RHD) claimed responsibility, but the UDA later admitted that its volunteers had been involved.
- 23–24 February: dissident UDA volunteers from Tigers Bay were blamed for attacking Catholic homes in the Limestone Road area of North Belfast. Members of Combat 18 were involved, having come from England as "guests" of the UDA volunteers. A local representative said "It was as if the UDA were showing them how to run a sectarian riot". UDA volunteers were blamed for attacking homes in the same area on 2 April, which led to rioting.
- 3 April: after an attack on a Protestant girl in North Belfast, crowds of loyalists from Tigers Bay tried to invade the Catholic part of North Queen Street. They clashed with the PSNI; fifty blast bombs, petrol bombs and pipe bombs were thrown and up to 30 shots were fired at police. North Belfast Assistant Chief Constable blamed the UDA.
- 6 April: dissident UDA volunteers were blamed for throwing two blast bombs into the home of a mixed religion couple in Newtownabbey. The family escaped before the bombs exploded.
- 11 June: dissident UDA volunteers were blamed for firing shots at youths playing football in north Belfast. The PSNI said they were blanks while the local Sinn Féin councillor said they were live rounds.
- 24 June: dissident UDA volunteers were blamed for a "sectarian" blast bomb attack on a student house in South Belfast.
- 6 July: dissident UDA volunteers from Tigers Bay were blamed for pipe bombing a Catholic home on Newington Avenue, north Belfast.
- 21 July: a Catholic civilian was shot dead as he walked home on Floral Road, north Belfast. Earlier in the evening, a Protestant had been shot and wounded on Alliance Avenue. The RHD claimed responsibility and said that the killing was a "measured response" to that attack. However, the UDA later admitted that its volunteers had been involved.
- 2 September: the "Loyalist Commission", made up of members of the UDA/UFF and UVF/RHC, announced a "period of calm" to help dampen cross-community tensions. The statement called for "republican reciprocation".
- 4 September: dissident UDA volunteers from Tigers Bay were blamed for pipe bombing a Catholic home on Cliftonville Road, north Belfast. They were also blamed for pipe bombing the home of Mark Langhammer, an independent Labour councillor in Newtownabbey. Langhammer, a Protestant, had been outspoken against recent UDA attacks.
- 14 September: dissident UDA volunteers from Tigers Bay were blamed for shooting at a crowd of shoppers on Atlantic Avenue. Three men were wounded in the drive-by shooting.

25 September: Johnny Adair and John White, of the UDA's "C Company", were expelled from the UDA following allegations that they were engaging in criminality such as drug dealing.

- 4 October: UDA volunteers were blamed for shooting dead a Protestant civilian on Ravenhill Avenue, Belfast, possibly as part of a loyalist feud.
- 1 December: UDA volunteers were blamed for shooting dead a Protestant civilian at his home in Ballygowan. The media reported that the killing may have been the result of a dispute with a senior UDA figure in Belfast.
- 27 December: UDA volunteers were blamed for the shooting death of a Protestant civilian in a house on Manor Street, Belfast.

=== 2003 ===
- 2 January: the UDA shot dead one of its own volunteers at Kimberly Bar, Belfast. Internal dispute.
- 19 January: UDA members were blamed for shooting dead a Protestant civilian at a house in Bangor. The motive is unclear.
- 1 February: two UDA members (John Gregg and Rob Carson) were shot dead by other UDA volunteers as they traveled in a taxi through Belfast. The killing was widely blamed on Johnny Adair's "C Company", as Gregg was one of those who had organised the expulsion of Adair from the UDA.
- 5 February: in response to the killing of Gregg, members of the UDA's "C Company" were forced to flee their homes in the Shankill area of Belfast by other sections of the UDA. Many fled to Scotland.
- 8 February: 15 armed and masked loyalists entered Newington Street in north Belfast and hurled pipe and petrol bombs at the homes of Catholics. A pregnant mother-of-three was wounded. A number of shots were fired from UDA-controlled Tigers Bay.
- 22 February: the UDA/UFF announced a 12-month suspension of activity. It also said it would re-enter talks with the decommissioning body but ruled out any imminent disarmament.
- 26 April: dissident UDA volunteers were blamed for firing shots during disturbances at a north Belfast interface. Two PSNI officers were wounded.
- 28 May: the UDA shot dead one of its own leading volunteers, Alan McCullough, and left his body near Aughnabrack Road, Belfast. Internal dispute.
- 20 November: UDA volunteers beat a Catholic civilian to death on Hancock Street, Lisburn.

=== 2004 ===
- 19 September: UDA volunteers were blamed for attacking a Protestant employee working at a disco in Newtownabbey. It is suspected that the motive for the killing was that the man tried to stop the UDA from selling drugs at the disco. He went into a coma and died on 18 March 2005.

=== 2005 ===
- 10–12 September: the UVF and UDA orchestrated large-scale rioting in Belfast and several towns in County Antrim after the Orange Order Whiterock parade was re-routed to avoid the Irish nationalist Springfield Road area. UVF and the UDA members opened fire with automatic weapons on the British Army and RUC. (See: 2005 Belfast riots)
- 4 October: former UDA East Belfast Brigadier Jim Gray was shot dead outside his father's home in the east Belfast Clarawood estate. It was an internal dispute; he had been expelled from the organisation the previous March for "treason" and "building a criminal empire outside the UDA".

=== 2006 ===
- 24 November: UDA volunteer Michael Stone was arrested for breaking into the Stormont parliament buildings while armed in an attempted assassination of Sinn Féin leaders Gerry Adams and Martin McGuinness.

=== 2007 ===
- 1 August: the UDA was blamed for shots fired at police during searches in the Kilcooney Estate, Bangor County Down.
- 11 November: the UDA/UFF declared an end to its armed campaign. The statement noted that they would keep their weapons but put them "beyond use".

=== 2009 ===
- 24 May: UDA volunteers were blamed for the murder of Catholic civilian Kevin McDaid, who was beaten to death in Coleraine.

== 2010s ==
=== 2010 ===
- 6 January: it was announced that the UDA/UFF had decommissioned its weapons in front of independent witnesses.

=== 2012 ===
- 18 February: suspected UDA volunteers from East Belfast were blamed for attempting to shoot dead local UVF leader Stephen "Mackers" Matthews over his involvement in the drugs trade.
- 20 August: the National Union of Journalists (NUJ) revealed that a Belfast-based journalist had received a death threat from the UDA for writing about the UDA. Graffiti including the journalists name and mobile number had appeared in some areas.
- 2–4 September: 2012 North Belfast riots: the PSNI claimed that UDA volunteers took part in the violence between loyalists and nationalists in North Belfast which left over 60 PSNI officers injured.

=== 2017 ===
- 28 May: James Colin Horner was shot in a car park in Bangor. He is thought to be a victim of a UDA feud in East Antrim.

== 2020s ==
=== 2020 ===
- 4 January: Glen Quinn was beaten to death in Carrickfergus. He is thought to have been killed as part of a "punishment beating" for getting in a fight with the UDA leader earlier.

=== 2021 ===
- 4 March: The UDA, UVF, and Red Hand Commando renounced their current participation in the Good Friday Agreement in a letter to Prime Minister Boris Johnson.
- 30 March–9 April: 2021 Northern Ireland riots: Along with the UVF, the UDA was involved in the riots in Loyalist areas in response to Brexit, the Northern Ireland protocol, the funeral of Bobby Storey and COVID-19.

=== 2022 ===
- 30 March: The UDA was blamed for a bomb alert which disrupted Belfast to Dublin rail services.

== See also ==
- Timeline of the Northern Ireland Troubles
