= Attack on James Murray's bookmakers =

1992 shooting in Belfast, North Ireland

James Murray bookmakers' shooting
- Part of the Troubles
- Location: Oldpark Road, Belfast, Northern Ireland
- Date: 14 November 1992; 14:20 (GMT)
- Attack type: Mass shooting
- Weapons: Vz. 58 assault rifle, hand grenade
- Deaths: 3 civilians
- Injuries: 13
- Perpetrators: Ulster Defence Association, UDA West Belfast Brigade

On 14 November 1992, the Ulster Defence Association (UDA), a loyalist paramilitary group, launched an attack on James Murray's bookmakers on the Oldpark Road in Belfast, Northern Ireland. A gunman fired on the customers with an assault rifle, while another threw a grenade inside. Three civilians were killed and thirteen wounded. The shop was in a Catholic and Irish nationalist area, and all of the victims were local Catholics. The attack was likened to the Sean Graham bookmakers' shooting carried out by the UDA earlier that year.

== Background ==
In 1992 there had been an intensification of the paramilitary campaign being carried out by the Ulster Defence Association (UDA). In February, the UDA South Belfast Brigade had killed five Catholic civilians in Sean Graham bookmakers' shooting on the Ormeau Road, Belfast. This was claimed as retaliation for the Teebane bombing by the IRA, which had killed eight Protestant men. 'C Company' of the UDA West Belfast Brigade, led by Johnny Adair, had been particularly active throughout the year, killing several Catholic civilians. This included young mother Philomena Hanna, who was shot dead at the chemist where she worked on the Springfield Road, and 18-year-old Gerard O'Hara, who was shot dead in front of his mother at his home in the New Lodge. The West Belfast UDA also launched a gun attack on the Dockers club in the Sailortown area of Belfast, wounding three Catholics. Major loss of life was averted because one of the doormen managed to close the door before the gunmen could get further inside the club. On 13 November, an IRA van bomb had exploded in the centre of the mainly Protestant town of Coleraine, causing extensive damage.

== The shooting ==
In the afternoon of 14 November 1992 two UDA men entered James Murray's bookmakers on the Oldpark Road in a mainly Catholic area of north Belfast. One gunman, allegedly Stephen McKeag, opened fire on the customers with a vz. 58 assault rifle. Another man, reportedly C Company's second-in-command, threw a Soviet-made fragmentation grenade, shouting "Youse deserve it, youse Fenian bastards" as he did so. Two Catholics, Francis Burns (52) and Peter Orderly (47) were killed outright, while John Lovett (72) died of his wounds in hospital the following day. Lovett was a Second World War veteran who had survived torture in a Japanese camp as an RAF prisoner of war, and reportedly shouted "keep your calm" during the attack. Although it was in a Catholic area, some Protestants frequented the betting shop, and one was among the several wounded in the attack. The killers escaped in a hijacked taxi which was found abandoned less than 200 metres away at Beechpark Place. The attack was reportedly followed by "a raucous celebration in a loyalist club in south Belfast with Johnny Adair occupying centre stage".

== Aftermath ==
In March 1993, an IRA unit from Ardoyne shot dead UDA member Norman Truesdale in his shop at the junction of the Oldpark Road and Century Street. At the time, his family claimed he had no paramilitary links, but his brother later stated his belief that he was involved in the shooting at James Murray's bookmakers, and a UDA mural was painted in the area in his memory. He was also named by Lister and Jordan as a UDA gunman. IRA efforts to assassinate Johnny Adair intensified after the attack, culminating in the 1993 Shankill Road bombing, when an attempt to wipe out the UDA leadership, including Adair, resulted in the deaths of nine Protestant civilians and one of the IRA bombers.

== See also ==
- Timeline of Ulster Defence Association actions
- UDA West Belfast Brigade
- Sean Graham bookmakers' shooting
- Greysteel massacre
