= Top of the Hill bar shooting =

Mass shooting in Derry, Northern Ireland in December 1972

- Part of The Troubles
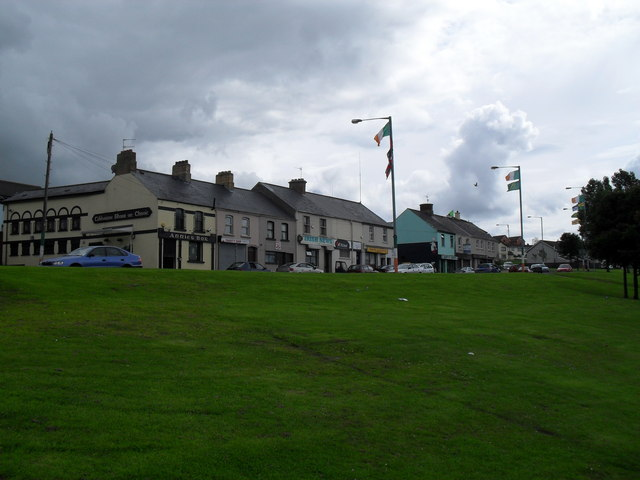
- Annie's Bar (left) in 2009

- Top of the Hill bar shooting (Northern Ireland)
- Location: Strabane Old Road, Derry, Northern Ireland
- Date: 20 December 1972; 10:30 PM
- Target: Irish Catholics
- Attack type: Mass shooting, massacre
- Weapon: Sterling submachine gun
- Deaths: 5
- Injuries: 4
- Perpetrator: Ulster Defence Association

The Top of the Hill bar shooting, or Annie's Bar massacre, was a mass shooting in Derry, Northern Ireland on 20 December 1972, during the Troubles. Five civilians were killed when members of the Ulster Defence Association (UDA), a loyalist paramilitary group, opened fire on the customers in a pub frequented by Catholics.

== Background ==
The UDA was formed in September 1971, during one of the most violent phases of the Troubles, after internment was introduced, when several loyalist vigilante "defence" groups combined. They began using the cover name "Ulster Freedom Fighters" (UFF) to claim responsibility for paramilitary attacks, allowing the UDA to remain legal. The UDA carried out its first killing on 20 April 1972, shooting a Catholic taxi driver in Ardoyne, Belfast. In October, the group was responsible for the deaths of two children when they detonated a car bomb outside a Catholic pub in Sailortown, Belfast.

On 20 December 1972, (the same day as the bar shooting) Ulster Defence Regiment (UDR) soldier George Hamilton was killed by a Provisional IRA sniper a few miles outside Derry.

== Shooting ==
That night, the Top of the Hill Bar (or Annie's Bar) on the Strabane Old Road was packed with customers watching a football match. The pub was in a small Catholic neighbourhood in the mainly Protestant Waterside of Derry city. At about 10:30 pm two UDA gunmen burst into the pub, one armed with a Sterling submachine gun and the other a pistol. They indiscriminately sprayed the pub with gunfire, killing five men: Catholic civilians Charlie McCafferty (31), Frank McCarron (58), Barney Kelly (26) and Michael McGinley (37), and Protestant civilian Charles Moore (31).

The shooting was seen as a sectarian revenge attack for the killing of Hamilton. The massacre shocked the city, which until then had largely escaped the serious sectarian conflict experienced in Belfast. Although no group claimed responsibility, it is believed to have been carried out by the UDA. At the time it was the UDA's deadliest attack. They did not carry out another attack of this size until 1992 when they killed five civilians and wounded nine in the Sean Graham bookmakers' shooting in Belfast.

Nobody was ever charged in connection with the massacre, although in recent years relatives of those killed have been calling for a fresh investigation.

== See also ==
- Timeline of Ulster Defence Association actions
- Greysteel massacre
