= Benny's Bar bombing =

1972 pub bombing in Belfast

Coordinates: 54.6083°N 5.9201°W

- Part of the Troubles
- Benny's Bar after the bombing
- Location: Benny's Bar, Ship Street, Sailortown, Belfast, Northern Ireland
- Date: 31 October 1972
- Attack type: Car bombing
- Deaths: Two Catholic civilians
- Injuries: 12
- Perpetrators: Ulster Freedom Fighters (UFF); Ulster Defence Association (UDA)

The Benny's Bar bombing was a paramilitary attack on 31 October 1972 in Belfast, Northern Ireland. A unit from the Ulster Freedom Fighters (UFF), a cover name for the Ulster Defence Association (UDA), a loyalist paramilitary group, detonated a no-warning car bomb outside the Irish Catholic-owned Benny's Bar in the dockland Sailortown area. The explosion killed two young local Catholic girls trick-or-treating: Clare Hughes (4) and Paula Strong (6). Twelve of the pub's patrons were also injured.

== Background ==
Since its foundation in September 1971, the UDA had killed over 30 Catholic civilians and attacked a number of Catholic-owned businesses. On 13 September 1972, UDA members opened fire inside the Catholic-owned Divis Castle Bar on the Springfield Road, Belfast. One Catholic civilian, the owner's son, was killed. On 5 October it detonated a bomb at another Belfast pub, the Capital Bar, killing a Protestant civilian.

== Bombing ==
On the evening of Tuesday 31 October 1972 in Sailortown (formerly a mixed Protestant and Catholic community beside Belfast docks), a large group of local children in fancy dress were playing near a bonfire in Ship Street to celebrate Halloween. Paula Strong (6) and Clare Hughes (4), each dressed as a witch, were approached by a white-haired man carrying a suitcase. This individual is known to have asked the children for directions to Benny's Bar. One of the girls gave him directions. In response, this man gave the child two pence and walked along Garmoyle Street to its junction with Ship Street, where the pub was located. The two girls then went to the pub, knocked on the door and asked for pennies as a form of the traditional "trick-or-treating".

=== Explosion ===
The Catholic-owned pub was full of patrons when a maroon-coloured mini containing a 100 pounds (45 kg) bomb exploded outside the building's Ship Street side wall, where it had been parked. No warning had been given. Part of the building collapsed onto the customers inside, injuring 12 people. Flying glass and masonry were hurled out into the street, instantly killing Strong and fatally injuring Hughes. A local woman who came upon the bodies of the little girls described what she had seen: "They were just like bloody bundles of rags lying there".

The explosion took place only 20 yards (18 m) from the children's bonfire and the bomb had a very short fuse. Houses and office buildings within a radius of several hundred yards suffered damage. The Strong family, who lived on the adjacent Marine Street, felt the effects of the blast; Paula's brother, Tony, said that there was a massive explosion, the entire house shook and pictures fell off the walls. Paula's father, Gerry, had gone to the pub to help dig out those buried beneath the rubble and found the body of his daughter on the pavement outside. Clare's brother, Kevin, had been playing near the bonfire when the bomb detonated. Their home was in Ship Street, facing the bonfire, and their mother immediately rushed to the scene and brought gravely wounded Clare into the house. She died shortly afterwards in hospital.

The attack was the first major bombing in Northern Ireland for two weeks. With a total of 479 deaths—including those of the Bloody Sunday, Donegall Street, Springhill, Bloody Friday and Claudy atrocities—1972 was the bloodiest year of the 30-year ethnopolitical conflict known as the Troubles.

== Aftermath ==
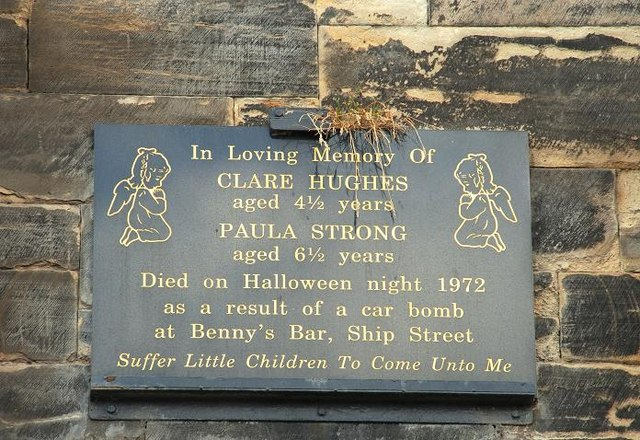
Memorial plaque at St Joseph's Church, Sailortown

The funerals of Paula Strong and Clare Hughes were conducted at St Joseph's chapel in Sailortown; many mourners lined the street and accompanied the coffins as they were carried inside the church. The girls were buried in Milltown Cemetery.

The bombing had been carried out by a unit of the UDA, which was the largest loyalist paramilitary organisation in Northern Ireland and legal at the time. Benny's Bar was targeted by loyalists as it was rumoured to be an Irish republican drinking den. This claim was refuted by Brian Coyle, son of the pub owner, Benny Coyle; Brian Coyle stated that both Catholics and Protestants drank in Benny's and that it was a favourite for seamen. The three UDA men who had driven the car bomb to the pub pleaded guilty to the murders. It emerged during the trial that one of the bombers had worked with Paula Strong's father at the docks.

Benny's bar and the houses in Ship Street were demolished by the early 1980s, as was most of Sailortown to build the M2 motorway. A small section of Ship Street near the Garmoyle Street intersection is now an industrial zone. There is a memorial plaque on an outside wall beneath a stained glass window at St Joseph's Chapel commemorating Paula Strong and Clare Hughes.

On the same day as the UDA bombed Benny's pub, the Red Hand Commando shot dead another Catholic civilian, 17-year-old James Kerr, who was shot while working in a garage on the Lisburn Road.

== See also ==
- Timeline of Ulster Defence Association actions
- Top of the Hill bar shooting
