= Sailortown =

Districts in seaports that catered to transient seafarers

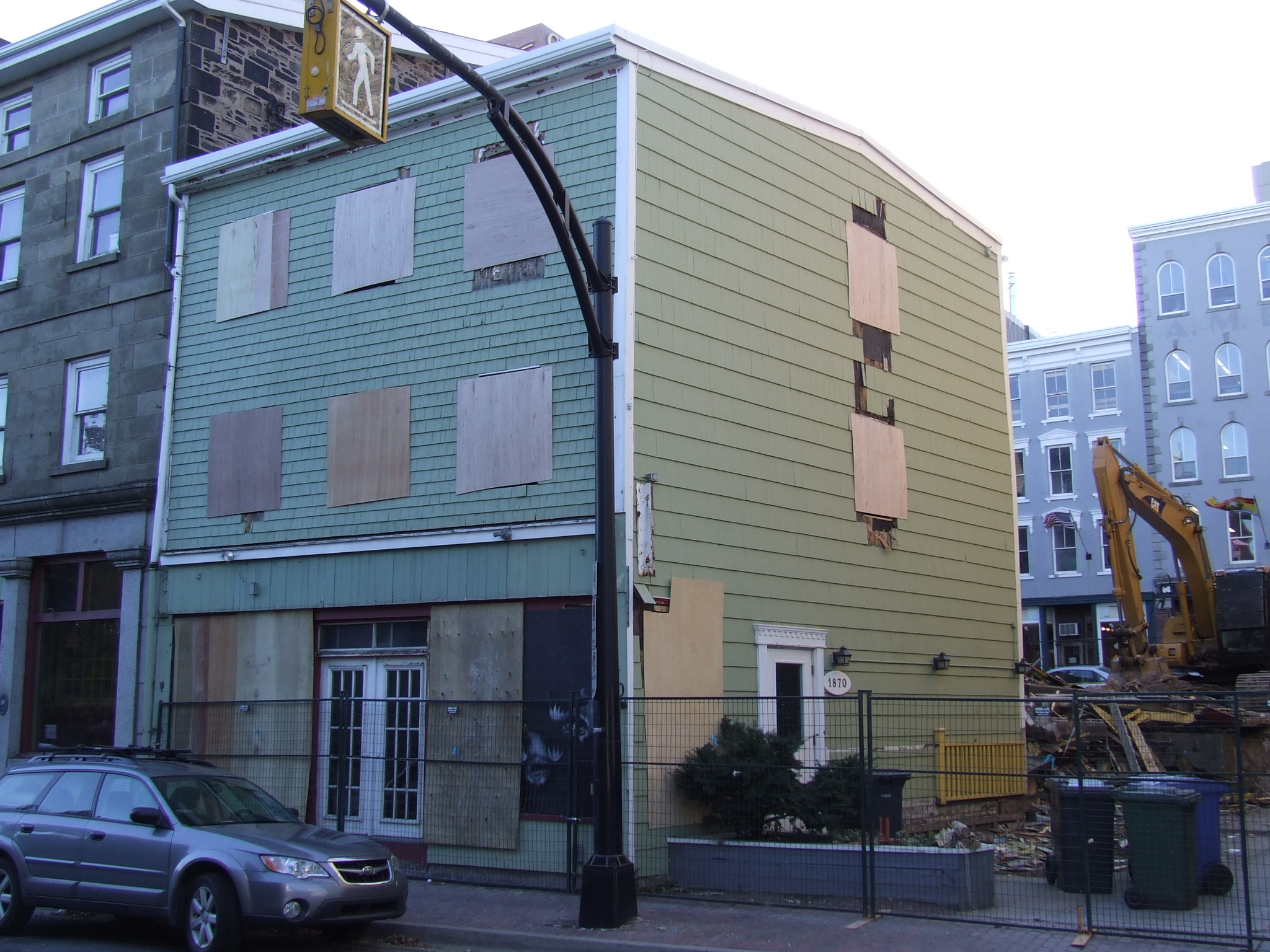
Sweet Basil Building, Halifax, Nova Scotia, Canada. It was the last wooden building on Halifax's Water Street and was typical of the "Sailortown" buildings which served seafarers in Nova Scotia's Age of Sail.

A Sailortown is a district in seaports that catered to transient seafarers. These districts frequently contained boarding houses, public houses, brothels, tattoo parlours, print shops, shops selling nautical equipment, and religious institutions offering aid to seamen; usually there was also a police station, a magistrate's court and a shipping office. Because it took several days, in the past, to unload ships, crews would spend this time in sailortown. These were "generic locations—international everyplaces existing in nearly every port." Cicely Fox Smith wrote that 'dockland, strictly speaking, is of no country—or rather it is of all countries'". Sailortowns were places where local people, immigrants, social and religious reformers, and transitory sailors met.

Sailortowns were found in major seaports, including London, Liverpool, Glasgow, Belfast, Bristol, Cardiff, Hull, Tyneside, Portsmouth, Plymouth, Amsterdam, Antwerp, Hamburg, New York, San Francisco and many others in Europe, North and South America, the West Indies, the East, Africa, and Australia.

Modern methods for handling cargo such as roll on, roll off techniques, and containerization mean that mariners spend less time ashore and this has led to the decline of sailortowns.

== Life in sailortown ==
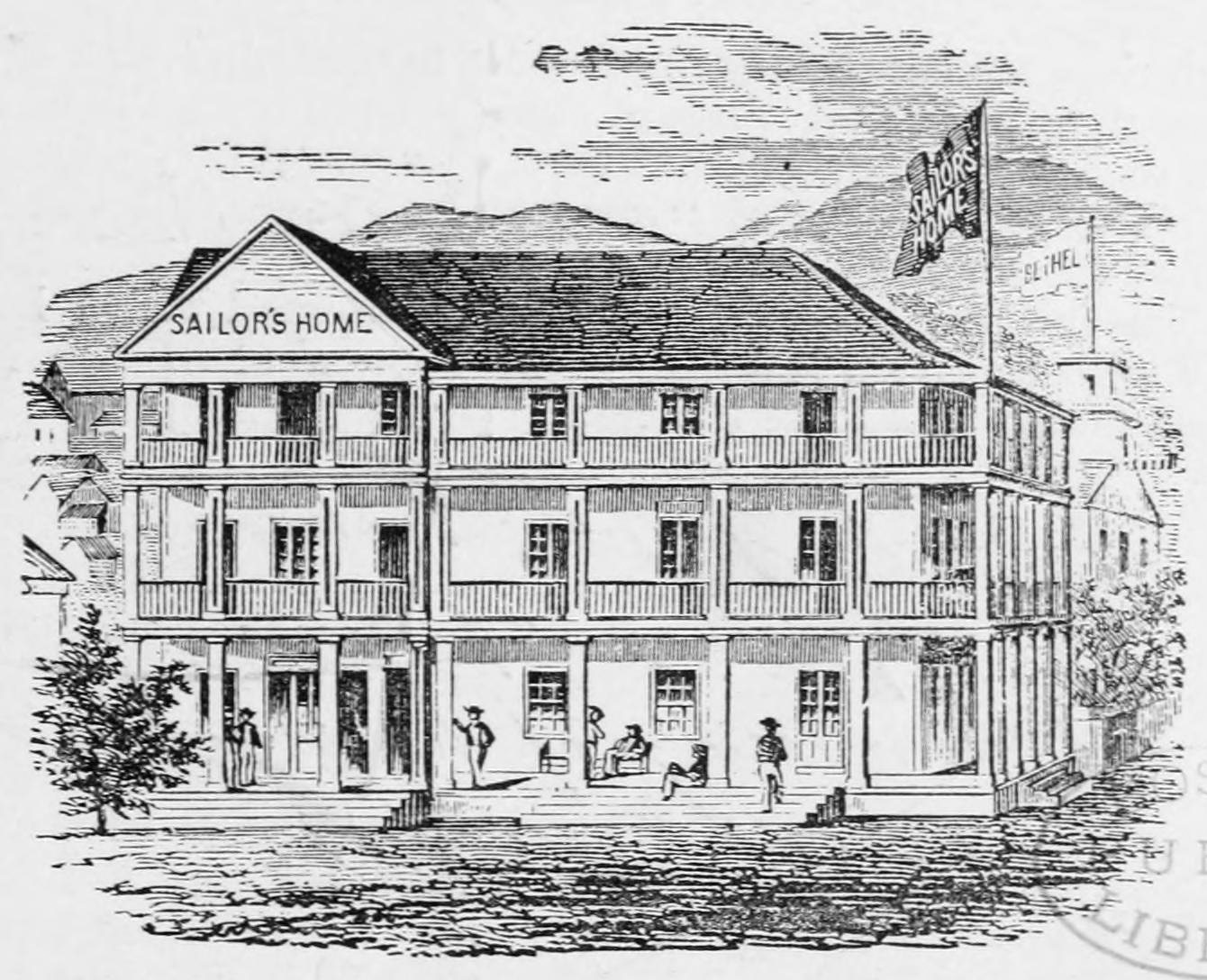
Honolulu Sailor's Home, opened in 1856. Originally located on Bethel Street adjacent to the Port of Honolulu.

Sailors were given their wages as a lump sum at the end of their voyage, and were exploited by crimps and other 'friends' of seafarers: "crimps essentially took control of seafarers' wages and provided them with lodging and entertainment, like an agent." Crimps were also frequently agents for, or owners of, boarding-houses, and they might also have a connection with public houses, brothels, places of entertainment, and places to eat. An extreme version of crimping was shanghaiing, when seamen "would be rendered senseless – either by drink, drugs or blunt instrument – and then were signed-on to a ship".

Folksinger and author Stan Hugill published, in 1967, a book on this topic, Sailortown, but his account has been criticized for "relying almost exclusively on generalisation, titillation and shock-value".

During the nineteenth century, throughout the world, religious denominations established institutions in sailortowns to cater to the spiritual needs of sailors. One example was the Liverpool Sailors' Home project which was launched at a public meeting called by Liverpool's Mayor in October 1844. Such institutions provided such things, as "board, lodging and medical attendance, at a moderate charge" to protect seamen from extortion, as well as "to promote their moral, intellectual, and professional improvement; and to afford them the opportunity of receiving religious instruction". In addition the Liverpool Sailors’ Home had a reading-room, library, and savings bank. In 1859, in Sydney, Australia, a provisional committee of citizens was formed with the object of building a Sailors’ Home to provide them with comfortable accommodation while the seamen were ashore. Construction began in 1863, using a design similar to sailors’ homes in other seaports, on land in George Street North in the Rocks area.

== The seaports ==
=== Liverpool ===
Until the 1970s "much of Liverpool's sailortown area was clustered around the city centre, extending inland from Albert, Canning and Salthouse Docks". The area included "a Sailor's Home and Seamen's Mission to dance halls, bars, boarding houses and shops with most connected to the port".

Found within this district, Liverpool's Sailors' Home, was designed to provide safe, inexpensive lodging for sailors, and to offer educational and recreational opportunities, in contrast to the temptations on offer in the docklands area. It was open for business in Canning Place, Liverpool, England, from December 1850 to July 1969.

American writer Herman Melville describes Liverpool's sailortown in his semi-autobiographical novel Redburn (1849).

=== London ===
London's Sailortown "was clustered in a narrow strip of houses, taverns and slums on the north bank of the Thames, down river from the Tower of London," but also included "the parishes of Wapping, Shadwell and Stepney". This included the area known as Ratcliff, originally known for shipbuilding but from the fourteenth century more for fitting and provisioning ships. In the sixteenth century various voyages of discovery were supplied and departed from Ratcliffe, including those of Willoughby and Frobisher. By the early seventeenth century it had the largest population of any village in Stepney, with 3500 residents. Located on the edge of Narrow Street on the Wapping waterfront it was made up of lodging houses, bars, brothels, music halls and opium dens. This overcrowded and squalid district acquired an unsavoury reputation with a large transient population.

=== Belfast ===
Sailortown was a working-class community in the docks area of Belfast, Northern Ireland. Established in the mid-19th century on partly reclaimed land, it had a mixed Protestant and Catholic population. Urban redevelopment in the late 1960s resulted in Sailortown's eventual demolition; only two churches, several pubs, and three houses remain of the once bustling waterfront enclave.

=== Cardiff's Tiger Bay ===
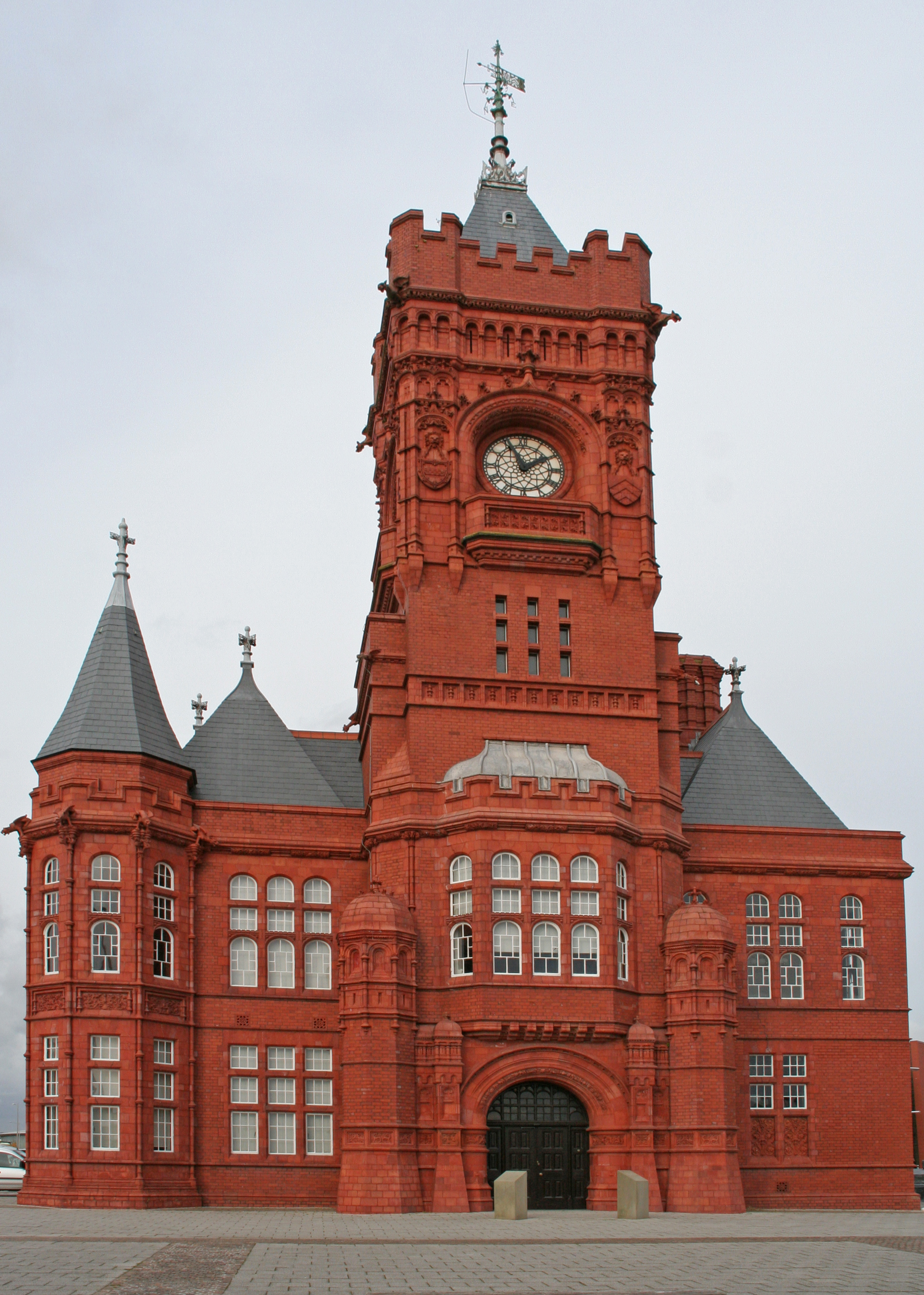
Cardiff's Pierhead Building docks offices

During the nineteenth century as Cardiff's coal exports grew, so did its population; as dockworkers and sailors from across the world settled in neighbourhoods close to the docks, known as Tiger Bay (see also Butetown). This included immigrants from a wide variety of nationalities including Norwegian, Somali, Yemeni, Spanish, Italian, Caribbean, and Irish, helping to create the unique multicultural character of the area.

Tiger Bay had a reputation for being a tough and dangerous area. Merchant seamen arrived in Cardiff from all over the world, only staying for as long as it took to discharge and reload their ships. Consequently, the area became the red-light district of Cardiff, and many murders and lesser crimes went unsolved and unpunished, as the perpetrators had sailed away. However, locals who lived and stayed in the area describe a far friendlier place.

Following the Second World War there was a major decline in the importance of the docks and therefore of sailortown. In 1999, the area was redeveloped by the Cardiff Bay Development Corporation, and renamed "Cardiff Bay".

=== San Francisco ===
According to author Daniel Bacon, daytime San Francisco's "old Barbary Coast was quiet, save for a few clothing shops, maritime businesses and auction houses". However, in the evening it was dangerous a place of opium dens, crimping joints, bars, brothels and gambling dens, where unsuspecting sailors, "after having completed a long journey were slipped Mickey Finns—whiskey laced with a dollop of opium—and shanghaied on two-year long voyages. Skippers paid crimps up to $75 a head to supply able-bodied hands to crew their vessels".

It was not until the 1860s when sailors gave the district its name, and began to refer to it as the Barbary Coast. The term "Barbary Coast" is borrowed from the Barbary Coast of North Africa. That African region was also notorious for the same kind of predatory dives which would target sailors, as had been done on San Francisco's Barbary Coast. Miners, sailors, and others hungry for female companionship and bawdy entertainment streamed into San Francisco's Barbary Coast.

== See also ==
- Apostleship of the Sea (Roman Catholic)
- Mission to Seafarers (Anglican)
- Nautical fiction
