= Sailortown (Belfast) =

Area of Belfast, Northern Ireland

Coordinates: 54.609°N 5.921°W

Sailortown was a working-class dockland community in the docks area of Belfast, Northern Ireland. Established in the mid-19th century on partly reclaimed land, it had a mixed Protestant and Catholic population. The 1907 dock strike called by trade union leader James Larkin commenced in Sailortown before spreading throughout the city.

Urban redevelopment in the late 1960s resulted in Sailortown's eventual demolition. As of 2021, only two churches, one pub and three houses remain of the once bustling waterfront enclave. However, a combination of private investment in the greater Docks area and building of social housing by associations such as Clanmill has led to a growth in population since 2010 in the Pilot St area.

Whitla Street Fire Brigade station at the edge of Sailortown with the docks visible in the background. The firemen and their families lived in houses behind the station.

A "sailortown" is a dockland area "that catered to the transient population of seafarers" that have existed in seaports throughout the world.

== Location ==
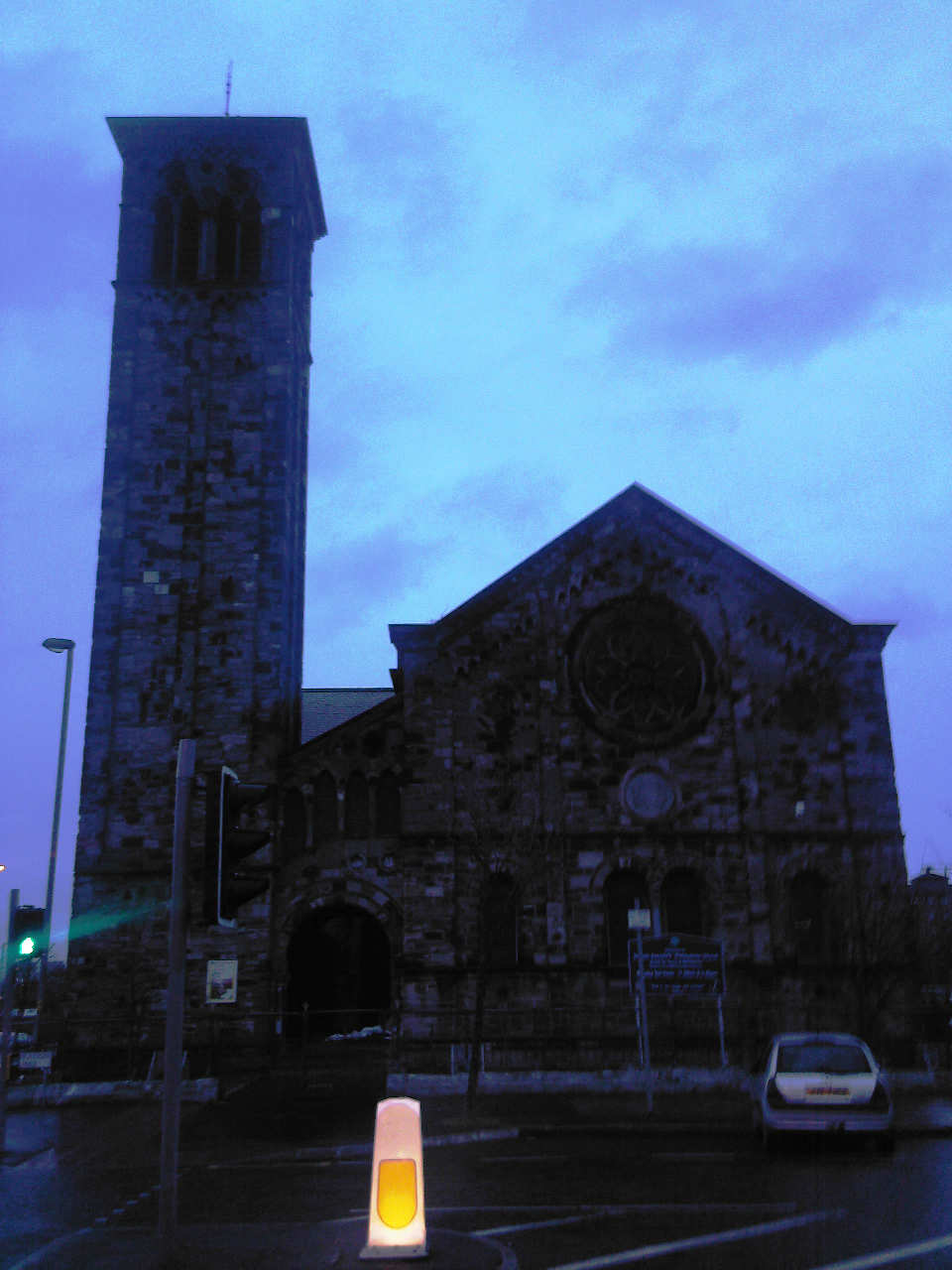
Sinclair Seamen's Presbyterian Church, in Corporation Street. The maritime-themed church was commissioned by Thomas Sinclair and built in 1856 by architect Charles Lanyon.

Sailortown is in the Docks area north of Belfast city centre. It is bordered by Henry Street, York Street and the Whitla Street dock gate. It was adjacent to the old York Road railway station. Garmoyle Street serves as Sailortown's main arterial road, and at one time over 5,000 people lived in the small, cobblestoned streets of red-brick terraced houses packed between the docks and York Street. Visiting sailors from many European nations (in particular those bordering the Baltic Sea) and from even as far away as India and China added to the resident population, which was mixed Protestant and Catholic. People from all over the island of Ireland settled in Sailortown, including many who were left destitute during the Great Famine. The late 19th century saw the arrival of many Italian immigrants; this community, known as "Little Italy", was largely based around Little Patrick Street adjacent to the southern end of Sailortown.

The maritime-themed Sinclair Seamen's Presbyterian Church and St. Joseph's Chapel, a Catholic church, served as the places of worship for the Sailortown populace. Sinclair Seamen's church is still standing on Corporation Street.

St Joseph's Church, built in 1880 on Princes Dock Street, was closed by the Diocese of Down and Connor in 2001, due to falling attendance. The Sailortown Regeneration Group (SRG) obtained a 150-year lease of the church in 2017 and restored the property; it currently rents out the space for events. The Belfast City Council's Neighbourhood Regeneration Fund granted funding to SRG to further the building's restoration.

The Midlands Hotel, adjacent to Sailortown on York Street, was once known as one of Belfast's most prestigious hotels. Notable guests included Laurel and Hardy and 1960s singer P. J. Proby.

== History ==
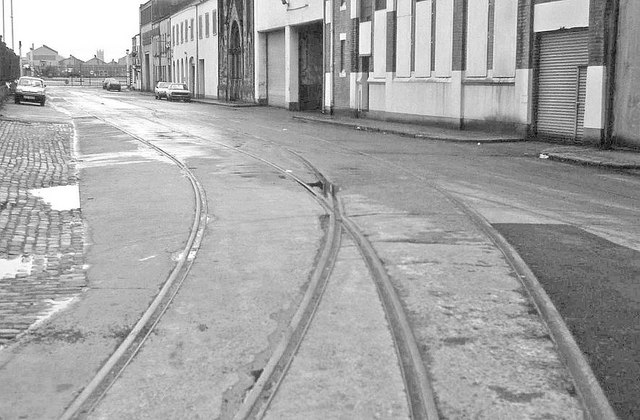
Remnants of tram lines on Prince's Dock Street

The working-class enclave of Sailortown was established on partly reclaimed land in the mid-19th century and was Belfast's first waterfront village. It came into being in the period when Belfast's industry expanded and flourished; Sailortown was displayed on an 1845 Belfast street map. In addition to the docks and warehouses, Sailortown had linen mills, factories, a large fire station, a hotel, boarding houses, a variety of shops and businesses, and many pubs and taverns. Later there were a number of boxing clubs and cinemas. Many local men found employment as dock labourers, carters or merchant seamen; the women worked in the mills and cigarette factories. Most families had men away at sea, including boys as young as 14. During the period when Belfast reached its apex as the hub of the shipbuilding, engineering, and linen manufacturing industry, there were more than 2000 men working in the docks. The main distribution centre was beside the railway station with a constant flow of horses and carts passing through the main thoroughfares.

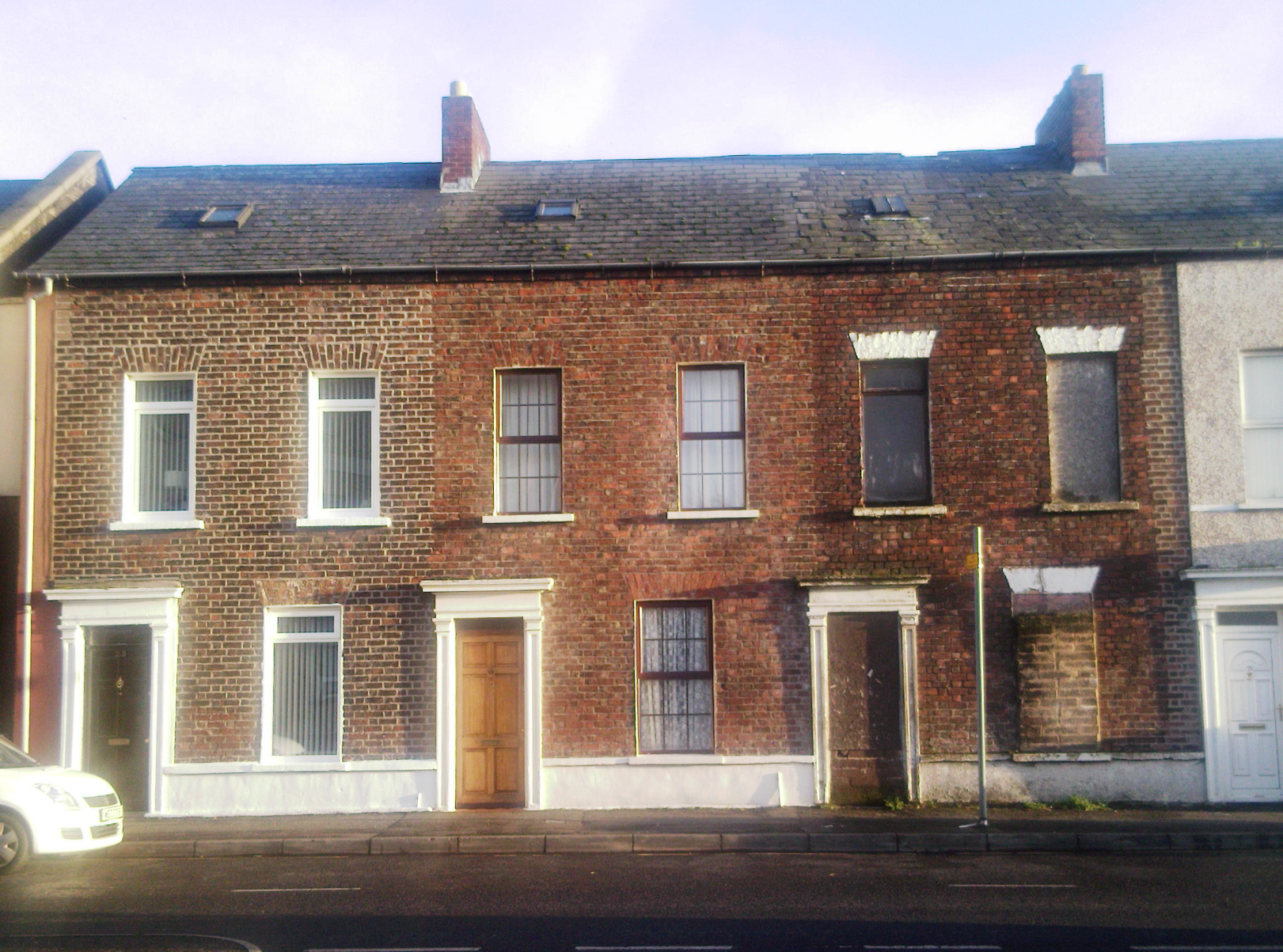
Houses on Garmoyle Street, one of the few parts of old Sailortown remaining

Life was hard for most of the people in Sailortown as they had to endure harsh working conditions with low wages and return home to small, damp, dilapidated homes, which often housed more than one family. The waterfront was described as having been "desperate with crime and inhumanity". As a result of these factors, Sailortown became closely affiliated with Irish trade unionism and the Labour movement. In January 1907, trade union leader James Larkin arrived in Belfast with the aim of organising the dock workers for the National Union of Dock Labourers (NUDL). He was successful in bringing the dockers and carters, both Protestant and Catholic, into the NUDL union. In May of that same year, he sent them out on strike after their employers refused their demand for higher wages, better conditions and union recognition. The strike soon spread across the city and the striking dockers and carters were joined by transport workers, coal heavers, shipyard workers, boilermakers, firemen, sailors, and factory workers. The strike lasted until 28 August, and was largely unsuccessful; the British Army was eventually sent in to restore order after the Royal Irish Constabulary (RIC) mutinied. The dockers' strike and lock-out did, however lead to Larkin establishing the Irish Transport and General Workers' Union (ITGWU).

Protestants and Catholics were not always segregated, often living in neighbouring houses and sharing the same workplace. As a rule, however, 'upper' Sailortown between Nelson St and York St was predominately Protestant, while the district closer to the chapel was mostly Catholic. Despite being host to a steady stream of foreign sailors, Sailortown was a close-knit community and viewed strangers with mistrust and suspicion. William Murphy, the father of loyalist Lenny Murphy (the leader of the notorious Shankill Butchers gang), was a dock labourer from Sailortown's Fleet Street. Jobs in Sailortown were traditionally passed from father to son; Lenny Murphy's grandfather had also worked as a dock labourer.

Parts of Sailortown were damaged during the Second World War when the Luftwaffe rained bombs down onto Belfast on the nights of 7 April, 15/16 April and 4/5 May 1941, the Docks being a strategic target for the German bombers. Many buildings in Sailortown were engulfed with fire, the docks were hit and the Victorian York Street Spinning Mill was completely destroyed.

=== Demolition and redevelopment ===
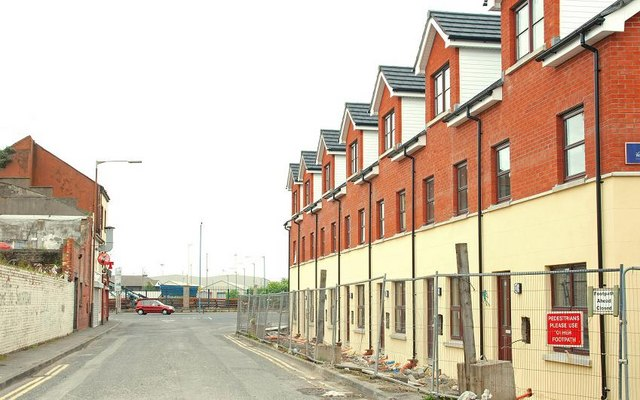
Short Street looking towards Prince's Dock Street, 2009

The gradual demolition of Sailortown began in the late 1960s to construct the M2 motorway. The population was largely dispersed and rehoused in districts such as the Shore Crescent, a Protestant development adjacent to the Greencastle suburb of North Belfast, and the New Lodge. The last terrace of houses in Ship Street was knocked down in the 1970s. The Docks area has been extensively redeveloped and only three houses from the original Sailortown community remain standing. From the mid-1980s, the "Rotterdam Bar", an old historic pub at the corner of Pilot Street and the harbour gates close to Clarendon Dock, was a popular venue for live music – in particular alternative rock bands. The 19th-century pub was slated for demolition in 2008. That plan, however, was shelved, although the bar has been closed from the early 2010s.

The Sailortown Cultural and Historical Society was founded in October 1999. Since the beginning of the 21st century, some new houses and apartment buildings have been built in the area as part of a Sailortown regeneration scheme. St Joseph's is currently in a state of renovation and is opened for community events.

=== The Troubles ===
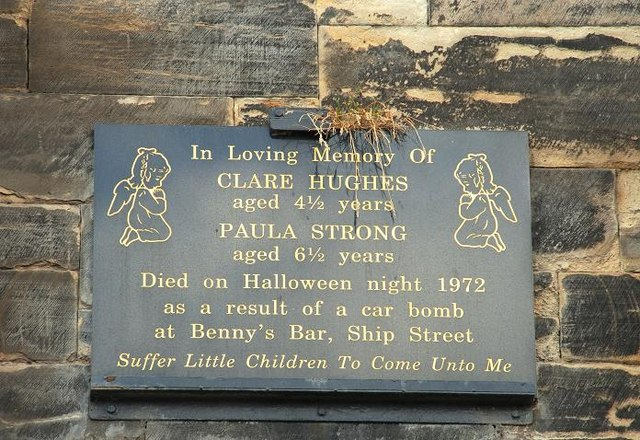
Memorial plaque on St. Joseph's Chapel commemorating the two children killed in a 1972 UDA car bomb attack.

On 21 July 1972, known as Bloody Friday, the Provisional IRA set off 22 bombs in Belfast; one of the explosions destroyed the premises of a seed merchant on Garmoyle Street. Stephen Parker, who at age 14 became the youngest victim of the day's bombings, was the son of the Reverend Joseph Parker, at the time chief chaplain of the Flying Angel Club. This was a seamen's mission in Sailortown located on Corporation Street, providing a temporary home for visiting sailors. Several months before Stephen was killed in the Cavehill Road blast, a bomb exploded in the vicinity of the mission and destroyed part of the building.

On Halloween night 1972, two young Catholic girls, Paula Strong (aged 6) and Clare Hughes (4), were in costume dress and playing near a bonfire when a 100-pound car bomb planted by the Ulster Defence Association (UDA) exploded nearby outside Benny's Bar at the corner of Ship Street and Garmoyle Street. They were both killed in the blast and 12 customers inside the pub suffered injuries. There is a memorial plaque commemorating the girls on the façade of the defunct St. Joseph's church.

Fireman Brian Douglas, a Protestant based at the old Whitla Street fire station, was shot dead on 7 February 1973 by loyalist paramilitaries whilst fighting a fire caused by street disturbances in Bradbury Place, Sandy Row. A study room is dedicated to his memory at the new Whitla Street fire station which opened later that year.

In February 2003, UDA brigadier John Gregg and associate Rab Carson were shot dead whilst travelling in a taxi in Nelson Street near the docks. They had just returned to Belfast after attending a Rangers F. C. match in Glasgow. The killing was carried out by rivals from the UDA's "C Company" as part of an internal feud.

== Notable residents ==
Natives of Sailortown include Paul Hill, one of the Guildford Four, who spent his childhood in Sailortown before his family moved to west Belfast. Notorious street fighter, bootlegger and member of the Ulster Volunteers, Buck Alec Robinson, was also from the area, having been born in York Street and raised in Back Ship Street. He was often seen walking his two pet lions through Sailortown. The lions, which he had obtained from a visiting circus, were kept inside a cage in a back yard. He frequently invited local children in to see them. Footballer Jimmy Hasty was another Dockland resident.

== Sailortown in popular culture ==
Novelist Eoin McNamee wrote about Sailortown in his novel Resurrection Man.

Playwright Martin Lynch's 1981 play Dockers vividly recreates Sailortown life in the early 1960s, its central theme being the fierce competition for jobs amongst the dockers and the power of the union which was the final arbitrator in who was hired or not.

Irish artist Terry Bradley was inspired by Sailortown to feature its dockers in a series of paintings.

Northern Irish singer/songwriter Anthony Toner's song "Sailortown" was written following a performance at the Rotterdam Bar. It is featured on his album A Sky For Every Day.

Sailortown native John Campbell has published poems about Sailortown. Two of his books, Corner Kingdom and The Disinherited, are set in Sailortown's Docks. The latter book is based on the corrupt system which existed in the Docks beginning at the outbreak of the Second World War when men known as "Blue Button Men" were given preference in hiring over the Red Button Men who could only obtain work if they had fathers or brothers who were themselves employed as dockers.
