= List of terrorist incidents in 1993 =

This is a timeline of incidents in 1993 that have been labelled as "terrorism" and are not believed to have been carried out by a government or its forces (see state terrorism and state-sponsored terrorism).

== Guidelines ==
- To be included, entries must be notable (have a stand-alone article) and described by a consensus of reliable sources as "terrorism".
- List entries must comply with the guidelines outlined in the manual of style under MOS:TERRORIST.
- Casualty figures in this list are the total casualties of the incident including immediate casualties and later casualties (such as people who succumbed to their wounds long after the attacks occurred).
- Casualties listed are the victims. Perpetrator casualties are listed separately (e.g. x (+y) indicate that x victims and y perpetrators were killed/injured).
- Casualty totals may be underestimated or unavailable due to a lack of information. A figure with a plus (+) sign indicates that at least that many people have died (e.g. 10+ indicates that at least 10 people have died) – the actual toll could be considerably higher. A figure with a plus (+) sign may also indicate that over that number of people are victims.
- If casualty figures are 20 or more, they will be shown in **bold**. In addition, figures for casualties more than 50 will also be **underlined**.
- Incidents are limited to one per location per day. If multiple attacks occur in the same place on the same day, they will be merged into a single incident.
- In addition to the guidelines above, the table also includes the following categories:

0 people were killed/injured by the incident.
1–19 people were killed/injured by the incident.
20–49 people were killed/injured by the incident.
50–99 people were killed/injured by the incident.
100+ people were killed/injured by the incident.

== List ==
Date	Type	Dead	Injured	Location	Details	Perpetrator	Part of
January 7	Car bombing	2	39	Medellín, Colombia	A car bomb kills two and injures 39 in the parking lot of a building where several judges lived.	Medellín Cartel	Colombian conflict
January 25	Shooting	2	3	Langley, Virginia, United States	Pakistani immigrant Mir Qazi opened fire on CIA employees outside the CIA headquarters. Qazi committed the shootings because he was angered at U.S. foreign policy towards Muslim nations.	Mir Qazi	Terrorism in the United States
January 30	Bombing	25	70	Bogotá, Colombia	A bomb kills 25 and injures 70, 12 days after a letter was published from fugitive cocaine king Pablo Escobar vowing to renew his all-out war on the Colombian state	Medellín Cartel	Colombian Conflict
February 11	Bombing	14	25	Barrancabermeja, Colombia	A bomb kills 14 and injures 25 at an auto repair shop.	Unknown	Colombian conflict
February 15	Bombing	4	100+	Bogotá, Colombia	Two bombs kill 4 and wound over 100.	Unknown	Colombian conflict
February 26	Truck Bombing	6	1,042	New York City, United States	World Trade Center bombing kills six and injures over 1000 people, by coalition of five groups: Jamaat Al-Fuqra'/Gamaat Islamiya/Hamas/Islamic Jihad/National Islamic Front, see FBI Most Wanted Terrorists, FBI Ten Most Wanted Fugitives, Ramzi Yousef.	Ramzi Yousef and co-conspirators	
March 12	Bombings	257	1,400	Bombay, India	13 bombings targeting banks, hotels, the Bombay Stock Exchange and other buildings. The bombings were organized by Dawood Ibrahim, the leader of D-Company.	D-Company	
March 20	Bombings	2	56	Warrington, United Kingdom	Two PIRA bombs exploded in trash bins on Bridge Street, killing two children and injuring dozens.	PIRA	The Troubles
March 24	Massacre	33	3	Elazığ and Bingöl, Turkey	The May 24, 1993 PKK attack, sometimes referred to as the Bingöl massacre was a Kurdistan Workers Party (PKK) attack on unarmed Turkish soldiers on the Elazığ-Bingöl highway, 13 km (8.1 mi) west of Bingöl. 33 soldiers and varying conflicting accounts of civilians were killed	Kurdistan Workers' Party	Kurdish–Turkish conflict (1978–present)
March 25	Mass shooting	4	1	Castlerock, Northern Ireland	Three Catholic civilians and one Provisional IRA member are killed in a UDA attack at a building site.	UDA	The Troubles
April 9	Land mine	22	13	Karnataka, India	A bus is destroyed by a land mine planted by criminal leader Veerappan and his supporters.	Veerappan and co-conspirators	
April 15	Bombings	8	242	Bogotá, Colombia	A car bomb with 150 kg of explosives blows up in front of the Centro 93 shopping mall, killing 8 and injuring 242. The blast destroys 100 commercial properties and leave damages valued at 1.5 Bn COP	Medellín Cartel	Colombian conflict
April 16	Suicide bombing	1 (+1 attacker)	7–9	Mehola, West Bank	Hamas kill 2 in Mehola Junction bombing.	Hamas	Israeli–Palestinian conflict
April 24	Truck bombing	1	44	City of London, United Kingdom	IRA detonate a huge truck bomb at Bishopsgate, killing one person and causing approximately £1bn of damage. (See 1993 Bishopsgate bombing.)	PIRA	The Troubles
April 24–25	Hijacking	0 (+1 attacker)	0	Amritsar, India	Mohammed Yunus Shah hijacks Indian Airlines Flight 427 but is killed before he is able to harm any of the passengers. India accused the Hizbul Mujahideen of being behind the attack, but they denied responsibility.	Mohammed Yunus Shah; Hizbul Mujahideen (suspected)	Insurgency in Jammu and Kashmir
May 1	Suicide Bombing	1 (+1 attacker)	0	Colombo, Sri Lanka	Suicide bomber from LTTE kills President Ranasinghe Premadasa.	LTTE	Sri Lankan Civil War
May 28	Arson	5	14	Solingen, Germany	Four neo-Nazis set fire to a house belonging to a Turkish immigrant family.	neo-Nazis	
June 21	Car bombings	7	29	Madrid, Spain	ETA detonates two car bombs targeting an army convoy.	ETA	Basque conflict
July–August 18	Letter bomb, car bombing	0	3	Caracas, Venezuela	Letter bomb sent to the Supreme Court of Justice and car bomb in the CCCT shopping mall, among other attacks.	Ramiro Helmeyer.	
July 2	Arson	35 (+2 attackers)	51+	Sivas, Turkey	A mob of Islamic fundamentalists set a hotel housing Alevi intellectuals on fire. 37 die and more than 51 are injured.	Islamic fundamentalists	
July 5	Mass shooting, arson	33	0	Başbağlar, Erzincan Province, Turkey	Several PKK members stormed the village and went on killing civilians one by one after rounding them up. Over 200 houses, a clinic, a school and a mosque were burned down.	PKK	Turkey-PKK conflict
July 25	Mass shooting	11	58	Cape Town, South Africa	Members of the Azanian People's Liberation Army, open fire on a congregation inside St James Church in Kenilworth, Cape Town, killing 11 and injuring fifty.	Azanian People's Liberation Army	
August 8	Bombing	11	7	Chennai, India	The head office of the Chennai wing of the Hindu nationalist organization Rashtriya Swayamsevak Sangh is bombed.	Islamists	
October 5	Attempted Attack	0 (+13)	1	Riofrío, Valle del Cauca, Colombia	In the village of El Bosque, Piedras Portugal, 13 ELN guerrillas died in combat with troops from the Palacé Battalion of the III Brigade. They were surprised while they prepared a handstand.	ELN	Colombian conflict
October 11	Assassination attempt	0	1	Oslo, Norway	The publisher of Aschehoug William Nygaard was shot and got critically injured outside his residence. Police never found the perpetrator, but it is believed that the reason for the assassination was Aschehoug's publication of Salman Rushdie's controversial novel The Satanic Verses, which triggered an Islamist fatwa against the author, the translators and publishers.	Islamic republic of Iran	
October 23	Bombing	9 (+1 attacker)	57	Belfast, Northern Ireland	Two members of the Provisional IRA entered a shop on Shankill Road where they believed a UDA meeting was taking place. However, the meeting had been rescheduled and the bomb detonated prematurely, killing one of the bombers, an UDA member and eight civilians.	PIRA	The Troubles
October 25	Massacre	38	50	Çat, Erzurum Province, Turkey	The Yavi Massacre was a mass shooting organized by the PKK in the Yavi neighbourhood.	Kurdistan Workers' Party	Kurdish–Turkish conflict (1978–present)
October 30	Mass shooting	8	12	Greysteel, Northern Ireland	Eight civilians (six Catholic, two Protestant) were killed and twelve wounded in a UDA attack on the Rising Sun Bar in County Londonderry. The UDA/UFF claimed that it had attacked the "nationalist electorate" in revenge for the Shankill Road bombing.	UDA	The Troubles
November 18	Ambush	5		Apure State, Venezuela	Five Venezuelan army troops were killed during an ambush attributed to the Colombian ELN in Guafitas.	ELN	Colombian conflict
December 9	Massacre	17	Unknown	Antioquia Department, Colombia	Rebels of the Popular Commands (demobilized from the EPL) assassinate 12 workers of a banana hacienda Los Katíos, located between Apartadó and Turbo, affiliated to the Communist Party. On the same day, insurgents of the V Front of the FARC, assassinate 5 members of the Esperanza, Paz, Libertad movement at La Ceja de Turbo.	Popular Liberation Army and FARC	Colombian conflict
December 16	Ambush	11	6 kidnapped	Sucumbíos Province, Ecuador	FARC guerrillas attack an Ecuadorian police patrol in Peña Colorada. One policemen die and three soldiers and others in uniform disappear	FARC	Colombian conflict
December 18	Shooting	14 (+10)	10	Boyacá, Colombia	A fierce shootout in Güicán pits 250 troops from Brigades I and XVI, with 160 guerrillas from the Domingo Laín ELN front. 14 soldiers and ten rebels are dead.	ELN	Colombian conflict
December 30	Mass shooting	4	5	Cape Town, South Africa	Six members of the Azanian People's Liberation Army, the armed wing of the Pan Africanist Congress, open fire on patrons of the Heidelberg Tavern in Observatory, Cape Town, killing four people (Jose Cerqueira, Lindy-Anne Fourie, Bernadette Langford, and Rolande Palm) and injuring several others.	Azanian People's Liberation Army	

== See also ==
- List of terrorist incidents
