= Billy McFarland (loyalist) =

Northern Irish Protestant paramilitary

- Born: William McFarland
- Military career
- Allegiance: Ulster Defence Association (UDA)
- Rank: Brigadier
- Units: North Antrim and Londonderry Brigade
- Conflict: The Troubles

William McFarland, also known as "the Mexican", is a Northern Irish loyalist paramilitary leader. He was a leading figure in the Ulster Defence Association (UDA), he had served as head of the North Antrim and Londonderry East Tyrone Brigade of the group.

== Early years ==
McFarland joined the UDA in the 1970s and for a time was active in a series of bomb attacks on Catholic-owned businesses in the North Antrim and County Londonderry area, activities for which he was eventually imprisoned. Around this time he was given the nickname "the Mexican" on account of his swarthy appearance and his thick moustache.

== Brigadier ==
Following his release from prison, McFarland, who also maintained legitimate business interests in the construction industry, was appointed brigadier for the North Antrim and Londonderry area, a brigade that was only sporadically active compared to those in Belfast. McFarland's brigade published its own magazine, Warrior, that spoke out against gangsterism and drug dealing and which also invited readers to send in their own ideas for the future of Northern Ireland which the magazine would then publish, something of a departure for the usually dogmatic UDA.

McFarland's brigade was responsible for the Castlerock killings of 25 March 1993 in which four Catholics were killed. The Greysteel massacre of 30 October 1993 also happened within McFarland's brigade area and he was widely suspected of having ordered the attack, although suspicion also fell on West Belfast brigadier Johnny Adair who, even at this stage, was seeking to extend his influence beyond his own area. Although McFarland's brigade was fairly active during this period, Adair had little respect for his fellow brigadier, considering him to be a "redneck" due to his rural origins. Adair was also critical of McFarland for the latter's alleged paranoia over the Ulster Volunteer Force (UVF) as that group was highly active in McFarland's area of command. Nevertheless, court documents released in late 2013 named McFarland as the brains behind the attack.

In early 1994, the UDA's Inner Council, which was in charge of directing operations, was made up of its six brigadiers – McFarland, Adair, Alex Kerr of the South Belfast Brigade, Tom Reid for North Belfast, Gary Matthews for East Belfast, and Joe English for Southeast Antrim who served as chairman. English was an advocate of a Combined Loyalist Military Command (CLMC) ceasefire and sought to win support from his fellow brigadiers. Whilst Reid and Matthews were supportive of this initiative and Adair wholly opposed, McFarland represented, along with Kerr, a middle ground that, whilst largely sympathetic to English also felt that Adair's main argument, that a recent upturn in UDA activity was defeating the Provisional IRA, had some merit.

In 1996, following the end of the IRA ceasefire, McFarland converted to the Ulster nationalism previously advocated by the late South Belfast brigadier John McMichael. He called for the United Kingdom to be radically altered into a "British family of nations" in which Northern Ireland, Scotland, Wales and England would all become fully self-governing and only loosely linked. Acknowledging that his independent "Ulster" would face the problem of an "Irish minority" McFarland argued that those who did not accept the new arrangement would be expected to move to the Republic of Ireland.

== Power struggle ==
Along with fellow brigadiers and Inner Council members Jackie McDonald (who had regained his former position as South Belfast brigadier) and John Gregg, McFarland was unenthusiastic about the Belfast Agreement, with the three especially irked by the prospect of Sinn Féin entering the proposed power-sharing executive. Surprisingly Johnny Adair, under the influence of John White, became for a time a supporter of the Northern Ireland peace process and in December 1999, after a meeting with Independent International Commission on Decommissioning chairman General John de Chastelain, announced that he felt the UDA should unilaterally decommission part of its arsenal. McFarland criticised the proposal and the Inner Council vote produced a three votes to three tie. At a second meeting the following day, called at Adair's behest, the West Belfast brigadier did not attend but rather sent John White to read out a statement in which Adair attacked the other five brigadiers, denouncing McFarland as "a dinosaur with no forward thinking". McFarland then refused to attend a press conference that Adair had called to announce decommissioning, telling White "I'm going back to Jurassic Park".

McFarland was one of those to caution against any UDA involvement in the feud between the Ulster Volunteer Force (UVF) and Loyalist Volunteer Force (LVF) and he feared that Adair's open support of the LVF would provoke an unwanted war between the UVF and the UDA. Nonetheless he was not keen to antagonise the widely feared Adair and so, along with Gregg, McDonald and North Belfast brigadier Jimbo Simpson, attended Adair's "Loyalist Day of Culture" on the Lower Shankill on 19 August 2000. Unbeknownst to McFarland and the others, Adair would use this day to launch his assault on the UVF with members of Adair's C Company attacking the UVF's Rex Bar stronghold before forcing UVF members and their families out of the Lower Shankill and initiating a loyalist feud between the UVF and the UDA West Belfast Brigade. McFarland had known that trouble was brewing as soon as the UDA march began that day, as a west Belfast band asked to march with his brigade but he refused after noticing an LVF flag amongst their banners.

Despite the earlier troubles McFarland, after a request from White, accompanied the other four brigadiers to publicly meet and greet Adair on the Shankill after he had been released from Maghaberry on 15 May 2002. McFarland later stated that he didn't want to go but had only agreed after the other brigadiers accepted White's argument that it was important to show unity publicly after a series of press reports about splits in the UDA. In the subsequent fall-out, McFarland backed McDonald in his move against Adair.

== Subsequent activity ==
During February 2003 various reports appeared in the press regarding McFarland's status as brigadier. It was firstly claimed that McFarland was to be replaced as brigadier by Torrens Knight before being subsequently claimed that McFarland faced replacement by an anonymous figure as the UDA wished to end the practice of making its leaders public. Ultimately neither story proved true, not least because Knight had left the UDA, and McFarland remained as brigadier. In 2006, McFarland was one of three leading UDA men, the others being Jackie McDonald and Ihab Shoukri, to meet with Martin McAleese in Belfast to discuss decommissioning.

In 2009 McFarland was at the centre of reports about a split in the UDA over the issue of decommissioning. The Belfast brigadiers met with General de Chastelaine in a separate meeting to one conducted with McFarland. This came after the Ulster Political Research Group in McFarland's area announced unilaterally that it was abandoning its previous support for the Police Service of Northern Ireland and the Northern Ireland Assembly. McFarland subsequently told the other brigadiers at an Inner Council meeting that he could not deliver decommissioning as the strength of feeling within his brigade was too set against the move.

During Queen Elizabeth II's visit to the Republic of Ireland in 2011 McFarland was part of a delegation of UDA brigadiers who laid a wreath at the National War Memorial in Dublin.

== Removal as Brigadier ==
In May 2013 McFarland was removed from his position within the UDA and is no longer a brigadier. McFarland reportedly was summoned to the Waterside area of Derry and informed of numerous complaints made against him and his leadership. The complaints included mismanagement of UDA funds, dealings with Irish republicans and accepting protection money from expelled members from the UDA. The Coleraine commander of the brigade was alleged to have been instrumental in having McFarland removed from power. The brigade area had garnered a reputation for growing criminality; the Ballymoney UDA were heavily involved in the selling of illegal cigarettes and tobacco, whilst the Derry UDA were reported in the Sunday World as being involved with local drug dealers by accepting bribes in order to turn a blind eye to the dealers' activities.

In contrast to a number of similar dismissals within the UDA, McFarland accepted the decision and was allowed to continue to live in the area and to remain as an ordinary member of the UDA. However subsequent to his removal, the Brigade split into several factions, with no new brigadier nominated.

In 2015 it was reported that there was a call for McFarland to return as Brigadier. Disillusioned members in the North Antrim and Londonderry brigade reportedly had become dismayed with a growing criminal element within the organisation and believed the return of McFarland would stabilise the group. Alleged activity which prompted this included extortion of drug dealers, members previously expelled for criminality returning to the UDA and the killing of a man in Ballymoney which was only intended to be a punishment beating. However powerlifter Kyle Vauls, formerly the commander of the UDA in Coleraine, has subsequently emerged as brigadier; both remain in charge as of 2017.

== See also ==
- Directory of the Northern Ireland Troubles
