= Traditional Unionist Voice =

Political party in Northern Ireland

- Abbreviation: TUV
- Leader: Jim Allister
- Chairman: Allister Kyle
- President: William Ross
- Deputy Leader: Ron McDowell
- Founded: 7 December 2007; 18 years ago
- Split from: Democratic Unionist Party
- Headquarters: 38 Henry Street, Ballymena, Northern Ireland
- Ideology: British unionism; National conservatism; Social conservatism; Anti-Good Friday Agreement; Hard Euroscepticism
- Political position: Right-wing
- Great Britain affiliate: Reform UK (alliance)
- Colours: Blue (primarily), red and white
- House of Commons (NI Seats): 1 / 18
- NI Assembly: 1 / 90
- Local government in Northern Ireland: 10 / 462

Website
- www.tuv.org.uk

The Traditional Unionist Voice (TUV) is a right-wing unionist political party in Northern Ireland. In common with all other Northern Irish unionist parties, the TUV's political programme has as its sine qua non the preservation of Northern Ireland's place within the United Kingdom. A founding precept of the party is that "nothing which is morally wrong can be politically right".

== History ==
The TUV was formed in December 2007 by Jim Allister after he and others had resigned from the Democratic Unionist Party (DUP) in March of that year. At the time of his resignation, Allister was a prominent figure in the DUP and held the position of Member of the European Parliament (MEP) for the party having been elected to the European Parliament in 2004. The reason for the split was DUP leader Ian Paisley's March 2007 consent to the St Andrews Agreement and his willingness to become First Minister of Northern Ireland alongside a deputy First Minister from the Irish republican party Sinn Féin.

Prior to the St Andrews Agreement, the DUP had presented itself as an 'anti-Agreement' unionist party opposed to numerous aspects of the Good Friday Agreement, e.g., the release of paramilitary prisoners before the end of their jail sentences, and the participation of Sinn Féin in the Northern Ireland government without complete decommissioning of Provisional Irish Republican Army (IRA) weapons and cessation of all IRA activity. The TUV has been an exception among Northern Irish unionist parties in consistently opposing the presence of Sinn Féin in the Northern Ireland government. After Allister's resignation from the DUP, he continued to occupy his European Parliament seat, sitting as an independent MEP until the following European election in 2009 when he was not re-elected.

In terms of electoral success and financial income, Traditional Unionist Voice is the third largest unionist party in Northern Ireland, behind the Democratic Unionist Party and the Ulster Unionist Party (UUP). It is usually considered by political commentators to be a small party and characterised as being more hardline than other Northern Irish unionist parties.

Since 2011, the TUV has occupied one seat in the Northern Ireland Assembly. In 2024, they won their first seat in the United Kingdom House of Commons. The party also holds some seats on local councils in Northern Ireland. Its most prominent elected representative and best-known figure remains Jim Allister whose North Antrim constituency is the heartland of the party.

Since 2008, the party president has been former East Londonderry Westminster MP William Ross.

Reform UK - TUV alliance

In March 2024, the party formed an electoral pact with Reform UK, stating that the two parties would stand mutually agreed candidates in Northern Ireland constituencies in the 2024 United Kingdom general election. In this election, the party won its first Westminster Member of Parliament (MP), electing Jim Allister as MP for North Antrim.

== Ideology and votes of elected representatives ==
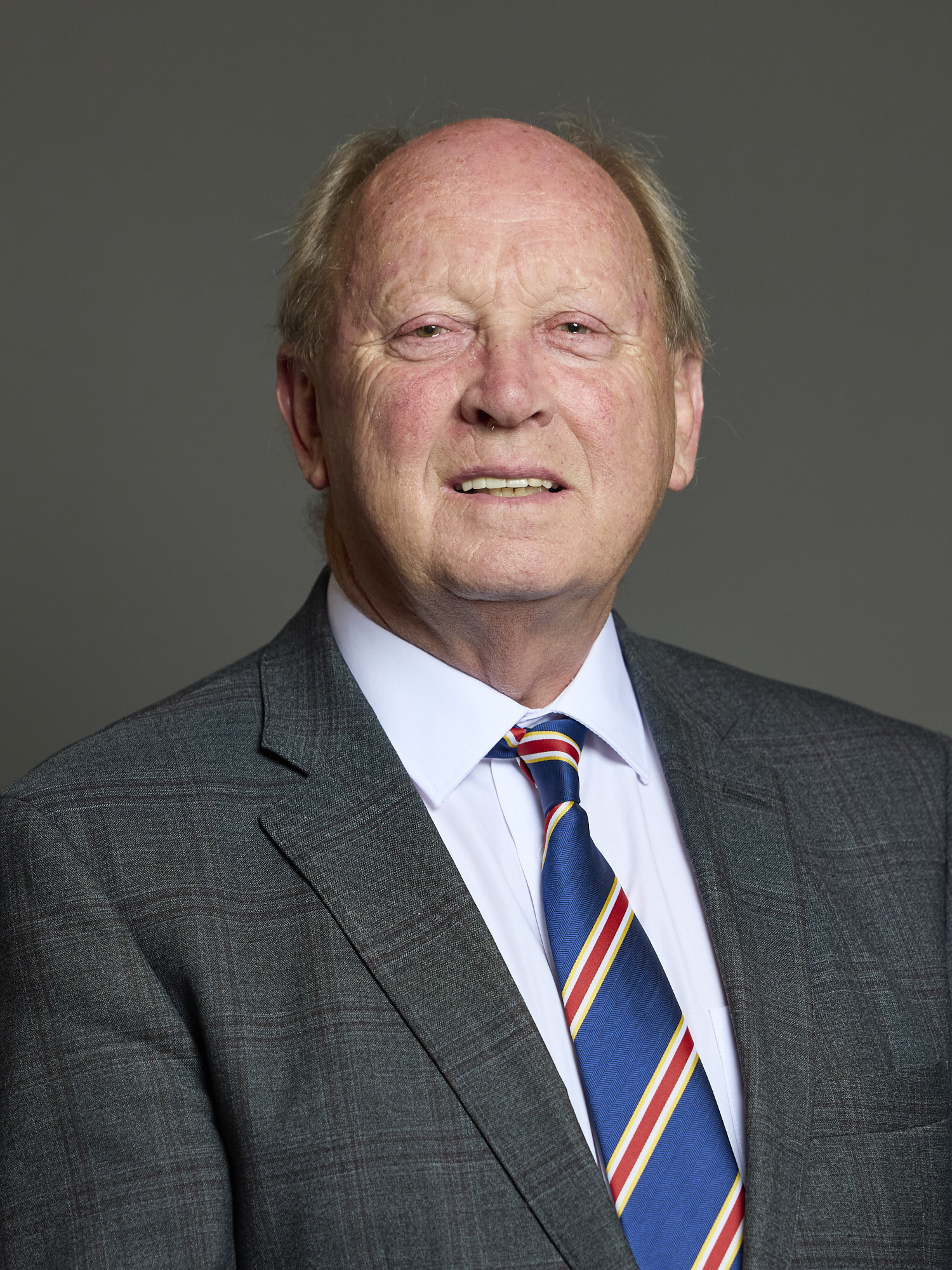
The TUV's leader, Jim Allister, in 2024

The Traditional Unionist Voice was founded in 2007 as a protest movement rather than as a political party. They announced that it was their intention to "occupy the traditional unionist ground" which, they said, had been abandoned by the DUP when the latter party signed the St Andrews Agreement and agreed to form a government with the Irish Republican party Sinn Féin. In 2008, the TUV began to contest elections as a political party with the declared aim of building a democratic opposition to what they described as "the DUP/Sinn Fein regime". The TUV maintains that certain aspects of the Good Friday Agreement represent a poor deal for the unionist community of Northern Ireland, and refuse to accept that someone with a terrorist conviction should be allowed to hold ministerial office in the government of Northern Ireland.

Jim Allister had been the party's sole MLA since 2011 until he was elected to the House of Commons in the 2024 general election; after being elected, he was replaced by Timothy Gaston. Allister's voting record, his contributions to debates and a list of bills he has proposed in the Northern Ireland Assembly are accessible on the Assembly's Information Management portal.

The TUV focuses most of its energies upon matters relating to the unionist/nationalist political cleavage which has dominated Northern Ireland politics since 1921. Its policies on matters beyond the Northern Ireland constitutional question can be described as right-wing and socially conservative, and they emphasise a strong attachment to "traditional family values". The party opposes euthanasia, abortion, and what it calls "the dilution of marriage".

Most of the policies in the following list can be found in all TUV election manifestos since 2009.

=== Economic policy ===
The TUV advocates an economically liberal, low taxation economy, with as much freedom of choice to small businesses as possible. They prefer that government should run a balanced budget and have been consistently critical of what they call 'Stormont Squander' of tax revenues.

The TUV want to cut corporation tax from 25% to 15% over three years.

=== Climate change ===
The TUV has emphasised a continuing place for fossil fuels/hydrocarbon energy as a part of the energy mix for the economy but also support development of renewable energy sources. They believe there is a need for local recycling facilities. They see farmers as "custodians of the land" who have a part to play in the long-term conservation of the natural world. In 2022, the TUV voted against a target of net zero emissions by 2050.

=== Euthanasia and assisted dying ===
The TUV opposes euthanasia. In June 2025, party leader and the party's only MP in the House of Commons of the United Kingdom, Jim Allister, voted against the legalisation of assisted dying.

=== Abortion law ===
The TUV opposed the introduction of The Abortion (Northern Ireland) Regulations 2020 which substantially expanded the grounds wherein abortion could be demanded. The party holds a "pro-life" position. The TUV reaffirmed its opposition to abortion in its 2024 UK general election manifesto.

=== Same-sex marriage ===
In the TUV's 2015 manifesto (before the legalisation of same-sex marriage in Northern Ireland in January 2020) it stated that it, "oppose[s] any redefinition of marriage" and "defend[s] traditional family values ... believing that that is the bedrock for the success of society". As of 2024, the party is still against same-sex marriage.

=== Immigration ===
The TUV advocates a controlled-immigration approach with effective border checks and a 'points-style' application procedure whereby preference is given to prospective immigrants having skillsets which are in demand in Northern Ireland. The TUV has said that it agrees with Reform UK's policies on migration.

=== Education ===
Their position is that academic selection (grammar schools) should remain an option within the education system for those children whose abilities are suited to it but that all types of secondary school must be given equal priority in funding.

=== Health ===
The TUV opposed closure of residential care homes which had been operated by the NHS and they supported the retention of a mix of public and private sector residential care home provision. They believe that when there is a public inquiry into the response to COVID-19 pandemic in Northern Ireland, a key element should be the question of whether care homes were sufficiently protected from the virus. The TUV opposed mandatory vaccine passports and argued that the Northern Ireland government was too cautious in easing lockdown restrictions and that Northern Irish schools should have re-opened sooner than they did.

=== Human rights ===
The TUV wants the UK to leave the European Convention on Human Rights.

=== Brexit ===
The TUV strongly supported Brexit. Their grounds for doing so included an opposition to fiscal transfers from the UK to the European Union and what they described as the subordination of local labour market, trade and other laws to the supremacy of EU law. They wish to see the Northern Ireland Protocol annulled.

=== Localism: referendum on council rates ===
The TUV's Council Election manifesto of 2023 proposed that any local council wishing to increase rates by more than 5% should first seek approval for this from voters who would be asked to approve or to veto the rise via local referendum. The party suggested that this would help "deliver value for money" in local councils. The Localism Act 2011 had already introduced such a statutory obligation in England: since when, only one English local council has proposed a rate rise above the statutory limit (Bedfordshire council in 2015) but the proposed rates increase was overwhelmingly rejected by voters in the subsequent local referendum.

=== Power sharing ===
A salient difference between the TUV and the other Northern Irish unionist parties is the TUV's consistent opposition to the arrangements for formation of government in Northern Ireland as prescribed by the Good Friday Agreement and the subsequent St Andrews Agreement.

Northern Irish governments are formed via a type of consociationalist power-sharing termed 'mandatory coalition', and the government ministers who make up the Northern Ireland Executive are overseen by two first ministers. In practice this has meant that one first minister is appointed from among the unionist parties in the Assembly and the other first minister from among the Irish nationalist parties. Furthermore, ministerial roles in the Northern Ireland Executive are apportioned (via the D'Hondt mathematical formula) to political parties according to their respective strengths in the Assembly. The TUV argues that these arrangements are not in the best interests of Northern Ireland because such a government will always consist of parties having political objectives which are opposites, and thus no common programme for government can be agreed upon. The TUV would prefer to see the formation of government via the 'voluntary coalition' model which operates in most democratic countries. Voluntary coalition allows for any group of parties in an Assembly to form a government provided that they can agree on a programme for government and can command a majority in the Assembly. In the event that no voluntary coalition could be negotiated, the TUV would prefer that Northern Ireland be governed from Westminster while retaining the Assembly and its associated committees - so-called 'legislative devolution'.

== Election history ==
=== Local by-elections ===
The party's first electoral contest was the Dromore local government by-election for Banbridge District Council which took place on 13 February 2008 with its candidate being Dromore solicitor, Keith Harbinson. He took 19.5% of the first preference votes cast.

TUV was the last party to be eliminated, and more of its votes transferred to the Ulster Unionist Party (UUP) than to the Democratic Unionist Party (DUP), enabling the former to retain its seat.

At a Craigavon Borough Council local by-election in Lurgan on 14 January 2010, the TUV candidate won 19.3% of first preference votes. The UUP candidate, Jo-Anne Dobson, won with 63.9%. The DUP did not contest the seat.

=== 2009 European Parliament election ===
Jim Allister, leader of TUV, contested the European Parliament election on 4 June 2009. He stood on a ticket of opposition to the DUP/Sinn Féin-led Northern Ireland Executive. The election turned out to be hotly contested, with the unionist vote split three ways. Sinn Féin's sitting MEP Bairbre de Brún topped the poll (a first for any Irish nationalist or republican candidate). The Ulster Conservative and Unionist candidate Jim Nicholson took the second seat, with Diane Dodds of the DUP coming in third place. TUV polled 66,000 votes. Jim Allister called the results a victory for unionism and indicated his intention to stand TUV candidates in future Northern Ireland Assembly and parliamentary elections. He additionally argued that the election represented the "depth of feeling that there is among many unionists who refuse to be rolled over in the era of Sinn Féin rule, who have quite rightly a resentment against those who betrayed them, deceived them, conned them, in the assembly election."

| Party | Candidate | Seats | Loss/gain | First preference votes | | Seat |
| Party | Candidate | Seats | Loss/gain | Number | % of vote | Seat |
|---|---|---|---|---|---|---|
| Sinn Féin | Bairbre de Brún | 1 | 0 | 126,184 | 25.8 | 1st |
| DUP | Diane Dodds | 1 | 0 | 88,346 | 18.1 | 3rd |
| UCU-NF | Jim Nicholson | 1 | 0 | 82,892 | 17.0 | 2nd |
| SDLP | Alban Maginness | 0 | 0 | 78,489 | 16.1 | |
| TUV | Jim Allister | 0 | 0 | 66,197 | 13.5 | |
| Alliance | Ian Parsley | 0 | 0 | 26,699 | 5.5 | |
| Green (NI) | Steven Agnew | 0 | 0 | 15,764 | 3.2 | |
| Turnout | | | | 488,891 | 42.8 | |

Source: RTÉ News

=== 2010 United Kingdom general election ===
On 6 May at the 2010 general election for the Westminster parliament, TUV received 26,300 votes in the 10 constituencies it contested. In the same election, the DUP received 168,216 votes and the UCUNF received 102,361 votes. A week after the election the TUV acknowledged on its website that the outcome was disappointing given that none of its candidates were elected to Parliament.

| Constituency | Candidate | Votes | % | Position |
|---|---|---|---|---|
| Belfast East | David Vance | 1,856 | 5.4 | 4 |
| East Antrim | Sammy Morrison | 1,826 | 6.0 | 6 |
| East Londonderry | William Ross | 2,572 | 7.4 | 5 |
| Lagan Valley | Keith Harbinson | 3,154 | 8.6 | 4 |
| Mid Ulster | Walter Millar | 2,995 | 7.3 | 5 |
| North Antrim | Jim Allister | 7,114 | 16.8 | 2 |
| North Down | Kaye Kilpatrick | 1,634 | 4.9 | 4 |
| South Antrim | Mel Lucas | 1,829 | 5.4 | 6 |
| South Down | Ivor McConnell | 1,506 | 3.5 | 5 |
| Strangford | Terry Williams | 1,814 | 5.6 | 5 |

=== 2011 council elections ===
Traditional Unionist Voice fielded 41 candidates in the 2011 Northern Ireland local elections. It received 2% of the overall vote. Two TUV candidates were elected in Ballymena, and one each in Moyle, Ballymoney, Larne and Limavady.

=== 2011 Northern Ireland Assembly election ===
The TUV fielded 12 candidates across 11 constituencies in the 2011 Northern Ireland Assembly election. They received 16,480 votes or 2.5% of the poll. Just one of their candidates was elected; Jim Allister in the North Antrim constituency, thus becoming the party's first MLA. Allister received 4,061 first preference votes (10.1%), and on the ninth and last count was deemed to be elected without reaching the quota of 5,760 votes.

=== 2014 European Parliament election ===
In the 2014 European Parliament election, Jim Allister once again contested the Northern Ireland constituency for the TUV. On this occasion he polled 75,806 first preference votes, 12.1% of the total. This represented a large increase in number of votes compared to his 2009 European election score, although a decrease of just over one percentage point in terms of vote share. Allister was eliminated in the sixth of eight counts with Sinn Féin, the DUP and UUP all retaining their seats.

=== 2014 council elections ===
In the 2014 Northern Ireland local elections (held on the same day as the European election) for the 11 new local councils in Northern Ireland, TUV candidates polled a total of 28,310 first preference votes, or 4.5%, an increase on the previous council elections. The party had 13 successful candidates. They achieved their largest number of councillors in Mid and East Antrim, where they became the third-largest party with five seats. They won three seats in Causeway Coast and Glens, two in Antrim and Newtownabbey and one each in Belfast, North Down and Ards and Lisburn and Castlereagh.

=== 2015 United Kingdom general election ===
The party stood in seven constituencies in the 2015 general election, taking second in North Antrim but failing to place in the top four elsewhere.

| Constituency | Candidate | Votes | % | Position |
|---|---|---|---|---|
| East Antrim | Ruth Wilson | 1,903 | 5.7 | 6 |
| Lagan Valley | Samuel Morrison | 1,887 | 4.7 | 6 |
| Mid Ulster | Gareth Ferguson | 1,892 | 4.6 | 5 |
| North Antrim | Timothy Gaston | 6,561 | 15.7 | 2 |
| North Down | William Cudworth | 686 | 1.9 | 7 |
| South Antrim | Rick Cairns | 1,908 | 5.2 | 6 |
| Strangford | Stephen Cooper | 1,701 | 5.1 | 7 |

=== 2016 Northern Ireland Assembly election ===
The party stood 15 candidates in 14 constituencies in the 2016 Northern Ireland Assembly election, winning 23,776 first-preference votes (3.4% of the overall vote share). Jim Allister retained his seat in North Antrim, but the party was unable to gain any additional MLAs.

| Constituency | Candidate | Votes | % | Position (after transfers) |
|---|---|---|---|---|
| Belfast East | Andrew Girvin | 887 | 3.7 | 12 |
| Belfast North | John Miller | 644 | 1.8 | 13 |
| Belfast South | John Andrew Hiddleston | 495 | 1.3 | 12 |
| East Antrim | Ruth Wilson | 1,643 | 5.1 | 10 |
| East Londonderry | Jordon Armstrong | 1,191 | 3.5 | 11 |
| Fermanagh and South Tyrone | Donald Crawford | 1,164 | 2.5 | 10 |
| Lagan Valley | Lyle Rea | 1,291 | 3.3 | 10 |
| Mid Ulster | Hanna Loughrin | 1,877 | 4.6 | 8 |
| North Antrim | Jim Allister | 5,399 | 13.2 | 2 |
| North Antrim | Timothy Gaston | 1,955 | 4.8 | 9 |
| North Down | John Brennan | 610 | 1.9 | 12 |
| South Antrim | Rick Cairns | 1,318 | 3.8 | 10 |
| South Down | Henry Reilly | 2,718 | 6.6 | 10 |
| Strangford | Stephen Cooper | 1,407 | 4.3 | 10 |
| Upper Bann | Roy Ferguson | 1,177 | 2.6 | 10 |

=== 2017 Northern Ireland Assembly election ===
Jim Allister once again retained his North Antrim seat in the 2017 Northern Ireland Assembly election, taking 16% of first preference votes.

=== 2017 United Kingdom general election ===
In 2017, the party stood a single candidate in the 2017 general election.

| Constituency | Candidate | Votes | % | Position |
|---|---|---|---|---|
| North Antrim | Timothy Gaston | 3,282 | 6.8 | 4 |

=== 2019 United Kingdom general election ===
TUV did not stand any candidates in the 2019 general election.

=== 2022 Northern Ireland Assembly election ===
The TUV campaign for the 2022 Northern Ireland Assembly election prioritised a theme of opposition to the Northern Ireland Protocol. The party's candidates were designated on the ballot paper as representing "TUV - No Sea Border". For the first time in the party's history it stood a candidate in each of the 18 constituencies which elect the Northern Ireland Assembly.

TUV candidates won 65,788 first preference votes, more than three times the party's score in the 2017 Assembly election and 7.6% of the total first preference vote but only one of the 90 members elected to the new Northern Ireland Assembly was a TUV candidate; Jim Allister in the North Antrim constituency. Under the Single Transferable Vote system of proportional representation used in Northern Ireland a disproportionality between outcome in seats and first preference vote share can arise when a party is eliminated from the count because it has been less successful at obtaining lower preference votes on the ballot paper than at obtaining first preference votes.

Summary of results for the NI Assembly election of May 2022
| Party | Seats | Seats ± | First preference votes | | |
| Party | Seats | Seats ± | Number | % of vote | Votes in 2017 |
|---|---|---|---|---|---|
| Sinn Féin | 27 | 0 | 250,388 | 29.02% | 224,245 |
| Democratic Unionist Party | 25 | −3 | 184,002 | 21.33% | 225,413 |
| Alliance Party of Northern Ireland | 17 | +9 | 116,681 | 13.53% | 72,717 |
| Ulster Unionist Party | 9 | −1 | 96,390 | 11.17% | 103,314 |
| Social Democratic and Labour Party | 8 | −4 | 78,237 | 9.07% | 95,958 |
| Independent | 2 | +1 | 25,315 | 2.93% | 14,407 |
| Traditional Unionist Voice | 1 | 0 | 65,788 | 7.63% | 20,523 |
| People Before Profit | 1 | 0 | 9,798 | 1.14% | 14,100 |
| Green Party Northern Ireland | 0 | −2 | 16,433 | 1.90% | 18,527 |
| Aontú | 0 | 0 | 12,777 | 1.48% | * |
| Others | 0 | 0 | 6,894 | 0.8% | 14,111 |
| Total | 90 | * | 862,703 | 100% | * |

Source: Ulster University CAIN archive

Results by constituency for TUV candidates in the NI Assembly election of May 2022
| Constituency | Candidate | First pref. votes | % | Votes at elimination | Count eliminated |
|---|---|---|---|---|---|
| Belfast East | John Ross | 3,087 | 7.1 | 3,426.32 | 10th |
| Belfast North | Ron McDowell | 3,335 | 7.2 | 4,261.41 | 10th |
| Belfast South | Andrew Girvin | 1,935 | 4.1 | 1,979.9 | 4th |
| Belfast West | Jordan Doran | 802 | 1.8 | 918.38 | 7th |
| East Antrim | Norman Boyd | 3,661 | 9.1 | 4,467.30 | 5th |
| East Londonderry | Jordan Armstrong | 2,959 | 6.7 | 3,737 | 7th |
| Fermanagh & South Tyrone | Alex Elliott | 3,091 | 5.8 | 3,351.06 | 5th |
| Foyle | Elizabeth Neely | 499 | 1.1 | 501.84 | 4th |
| Lagan Valley | Lorna Smyth | 3,488 | 6.8 | 4,575.8 | 6th |
| Mid Ulster | Glenn Moore | 3,818 | 7.4 | 5,365 | 8th |
| Newry and Armagh | Keith Ratcliffe | 5,407 | 9.2 | 6,892 | 5th |
| North Antrim | Jim Allister | 8,282 | 16.4 | 8,625.99 | 5th (elected) |
| North Antrim | Matthew Armstrong | 2,481 | 4.9 | 2,726.27 | 5th |
| North Down | John Gordon | 1,574 | 3.8 | 2,098.1 | 7th |
| South Antrim | Mel Lucas | 4,371 | 9.6 | 4,660.85 | 4th |
| South Down | Harold McKee | 3,273 | 6.0 | 4,117.97 | 5th |
| Strangford | Stephen Cooper | 5,186 | 12.7 | 5,924.01 | 9th |
| Upper Bann | Darrin Foster | 4,373 | 7.8 | 4,626 | 4th |
| West Tyrone | Trevor Clarke | 4,166 | 9.1 | 4,884.55 | 7th |

=== 2023 council elections ===
In the Northern Ireland local council elections held on 18 May 2023, the TUV fielded 46 candidates and polled a total of 29,202 first preference votes, 3.9% of all votes cast in the election. Nine of their candidates were elected: five in Mid and East Antrim Borough Council, two in Causeway Coast and Glens Borough Council, one in Armagh, Banbridge and Craigavon Borough Council and one in Belfast City Council.

In March 2024, a Carrickfergus councillor, David Clarke, joined the TUV after leaving the DUP over "bullying" he had allegedly faced in the party.

=== 2024 United Kingdom general election ===
On 4 July at the 2024 general election for the Westminster parliament, TUV leader Jim Allister was elected Member of Parliament (MP) for North Antrim. This is the first time the TUV has gained an MP seat at Westminster.

== Controversies ==
In November 2009 the TUV issued a press release whose title included the phrase "leprechaun language" in reference to the Irish language. The press release's content censured the Northern Ireland Department of Education for an annual increase of 350% in spending on translation from English into the Irish language (the total sum spent on translation was £47,000, according to the party). Although the press release was issued under the name of the then TUV vice-chairman Keith Harbinson, he insisted that the phrase was not his own but had instead been added by another, unnamed, employee of the party. When eventually published on the TUV website, the phrase was removed from the title and both Harbinson and the TUV apologised to their critics for its use.

In December 2009, TUV member Trevor Collins organised a petition to release former Ulster Freedom Fighters (UFF) member Torrens Knight from prison, where he was serving a sentence for assaulting two women. Knight had previously served seven years imprisonment for taking part in the Greysteel massacre and Castlerock killings, but had been released early (in 2000) under the terms of the Good Friday Agreement. Because of his new conviction, the early release licence for his terrorist crimes was suspended. The TUV distanced itself from the petition, but was criticised for refusing to take action against Collins. Jim Allister replied that Collins had "acted in a misguided fashion" but said "there are people released from jail who were convicted of crimes in which people died and today they sit in our government".

In November 2012, Ballymena Borough TUV councillor and former player for the Ireland national rugby union team, Davy Tweed, was convicted of child sexual abuse between 1988 and 1995. Pending sentencing, he remained a TUV councillor. TUV stated that the sex offences related "to a period long before he was a member of this party". In January 2013, Tweed was sentenced to eight years' imprisonment. TUV chose one of its unsuccessful 2011 candidates, Timothy Gaston, to replace Tweed as councillor. Tweed's conviction was overturned in 2016 after a challenge by his lawyers on grounds that there were "flaws in how bad character evidence was put before the jury".

In 2014, Jolene Bunting became the first TUV councillor elected to Belfast City Council. It was then reported that she had posted sectarian "rants" against Catholics in 2011–2012. Bunting apologised for the online comments. She said that she did not regret their content, but regretted how they were written. In 2017, Bunting resigned from the TUV, claiming that party officials would not allow her to stand again for the party in North Belfast because of these past sectarian posts. The TUV issued a statement saying that to give its candidates the "best chance of success" the party must "take tough decisions". Bunting remained on Belfast City Council as an independent member until the 2019 Belfast City Council election when, standing this time as an independent candidate, she received 3% of first preference votes and was not re-elected to the council.

In August 2021, the TUV defended its Assembly candidate for East Belfast, John Ross, who was criticised by the Bloody Sunday Trust (a registered charity) for comments he made about Bloody Sunday (1972), when 14 unarmed Catholic civilians were shot dead by the Parachute Regiment. In April 2019, while addressing a protest for British Army veterans, Ross had called Bloody Sunday "a very successful operation" by the paratroopers. The demonstration was part of UK-wide protests against Troubles-related prosecutions of former British soldiers. The chair of the Trust said: "Bloody Sunday has been the subject of a meticulous public inquiry which found that all those killed and wounded were innocent" and asked TUV to re-consider whether Ross was a suitable candidate. The TUV replied that there had been "various conflicting judicial findings" about Bloody Sunday. It also said Ross's words had been taken out of context and that he would remain their candidate.

== Leader ==
| Leader | | Born | Term start | Term end |
|---|---|---|---|---|
| 1 | Jim Allister | 1953 | 7 December 2007 | Incumbent |
