= Torrens Knight =

Northern Ireland loyalist (born 1969)

- Born: 4 August 1969 (age 56)
- Organization: Ulster Defence Association
- Movement: Northern Ireland loyalist
- Criminal charges: Greysteel massacre, Castlerock killings
- Criminal penalty: 12 life sentences, Maze Prison
- Criminal status: Released after seven years, part of Good Friday Agreement

Robert Torrens Knight (born 4 August 1969) is a Northern Ireland loyalist, who belonged to the North Antrim and Londonderry Brigade of the Ulster Defence Association (UDA). In 1993 he took part in two mass murders in County Londonderry: the Greysteel massacre (in which eight civilians were shot dead) and the Castlerock killings (in which three civilians and a Provisional Irish Republican Army (IRA) member were killed). After being convicted — along with three others — for the killings, he served seven years in the Maze Prison before his release in 2000 under the terms of the Good Friday Agreement.

== Early life ==
Knight spent his formative years living at his grandmother's farmhouse in the rural area of Aghadowey, County Londonderry, after his parents separated. In early adulthood he developed an addiction to poker gambling machines, which resulted in his exposure of stealing money from his grandmother to fund his habit. As a result of this, he was asked to leave the home and moved to the town of Portstewart, County Londonderry. Living with a loyalist, he started drinking alcohol and involving himself with criminality.

== Paramilitary activity ==
His initial starting point within loyalism was selling a magazine for a loyalist prisoners' association. He progressed to the ranks of the UDA and carried out acts like robberies and punishment beatings. Knight was part of a four-man UDA group sent to conduct an attack in revenge for the Shankill Road bombing. Their target was the Rising Sun bar in Greysteel, where Knight, Stephen Irwin, Jeffrey Deeney and Brian McNeill shot eight dead (six Catholics and two Protestants). After the leading gunman, Irwin shouted "trick or treat", he and Deeney raked the bar with gunfire, while Knight, armed with a shotgun, stood at the door. A total of 19 other people were injured. McNeill was the driver of one of the cars used after the shootings. The attack was claimed by the "Ulster Freedom Fighters" (UFF), a cover name used by the UDA.

Knight was given eight life sentences for his part in the Greysteel killings and a further four more for the killings in Castlerock. He served seven years in the Maze Prison before paramilitary prisoners were granted a general release under the Good Friday Agreement in 2000.

== Allegations of being an informant ==
According to David McKittrick, there had been rumours that Knight had been a police informer. Suspicions have been voiced by John Dallat, a member of the nationalist Social Democratic and Labour Party (SDLP). Dallat, who said he was in touch with police about Knight before the attacks in Greysteel and Castlerock, claimed they might have been prevented since it was known Knight was an extremist.

In 2000 Knight attracted the attention of staff at a bank where he was withdrawing large amounts of money from an account into which £50,000 a year was being paid. The bank's concern was that Knight was involved in money laundering, but, when police were contacted, an assurance was given that everything was in order. The money was said to be from a Scottish engineering firm, but the account was quickly closed down.

Police ombudsman Nuala O'Loan investigated Dallat's claim that police had prior information about Greysteel, stating that there was no evidence this was the case. She also stated that Knight's conviction and sentence led her to believe that he was not being protected by police, but added that it was beyond her remit to investigate whether or not he was a paid informer.

== Alleged membership of Apprentice Boys ==
In 2008 Sinn Féin councillor Billy Leonard claimed that Knight was a member of the Kilrea branch of the Apprentice Boys. It was claimed that Knight took part in a parade in Kilrea and laid a wreath at the cenotaph in the village. The Kilrea branch of the Apprentice Boys denied this, as did Knight himself. A spokesman stated that Knight was not a member and that they will demand an apology and explanation from Sinn Féin.

Knight also stated that John Dallat and Billy Leonard were taking part in a "hate campaign" against him and challenged the nationalist politicians "to get off his back".

== 2009 conviction ==
In October 2009, Knight was found guilty of assaulting two sisters in a bar in Coleraine. As a result, his early release licence was suspended and he was returned to jail.

He was later sentenced to four months in prison for the assault. The judge said "The injuries sustained were consistent with a vicious attack on the two women and of particular concern in this case is that you kicked Ms Nicholl while she was on the ground, prone and unable to defend herself.... People who do that can expect no mercy or sympathy from these courts. You acted as a bully when you approached these sisters. You lost control and lashed out".

After Knight was returned to prison in 2009 it was revealed that Trevor Collins, a member of Jim Allister's Traditional Unionist Voice political party from Garvagh, was collecting signatures campaigning for his release from prison. The TUV said it would not be taking action against Collins for instigating the petition.

Knight was released on 6 August 2010.
