= McQuiston =

McQuiston is a surname. Notable people with the surname include:

- Billy McQuiston (born 1950s), Irish loyalist, former high-ranking member of the Ulster Defence Association
- Casey McQuiston (born 1991), American author

== See also ==
- Andrew McQuistin (born c. 1960), Scottish curler
