= 1971 Balmoral Furniture Company bombing =

1971 terrorist attack in Belfast, Northern Ireland

1971 Balmoral Furniture Company bombing, Shankill
- Part of the Troubles
- Leading Ambulanceman Bob Scott removes the body of the youngest victim, Colin Nicholl, from under the rubble
- Location: Balmoral Furniture Company showroom, Lower Shankill Road, Belfast, Northern Ireland
- Date: 11 December 1971; 12.25 p.m.
- Attack type: Bombing
- Deaths: 4 civilians
- Injuries: 19

The Balmoral Furniture Company bombing was an attack that took place on 11 December 1971 on Shankill Road in Belfast, Northern Ireland, resulting in four deaths.

The bomb exploded without warning outside a furniture showroom on the Shankill Road in a predominantly unionist area, killing four civilians, two of them babies. It is believed that the bombing was carried out by members of the Provisional Irish Republican Army (IRA) in retaliation for the Ulster Volunteer Force (UVF) bombing of McGurk's Bar a week earlier, which killed 15 Catholic civilians.

The bombing happened on a Saturday when the Shankill was crowded with shoppers, creating bedlam in the area. Hundreds of people rushed to help British Army troops and the Royal Ulster Constabulary (RUC) rescue survivors trapped under the rubble of the devastated building. According to journalist Peter Taylor, the bomb site was "reminiscent of the London Blitz" during World War II. The attack provoked much anger in the tight-knit Ulster Protestant community and many men later cited the bombing as their reason for joining one of the two main Ulster loyalist paramilitary organisations: the illegal UVF or the then-legal Ulster Defence Association (UDA). Four such men were Tommy Lyttle, Michael Stone, Sammy Duddy, and Billy McQuiston.

Along with the earlier bombing of McGurk's bar by loyalists, the Balmoral Furniture Company bombing was one of the catalysts which sparked a series of tit-for-tat bombings and shootings by loyalists and republicans that made the 1970s the bloodiest decade in the 30-year history of the Troubles.

== The bombing ==
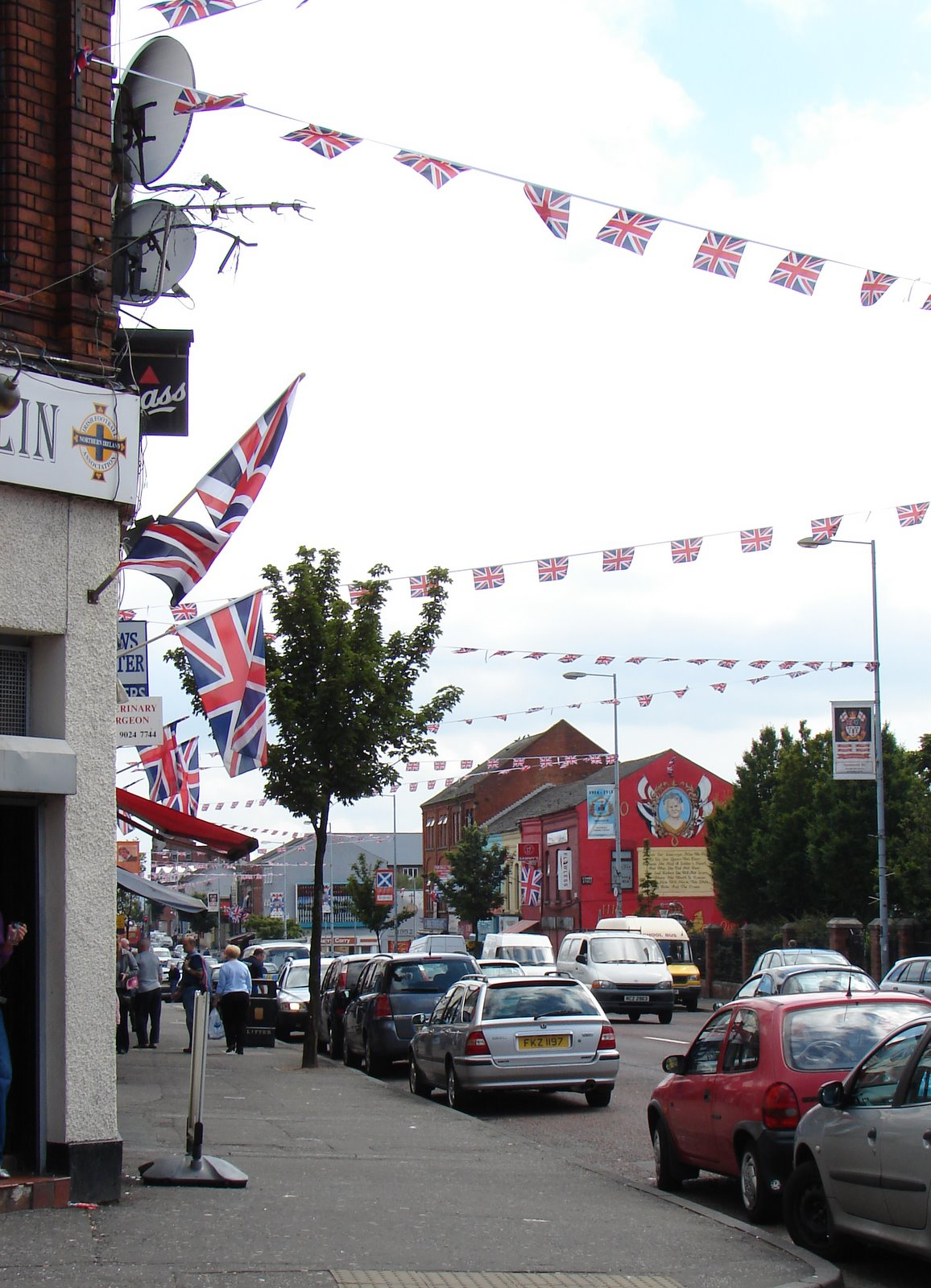
The bombing took place in the heart of the loyalist Shankill Road

At 12.25 pm on 11 December 1971, when the Shankill Road was packed with Saturday shoppers, a green car pulled up outside the Balmoral Furniture Company at the corner of Carlow Street and Shankill Road. The shop was locally known as "Moffat's" although Balmoral Furniture Company was its official name. One of the occupants got out, leaving a box containing a bomb on the step outside the front door. The person got back into the car and it sped away. The bomb exploded moments later, bringing down most of the building on top of those inside the shop and on passersby outside.

Four people were killed as a result of the massive blast, including two babies — two-year-old Tracey Munn and seventeen-month-old Colin Nichol — who both died instantly when part of the wall crashed down upon the pram they were sharing. Two employees working inside the shop were also killed: Hugh Bruce (70) and Harold King (29). Unlike the other three victims, who were Protestant, King was a Catholic. Bruce, a former soldier and a Corps of Commissionaires member, was the shop's doorman and nearest to the bomb when it exploded. Nineteen people were injured in the bombing, including Tracey's mother. The Victorian-era building had load-bearing walls supporting upper floors on joists. It was thus unable to withstand the blast and collapsed, adding to the devastation and injury count.

The bombing caused bedlam in the crowded street. Hundreds of people rushed to the scene where they formed human chains to help the British Army and RUC free those trapped beneath the rubble by digging with their bare hands. Peter Taylor described the scene as "reminiscent of the London Blitz" in World War II. One witness was Billy McQuiston, who had been walking down the Shankill with a friend when they heard the blast. Rushing to the scene, McQuiston later recounted what he saw and felt upon reaching the wrecked building:

Women were crying. Men were trying to dig out the rubble. Other men were hitting the walls. One person was crying beside you and the next person was shouting 'Bastards' and things like that. I didn't actually see the babies' bodies as they had them wrapped in sheets, but the blood was just coming right through them. They were just like lumps of meat, you know, small lumps of meat. All these emotions were going through you and you wanted to help. There were people shouting at the back, "Let's get something done about this". To be perfectly honest with you, I just stood there and cried, just totally and utterly numb. It wasn't until I got back home that I realised, this isn't a game. There's a war going on here. These people are trying to do us all in. They're trying to kill us all and they don't care who we are or what age we are. Because we're Protestants, they are going to kill us so we're going to have to do something here.

The angry crowd at the scene shared McQuiston's dismay and anger against the IRA, whom they automatically held responsible for the bombing. They also sought to retaliate against any Catholic they happened upon. A Protestant man nearby made a remark about the bombing, and someone who overheard it mistook the speaker for a Catholic and shouted out: "He's Catholic!" A mob of about one hundred men and women ran towards him and began kicking and punching him until he was left unconscious. It took the RUC and British troops half an hour to rescue him from his attackers.

== Aftermath ==
Although nobody claimed responsibility for the attack, the Provisional IRA was immediately and widely blamed. In his book Loyalists, Peter Taylor said that the Provisional IRA bombed Balmoral in retaliation for the McGurk's Bar bombing one week earlier, which had killed 15 Catholic civilians. This theory is supported by author Susan McKay. Billy McQuiston, along with many other Protestant men who had been on the Shankill at the time of the explosion, immediately joined the Ulster Defence Association (UDA). Others included Sammy Duddy, Michael Stone, and Tommy Lyttle. Lyttle, who became brigadier of the UDA West Belfast Brigade, was not there but his wife and two daughters were near the bomb when it went off. They received no injuries, but his daughter Linda said that Lyttle "took it personally". Jackie McDonald, the incumbent South Belfast UDA brigadier, worked as dispatches manager for the Balmoral Furniture Company. The leader of the Ulster Freedom Fighters (UFF, the name the UDA used to claim attacks), John White, who was convicted of the double murder of Senator Paddy Wilson and Irene Andrews in 1973, used the Balmoral bombing as justification for these killings and others.

Within a month of the bombing, the UDA had restructured, adopting a more military structure and establishing a thirteen-member Security Council under Charles Harding Smith to co-ordinate activity.

Michael Stone would go on to perpetrate the Milltown Cemetery attack in 1988, which was caught on camera. Another Protestant man, Eddie Kinner, had been at the scene following the explosion. He lived around the corner from Balmoral. He sought revenge against the IRA and later joined the Ulster Volunteer Force (UVF). He later spoke about his reaction to the Balmoral bombing in an interview with Peter Taylor: "On that occasion, if somebody had handed me a bomb to plant it anywhere you want in the Falls, I would have done it", adding that he had no qualms about taking somebody else's life. Within a week of the attack, the UVF retaliated by planting a bomb at Murtagh's Bar on the Irish nationalist Springfield Road in west Belfast. A 16-year-old Catholic barman, James McCallum, was killed.

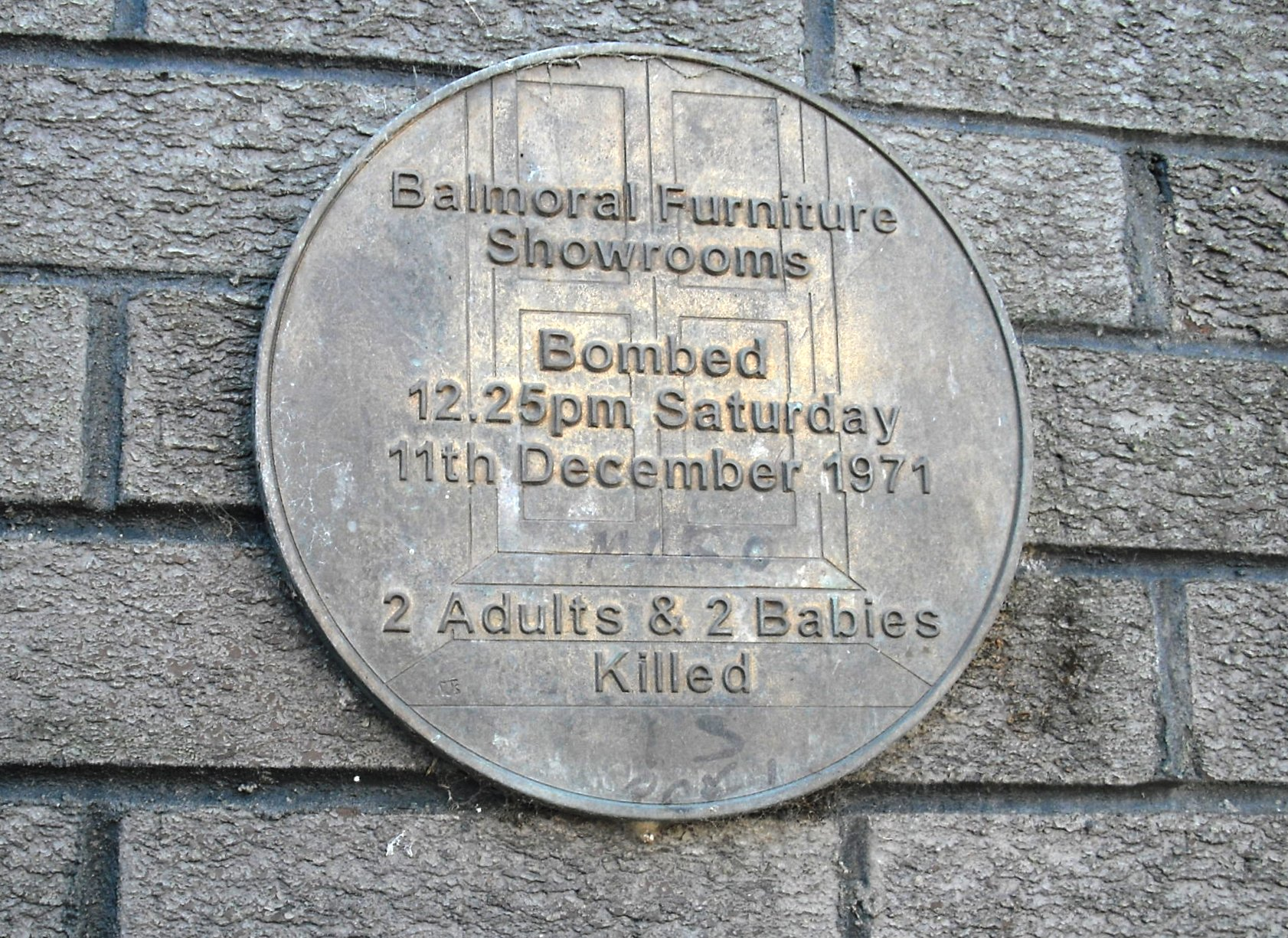
Plaque commemorating the bombing on the side of Shankill Leisure Centre

The building which housed Balmoral's Furniture Company was formerly "Wee Joe's Picture House", dating from the 1930s. Taking its name from "Wee" Joe McKibben, one of three owners of the cinema (which was nicknamed the "Wee Shank"), it was said locally that it cost a jam jar to get in because patrons could go to McKibben's other business, a grocery shop, and swap an empty jam jar for a ticket to the cinema. The edifice was demolished after the bombing. Although a youth on the Shankill had seen the green car and person who planted the device, the bombers were never apprehended nor was anyone ever charged in connection with the attack. The McGurk's Bar bombing was the catalyst that sparked a series of tit-for-tat bombings and shootings by loyalist and republican paramilitaries that would help make the 1970s the bloodiest decade in the 30-year history of the Troubles.

The Balmoral bombing was not the first paramilitary attack in the Shankill Road area. On 29 September 1971, the Four Steps Inn pub had been bombed by the Provisional IRA, resulting in the deaths of two men. It would not be the last either. In August 1975, the Provisional IRA carried out a shooting and bombing attack against the Bayardo Bar on Aberdeen Street, which killed three men and two women – one aged 17. A deadlier attack took place on 23 October 1993 when a two-man IRA unit from Ardoyne carried a bomb carried a bomb into Frizzell's Fish Shop on the Shankill. The device detonated prematurely, killing one of the bombers and ten customers.

=== 1976 bombing ===
Balmoral as a company was also established as a target by this attack and in October 1976 its premises in Dunmurry were blown up in another bomb attack. There were no casualties. Three IRA volunteers were arrested not far from the scene of this attack with one, Bobby Sands, imprisoned for possessing a gun as a result. Sands's fellow hunger striker, Joe McDonnell, was also arrested following this incident. Sands and McDonnell had jointly planned the bomb attack.
