= Sean Kelly (Irish republican) =

Irish republican (born c.1972)

Sean Kelly (born c. 1972) is a former Irish volunteer in the Belfast Brigade of the Provisional Irish Republican Army (IRA), who was a member of the active service unit which carried out the Shankill Road bombing in 1993. Kelly was convicted of nine counts of murder, but was released in 2000 as part of the Good Friday Agreement.

== Shankill Road bomb ==
Kelly was convicted for his part in planting a bomb on the Shankill Road, West Belfast, Northern Ireland, intending to kill Johnny Adair and senior members of the Ulster Defence Association (UDA). The bomb exploded prematurely, killing eight Protestant civilians and a member of the UDA. An 11-second fuse was meant to detonate the bomb after they had shouted a warning. Thomas Begley, a fellow volunteer in the Belfast Brigade, was killed in the botched attack, which left Kelly injured; he lost an eye and has limited use of his left arm.

Kelly was arrested after being picked up by rescuers searching for survivors in the wreckage. Kelly was sentenced to nine terms of life imprisonment at his trial in January 1995.

The judge at his trial, Lord Justice McDermott, described the bombing as "wanton slaughter" and "one of the worst outrages to beset this province in 25 years of violence".

== Release after the Good Friday Agreement ==
Kelly was released in July 2000 under the terms of the Good Friday Agreement. During the Holy Cross dispute, Kelly was reported by Lt. Col. Tim Collins to be present during republican violence in Ardoyne.

Kelly was returned to prison on 18 June 2005 when his early release was suspended amid allegations that he had been involved in rioting. Sinn Féin stated he was trying to calm tensions. Peter Hain, Northern Ireland Secretary, said that he had directed the arrest and return to prison of Kelly on the basis of "security information" available to him. He said he was "satisfied" that Kelly had become re-involved in terrorism. Kelly was re-released on 28 July the same year. The next day the IRA ordered an end to its armed campaign.

== Arrest after shooting incident ==
In February 2013, Kelly was arrested in connection with a shooting incident which resulted in an 18-year-old male requiring emergency hospital treatment, after being shot in both legs, in what was described as a paramilitary-style attack. The PSNI later said that following inquiries, it was no longer being treated as such, but rather as a shooting. First minister Peter Robinson said the arrest could have "grave consequences" for the political process and called for a meeting with PSNI Chief Constable Matt Baggott, to find out how police are able to say that the shooting is not linked to paramilitaries and also to establish the background of the case.

== Work with Sinn Féin ==
Kelly canvassed for Sinn Féin's John Finucane in the 2017 and 2019 Westminster elections. This was criticised by the families of some of the victims of the Shankill Road bombing. John O'Dowd of Sinn Féin defended the party's decision to use Kelly as a canvasser, saying, "Sean Kelly is out canvassing to promote politics and the peace process".
