= Billy McQuiston =

Northern Irish Ulster loyalist

- Born: William McQuiston; Shankill Road, Belfast, Northern Ireland
- Other name: Twister
- Occupation: community worker
- Known for: leader of the A Company, Highfield, West Belfast Brigade, Ulster Defence Association (UDA)

William McQuiston, also known as "Twister", is an Ulster loyalist, who was a high-ranking member of the Ulster Defence Association (UDA). Leader of the organisation's A Company, Highfield, West Belfast Brigade, McQuiston spent more than 12 years in HM Prison Maze outside Lisburn for possession of weapons. He is now a community activist, often working with former members of the Provisional Irish Republican Army (IRA) in West Belfast's troubled interface areas where adjoining loyalist and republican communities occasionally clash.

== Ulster Defence Association ==
McQuiston was born and raised in west Belfast's staunchly loyalist and Protestant Shankill Road area. Billy McQuiston joined the junior wing of the UDA immediately after the 1971 Balmoral Furniture Company bombing, with his decision also influenced by his father having been UDA commander in the area at the time. He recalls: "The area I came from, the family that I came from and the activity that was going on in that area, I don’t think I really had any other choice." He was almost 15 at the time the bomb exploded on a Saturday afternoon in the heart of the Shankill, which was crowded with shoppers. The bomb killed two adult men and two babies. McQuiston was with a friend and they were on their way to the city centre; the boys rushed to the scene and saw the bodies of the infants as they were brought out of the rubble, wrapped in sheets. The following evening he and several friends attended a meeting of the local UDA. One at a time, the teenaged boys were brought into a room by two men wearing hoods. McQuiston faced three men seated at a table on which rested a Bible, gun and an Ulster Banner. After being asked his motive for wishing to join the UDA, he repeated an oath with one hand upon the Bible and the other the gun, and was duly sworn in as a member of the "Ulster Young Militants" (UYM), the junior wing of the UDA.

He became the leader of the UDA's A Company, Highfield, West Belfast Brigade. Described by journalist David Lister as "stocky, and impish-faced", the five feet four McQuiston had a reputation among the UDA as a "messer", which is Belfast slang for a practical joker.

He was first sent to prison on the evidence of a supergrass. He spent 31 days on hunger strike in 1982. He was released in the mid-1980s and it was during this period that he became acquainted with the British agent Brian Nelson, who had infiltrated the UDA. McQuiston was soon sent back to the Maze Prison after being caught in Portadown with masks, hoods, and weapons. Upon his release in 1991, he survived an assassination attempt by the IRA who had broken down his door with a sledgehammer and tried to shoot him with an AK-47. He evaded his attackers by escaping through his loft. In an interview with journalist Peter Taylor in the 1990s, he stated that he had not been overly perturbed by the attempt on his life. He offered the following explanation for his nonchalance

It's a war. I'm a soldier in the UDA so I'm entitled to be shot at now and again. I think I was extremely lucky.

On 23 October 1993, he was on the Shankill Road conducting business for the Loyalist Prisoners' Association (LPA). He had just gone into a pub when an IRA bomb went off in a fish shop below the LPA headquarters where it was believed senior UDA members, including Ulster Freedom Fighters (UFF) brigadier Johnny Adair, were having a meeting. The IRA's intelligence was faulty and the meeting had been cancelled; instead of wiping out Adair and his comrades, 10 people were killed in the shop below, including two children, the shop's owner, and his daughter, low-rank UDA member Michael Morrison, and Thomas Begley, one of the bombers. McQuiston helped pull the dead and wounded from the devastated building.

== Role in Adair feud ==
McQuiston remained a popular and influential figure in Highfield, a loyalist estate located on the Upper Shankill and near the republican Ballymurphy area. In 2003, the UDA's South Belfast brigadier Jackie McDonald contacted McQuiston shortly after the murder of South-East Antrim brigadier John "Grugg" Gregg to secure Twister's aid in avoiding too much bloodshed in an operation to remove Johnny Adair, who was held responsible for Gregg's killing. McQuiston helped to ensure that A and B companies of the West Belfast brigade, covering the Highfield and Woodvale areas, agreed not to oppose McDonald's operations in the lower Shankill whilst McQuiston was also put in charge of a scheme at the Shankill's Heather Street Social Club where members of the lower Shankill C Company could attend to break from Adair and return to the mainstream UDA. Mo Courtney was amongst the leading figures to take this opportunity.

== Subsequent activities ==
Since leaving the UDA, McQuiston has worked as a community activist for the Springfield Intercommunity Development Project. He works alongside former IRA members in troubled interface areas near the west Belfast Peace Line where loyalists and republicans sometimes clash, especially during the annual 12 July Orange Order parades which commemorate the Battle of the Boyne. This was particularly noted in the summer of 2003 when a relatively calm marching season followed at the interfaces of north and west Belfast as a result of co-operation between McQuiston and his Provisional IRA counterpart Sean "Spike" Murray. He is also a member of the UDA's political advisory group, the Ulster Political Research Group (UPRG).
