= Pearse Jordan =

Member of the IRA

- Born: Pearse Patrick Jordan; 12 December 1969; Lower Falls, Belfast, Northern Ireland
- Died: 25 November 1992 (aged 22); Falls Road, Belfast, Northern Ireland
- Cause of death: Shot by the Royal Ulster Constabulary's HMSU
- Burial place: Milltown Cemetery
- Military career
- Paramilitary: Provisional IRA
- Rank: Volunteer
- Unit: Belfast Brigade
- Conflicts: The Troubles

Pearse Jordan (12 December 1969 – 25 November 1992) was a Provisional Irish Republican Army (IRA) volunteer killed by a Royal Ulster Constabulary officer. In 2001 the European Court of Human Rights ordered the British Government to pay fines to the families of several IRA men, including Jordan's, after holding that the men's human rights were violated by flawed inquest procedures. Following this judgement, British law regarding inquests was changed.

== Background ==
Jordan was born in the lower Falls Road area of Belfast, Northern Ireland. When he was six months old, during the time of the Falls Curfew, he almost died from the effects of CS gas during an army operation. A neighbour rushed the unconscious Jordan to hospital. Jordan suffered from the side effects of this for the remainder of his life. Soon after this incident the family moved to Roden Street and later to the New Barnsley area.

Jordan was educated at St Aidan's Primary School and St Thomas' Secondary School. After leaving school he joined his family in the catering trade.

== Circumstances of death ==
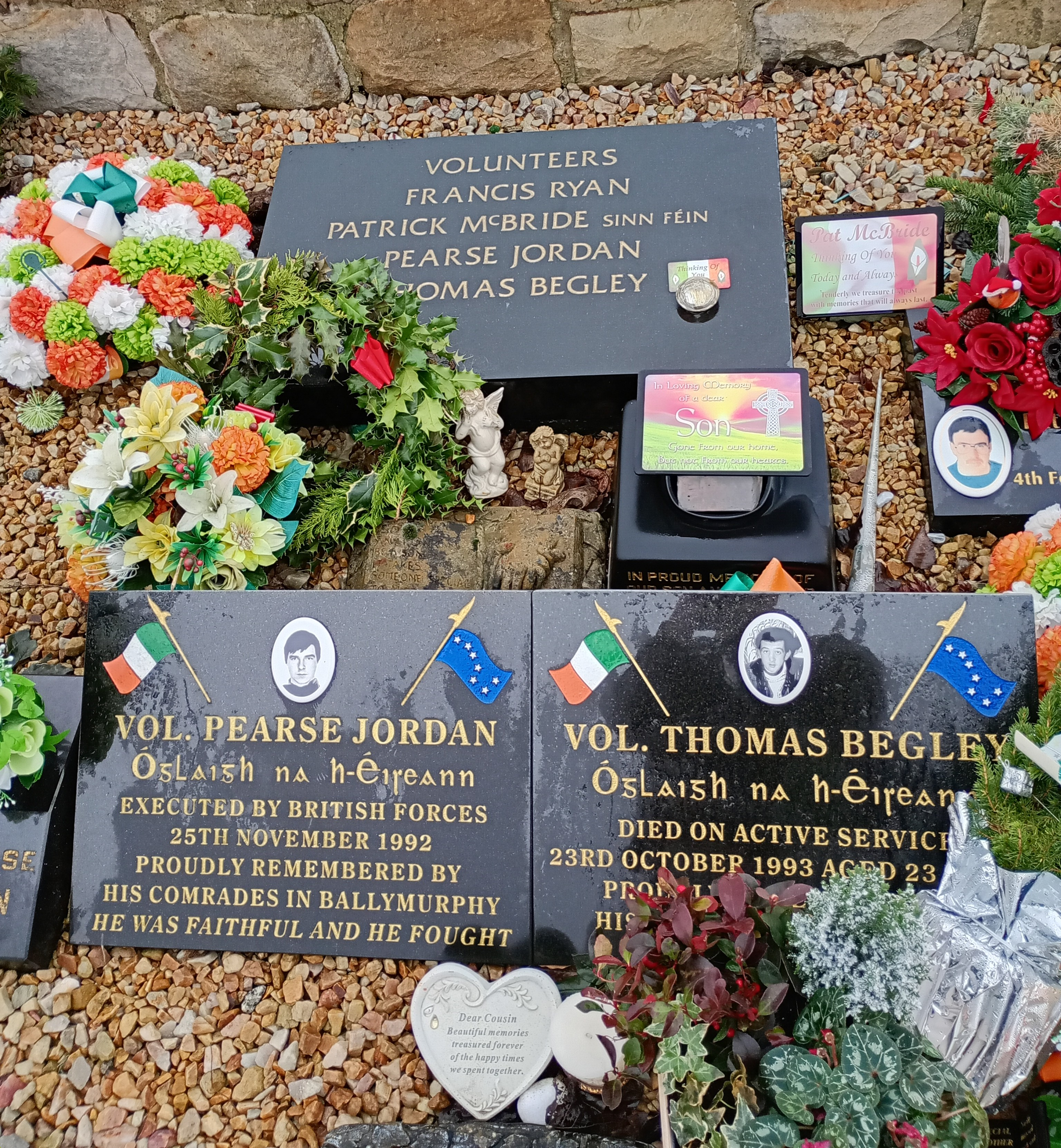
Grave of Jordan and Thomas Begley in Milltown Cemetery, Belfast

The circumstances surrounding Jordan's death are disputed. It is undisputed that in the afternoon of 25 November 1992, at between 3 and 6pm, Jordan was driving a car in Belfast. While on the Falls Road his car was forcefully rammed by an unmarked police car. The car was disguised, but all of the occupants were in full Police uniforms. Jordan then abandoned his car, and was subsequently shot three times from behind by Sergeant A, an unnamed member of a Royal Ulster Constabulary (RUC) Headquarters Mobile Support Unit.

Jordan was fatally wounded from the shots and he died a short distance from where his car had been abandoned. The post-mortem report noted a bruise on Jordan's face and shin. No guns, ammunition, explosives, masks or gloves were found in the car, and Jordan had been unarmed. The shooting was witnessed by four civilians and several police officers.

Sergeant A stated that the officers believed Jordan was transporting weapons for the Provisional Irish Republican Army. Sergeant A also stated that his team signalled to Jordan several times for him to pull over, but that Jordan accelerated instead, reaching 60–70 mph. They pursued him and nudged his car to a halt. Their siren was on throughout the chase. Jordan had left his car and was running away. In the meantime a second crew arrived on the scene. Sergeant A gave Jordan a warning shout, ordering him to stop. The other police officers were shouting as well. Jordan turned towards the sergeant in an aggressive manner. His arms were down and his hands out of sight; the sergeant's vision was obscured either by his own car or the other crew's. He feared Jordan was armed and posing a threat to the sergeant's life. He was certain there were no viable alternatives, and fired at Jordan, who fell over. According to the members of the other crew, as they arrived on the scene and were stopping their car, Jordan either ran into them or their car struck him, bumping him.

The four civilian witnesses stated that after Jordan's car had been rammed and brought to a stop, he then emerged from the car, shaken, and staggered across the road towards them, followed by police officers. An officer about twelve feet away fired a number of shots, striking Jordan. No warning was issued by any of the officers. There had been nothing threatening in Jordan's actions. When the officers caught up with him, they verbally abused him, and pushed his face into the ground, where he was kicked and searched. The civilians had an unobstructed view of the scene from across the road. Jordan's family, as well as an Amnesty International report, suggest that the incident might have been a pre-planned operation to kill rather than arrest Jordan.

== Inquest ==
Memorial tablet to Pearse Jordan

An inquest was started regarding Jordan's death. One year after the incident the Director of Public Prosecutions ddirected that nobody would be prosecuted in relation to Jordan's death.

Pearse Jordan's inquest is currently adjourned pending full disclosure of relevant material from the state.

== European Court of Human Rights ==
In May 2001, Jordan's case was heard by the European Court of Human Rights along with three similar cases. The Court agreed that Jordan's death was in violation of Article 2 of the European Convention on Human Rights, a section of which reads: "Everyone's right to life shall be protected by law. No one shall be deprived of his life intentionally save in the execution of a sentence of a court following his conviction of a crime for which this penalty is provided by law."

At the High Court, counsel for the Jordan family argued that the Secretary of State was in continued breach of Article 2 of the European Convention on Human Rights by failing to properly investigate Jordan's killing. The counsel also stated that the British government is still in breach of European law, and he called upon the Court of Appeal to issue a declaration that such a breach exists, along with an 'order of mandamus' to instruct immediate corrective action from the Secretary of State.

Counsel for the Secretary of State argued that the inquest system is the way in which Article 2 is complied with by the state.

== Song ==
The circumstances of Jordan's death are recounted in the Irish rebel/Republican song "Pearse Jordan" written & recorded by The Irish Brigade. The recurring phrase "Slán go fóill mo chara" – the song is otherwise in English – in Irish means "Goodbye, my friend/comrade".
