= Yavi massacre =

Mass shooting in Yavi, Çat, Erzurum, Turkey

- Part of the Kurdish-Turkish conflict (1978-present)
- Location: Yavi, Çat, Erzurum
- Date: 25 October 1993
- Target: Civilians
- Attack type: Mass shooting
- Deaths: 38
- Injuries: 50
- Perpetrator: Kurdistan Workers' Party

Yavi massacre was a mass shooting organized by the PKK on October 25, 1993 in the Yavi neighbourhood of Çat district of Erzurum, Turkey.

== Massacre ==
On October 25, 1993, at around 19.30, PKK members, aged between 20 and 25, drove to Yavi in a hijacked pickup truck and opened fire on people gathered in a coffee house to watch the television news. 38 people were killed and around 50 were injured in the attack. Necmi Köse and Köksal Aktaş, who survived the massacre stated that the gendarmerie came to the village and they were told that an identity check would be carried out and left, and then PKK members disguised as gendarmes started shooting at them. According to other survivors Abdullah Duman and Recep Dursunoğlu, 4 people dressed in military uniforms came to the coffee shop and they were served tea. These 4 people then asked for other young people in the village to be invited into the coffee shop. After their arrival, they rose from their seats, and shouted, "We are the PKK, this is Kurdistan territory" and opened fire. The gunfire continued for 10–15 minutes until the killers left.

5 of the victims were children.

== Reactions ==
After the funerals of the victims of the massacre took place, people gathered in the Erzurum city square protested by chanting "We do not trust the army, give us weapons, we will protect ourselves", "Government resign" and "Death to the PKK". On October 27, students of Erzurum's Atatürk University organized a protest march against the attack in the morning. The number of protesters, including citizens who closed their workplaces and left their jobs to join the march, exceeded 10,000.

On October 29, a delegation of the Social Democratic Populist Party (SDPP) went to Yavi to conduct an investigation into the massacre. When the delegation, consisting of SDPP parliamentary deputy chairman Kamer Genç, SDPP general secretary Halil Çulhaoğlu and Uşak deputy Ural Köklü, approached the coffeehouse, they encountered the attack and verbal protest of the villagers. The vehicles of the SDPP delegation, which left Yavi in a short time, were stoned by the villagers. A special team officer saved Kamer Genç from being beaten at the last moment.

== Aftermath ==
Yavi Municipality built a Martyr's Memorial in the village on October 25, 2010.

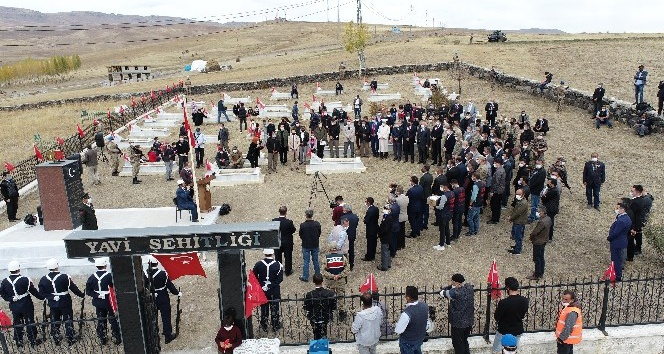
Martyr's memorial built on October 25, 2010, in dedication to the victims of the massacre in Yavi, Çat, Erzurum, Turkey
