= Thomas Begley =

Irish Republican

- Born: 10 November 1970; Ardoyne, Belfast, Northern Ireland
- Died: 23 October 1993 (aged 22); Shankill Road, Belfast
- Cause of death: Bomb explosion
- Known for: Provisional Irish Republican Army Volunteer

Thomas Begley (10 November 1970 – 23 October 1993) was a volunteer in the Belfast Brigade of the Provisional Irish Republican Army (IRA). Begley was killed when a bomb he was planting on the Shankill Road, West Belfast, Northern Ireland exploded prematurely, killing him, a UDA member and eight Protestant civilians.

== Background ==
Begley was born in the nationalist Ardoyne area of north Belfast. Begley not only believed in Irish republicanism but also in republicanism and non-sectarianism. In January 1993 Begley joined the IRA and was noted by his commanders for his eagerness and determination in comprehending the techniques and methods used by more senior members of his brigade.

== Paramilitary activity ==
Begley was linked to the killing of off-duty Royal Irish Regiment soldier Stephen Waller on 30 December 1992, at Waller's home in the Cavehill district of Belfast after having spent time serving in Cyprus. Begley was identified by Waller's wife.

The IRA's Belfast Brigade launched an operation to assassinate the UDA's top commanders, whom it believed were at a meeting on the Shankill Road. The plan was for two IRA members to enter the shop with a time bomb, force out the customers at gunpoint and flee before it exploded; killing those at the meeting. As they believed the meeting was being held in the room above the shop, the bomb was designed to send the blast upwards. IRA members maintained that they would have warned the customers as the bomb was primed. It had an eleven-second fuse, and the IRA said that this would have allowed just enough time to clear the downstairs shop but not enough for those upstairs to escape.

Begley and two other IRA members from the Ardoyne area hijacked a blue Ford Escort and drove it to the fish shop. When they arrived, Begley and Sean Kelly, wearing the white coats and caps of delivery men, entered the shop carrying the bomb. Begley was killed when the bomb exploded prematurely, also killing an off-duty UDA member, Michael Morrison, and eight civilians, including two children. Forensic evidence pointed to Begley holding the five-pound bomb, which had an 11-second fuse, above the refrigerated serving counter at the fish shop when it exploded. Kelly was convicted of murder for his part in the Shankill Road bombing.

== Funeral ==
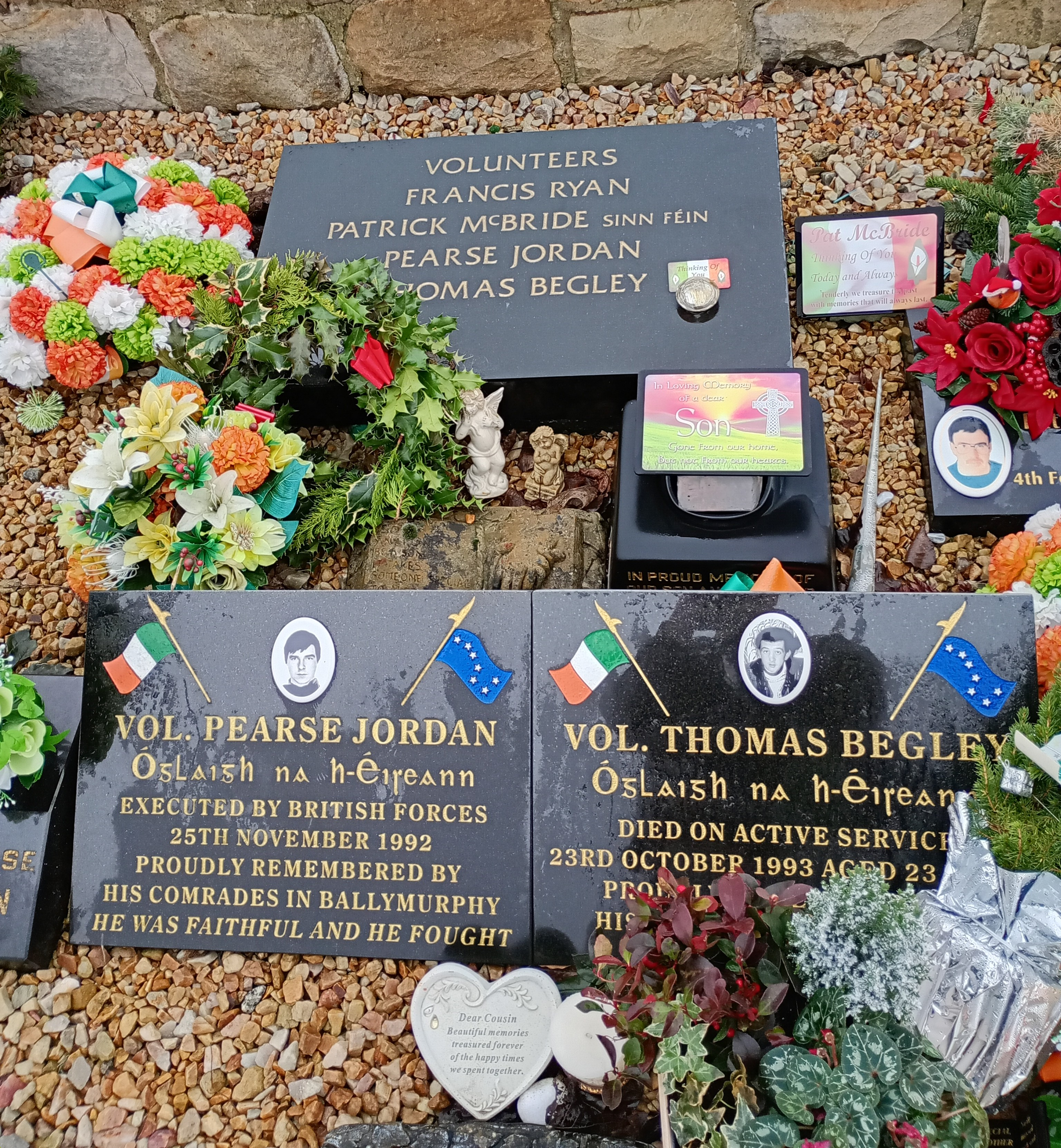
Grave of Begley and Pearse Jordan in Milltown Cemetery, Belfast

IRA member Eddie Copeland was shot and injured when a British Army soldier fired 20 live rounds in a crowd of mourners who were attending Begley's wake in north Belfast. Private Andrew Clarke, 27 from Merseyside, who fired the shots, was later jailed for ten years for attempted murder. At Begley's funeral, Sinn Féin leader Gerry Adams carried Begley's coffin, which caused angry backlash from some quarters, including the victims' families.

== Aftermath ==
Violence erupted in Northern Ireland in the weeks after Begley's death. The UDA stated that they would obtain revenge for the attack and claimed "John Hume, Gerry Adams and the nationalist electorate will pay a heavy, heavy price for today's atrocity." Within 12 hours of the Shankill bombing, a 22-year-old male Catholic civilian was shot and killed, and within a week five others were also killed.

In 2001, residents of the loyalist Glenbryn estate displayed a banner, on the eighth anniversary of Begley's bombing, with the words "Walk of Shame", and photographs of those killed by the bomb attached, as riot police escorted schoolgirls and their parents along Ardoyne Road during the Holy Cross dispute.

A mural dedicated to dead IRA members, including Begley, was painted in Ardoyne Avenue, near the Begley family home. In October 2013, a plaque commemorating Begley was unveiled in the republican Ardoyne section of North Belfast.
