= Palar blast =

Landmine attack on 9 April 1993 in Karnataka, India

Palar Blast
- Date: 9 April 1993
- Location: 11.958°N 77.644°E
- Cause: IED Landmine
- Deaths: 22
- Injuries: 13
- Accused: Veerappan; Muthulakshmi; Kolathur Mani; S. Sivasubramaniam; Savaraiyappan; Papathi; Bonda Basava; Eranna, etc.

The Palar Blast was a landmine attack on 9 April 1993 in Karnataka, India. The attack, organized by the forest brigand Veerappan, killed 22 people, making it the deadliest explosive attack in Karnataka during the 20th century.

== Background ==
The sandalwood smuggler and criminal Veerappan killed a Bandari in Govindapadi village of Mettur on 8, April 1993, suspecting him to be a police informer and openly challenged the police force to track and arrest his gang. He also claimed he would raise a banner at Kolathur village on shandy day, written in Tamil language challenging "Rambo" Gopalakrishnan, the Tamil Nadu police officer, who also belonged to Veerappan's caste. Months prior to this Karnataka and Tamil Nadu had formed a joint Special Task Force, with one of their objectives being to track down Veerappan.

Taking the open challenge, IPS officer K. Gopalakrishnan left Palar base of the area's Special Task Force, near M. M. Hills, 100 km from Kollegal of Karnataka along with a team of 41 members which included police from two states, forest officials, forest watchers and informers. The team left in two vehicles, of which one was a bus carrying most of the team members, and a jeep carrying K. Goplakrishnan, the IPS officer, who stood on the footboard of the jeep watching the road ahead. The Veerappan gang had planted IED landmines on the road in more than 14 places to halt their approach.

== Incident ==
As the bus was passing over the landmines, Simon Madaiah detonated the gelatin sticks just outside the town of Surakkamaduvu, resulting in an explosion that threw the bus hundreds of feet away and killed 22 people. Madaiah sustained minor injuries during the incident but escaped in the forest. Among the deceased were five policemen of Tamil Nadu, 17 forest officials and informers, while 13 other members of the team, including Karnataka police, were injured. Members of the Veerappan gang then fired on the team from a vantage point in the forest. The police returned fire in self-protection and to prevent the outlaws from stealing the team's arms and ammunition.

Tamil Nadu IPS officer K. Gopalakrishnan, who was standing on the footboard of the jeep, was thrown out during the explosion. He suffered severe injuries to his head and legs and required nine surgeries. He returned to duty after 18 months and later retired as DIG in 2008. He witnessed several members of the gang including Madhaiayan, Gnanaprakasam, Simon and Bilavendran at the blast site. His eye witness testimony was crucial in prosecuting those members responsible for the blast.

== Aftermath ==
Police filed a case at M. M. Hills Police Station against 124 persons under TADA in connection with the blast and 50 were arrested by police. The accused included Veerappan, Muthulakshmi, Kolathur Mani, and reporter S. Sivasubramaniam. Muthulakshmi, wife of Veerappan as well as Kolathur Mani, a Tamil activist were acquitted. Seven members of Veerappan's gang were convicted and awarded with life term sentences. A later appeal at the Supreme Court by four of the members, would see these life sentences changed to the death penalty, a rare occurrence. The four convicts; Jnanaprakash (Veerappan's elder brother), Bilavendran, Simon and Meesekar Madaiah, filed against execution of their death penalties at Karnataka High Court.
