= Shankill Road bombing =

1993 IRA attack in Belfast, Northern Ireland

- Part of the Troubles
- Aftermath of the bombing
- Location: 54°36′14″N 5°57′07″W; 271 Shankill Road, Belfast, Northern Ireland
- Date: 23 October 1993; 13:00 (GMT)
- Target: UDA leadership
- Attack type: Time bomb
- Deaths: 10 (including bomber)
- Injuries: 57
- Perpetrator: Provisional IRA Belfast Brigade
- No. of participants: 2

The Shankill Road bombing was carried out by the Provisional Irish Republican Army (IRA) on 23 October 1993 and is one of the most well-known incidents of the Troubles in Northern Ireland. The IRA aimed to assassinate the leadership of the loyalist Ulster Defence Association (UDA), supposedly attending a meeting above Frizzell's fish shop on the Shankill Road, Belfast. Two IRA members disguised as deliverymen entered the shop carrying a bomb, which detonated prematurely. Ten people were killed: one of the IRA bombers, a UDA member and eight Protestant civilians, two of whom were children. More than fifty people were wounded. The targeted office was empty at the time of the bombing, but the IRA had allegedly realised that the tightly packed area below would inevitably cause "collateral damage" of civilian casualties and continued regardless. However, the IRA have denied this saying that they intended to evacuate the civilians before the explosion. It is alleged, and unearthed MI5 documents appear to prove, that British intelligence failed to act on a tip off about the bombing.

The loyalist Shankill Road had been the location of other bomb and gun attacks, including the Balmoral Furniture Company bombing in 1971 and the Mountainview Tavern attack and Bayardo Bar attack both in 1975, but the 1993 bombing had the most casualties. It resulted in a wave of revenge attacks by loyalists, who killed 14 civilians in the week that followed, almost all of them Catholics. The deadliest attack was the Greysteel massacre.

== Background ==
During the early 1990s, loyalist paramilitaries drastically increased their attacks on the Irish Catholic and Irish nationalist community and – for the first time since the beginning of the Troubles – were responsible for more deaths than republicans. The UDA's West Belfast brigade, and its commander Johnny Adair, played a key role in this. Adair had become the group's commander in 1990. In 1993 it became public that Social Democratic and Labour Party (SDLP) leader John Hume and Sinn Féin leader Gerry Adams were engaged in talks as part of the unfolding Northern Ireland peace process aimed at securing an IRA ceasefire. Loyalists saw this process as a serious threat to their position within the United Kingdom from what they labelled the "pan-nationalist front" (allegedly encompassing the SDLP, Sinn Fein, the Irish government, and even the Gaelic Athletic Association). Throughout the autumn of 1993, loyalist paramilitaries intensified their campaign of bombings and shootings against the Catholic community in Northern Ireland, particularly in North and West Belfast. In one incident, a mentally impaired Catholic man was beaten to death by an Ulster Volunteer Force (UVF) gang. However, nationalist politicians, such as SDLP deputy leader Seamus Mallon, pointed out that loyalist paramilitaries had been carrying out indiscriminate sectarian murders long before the emergence of the Hume–Adams talks.

The relentless attacks upon the Catholic community in Belfast led to grassroots pressure upon the IRA to retaliate. The IRA was reluctant to do so because they believed it would divert energy from their campaign against British security forces and "economic targets". Allegedly, after a pub in West Belfast was sprayed with gunfire by the UDA, an IRA unit planned to detonate a large car bomb in a Protestant housing estate in Lisburn, but IRA commanders quickly threatened to expel anyone involved in such an unauthorised attack. Interviewed a week before the Shankill Road bombing, a representative of the IRA's "General Headquarters Staff" stated:

We in the IRA are very clear about a number of issues. One is that no one should respond to the activities of the loyalist death squads in anything but a disciplined manner. We in the IRA will under no circumstances play into British hands by going down the cul-de-sac of sectarian warfare, which would allow our enemy to portray itself as somehow holding the ring between warring factions in Ireland. But as we have demonstrated ... there is no hiding place for those involved with the loyalist death squads. We are determined to exact a price from them. No one should be under any illusions. Those involved with the loyalist death squads will be held accountable for their actions.

The UDA's Shankill headquarters was above Frizzell's fish shop on Shankill Road. The UDA's Inner Council and West Belfast brigade regularly met there on Saturdays. Peter Taylor says it was also the office of the Loyalist Prisoners' Association (LPA) and, on Saturday mornings, was normally crowded, as that was when money was given to prisoners' families. In 1992 a police informer had heard that the IRA were planning to attack the building using coffee-jar bombs packed with Semtex but the plan never materialised. According to Henry McDonald and Jim Cusack, the IRA had the building under surveillance for some time. The IRA had already tried to assassinate Johnny Adair on three separate occasions in 1993 and, three days before the Shankill Road bomb, the Royal Ulster Constabulary (RUC) arrested an Irish National Liberation Army (INLA) hit squad near his home.

An interview Adair gave to The Guardian newspaper bestowed the IRA's plans even greater urgency; striking at the UDA's headquarters, killing Adair and other senior UDA men mere days after he had boasted about killing Catholics in a national newspaper would be the "ideal rebuttal" to the growing criticism the IRA faced in Catholic Belfast and in the organisation's own ranks. On 22 October, in Newtownabbey on the outskirts of Belfast, the UDA shot and seriously injured a Catholic taxi driver and carried out pipe bomb attacks on two homes in which it believed Catholics resided. The UDA also claimed responsibility for a car bomb that failed to detonate in the predominantly Catholic Elmfield estate. Reportedly, the IRA made the final decision to launch the operation when one of their scouts spotted Adair entering the building on the morning of Saturday 23 October 1993. Later, in a secretly recorded conversation with police, Adair confirmed that he had been in the building that morning.

== The bombing ==
The IRA's Belfast Brigade launched an operation to assassinate the UDA's top commanders, whom they believed were at the meeting. The plan allegedly was for two IRA members to enter the shop with a time bomb, force out the customers at gunpoint, and flee before it exploded, killing those at the meeting. As they believed the meeting was being held in the room above the shop, the bomb was designed to send the blast upwards. IRA members maintained that they would have warned the customers as the bomb was primed. It had an eleven-second fuse, and the IRA stated that this would have allowed just enough time to clear the downstairs shop but not enough for those upstairs to escape. The initial plan was to rake the building with a 12.7mm DShK heavy machine gun mounted to a lorry, but the odds of the IRA members involved being killed or captured by British security forces afterwards made it too risky.

The operation would be carried out by Thomas Begley and Seán Kelly, two IRA members in their early twenties from Ardoyne. They drove from Ardoyne in a hijacked blue Ford Escort, which they parked on Berlin Street, around the corner from Frizzell's. Dressed as deliverymen, they entered the shop with the five-pound bomb in a holdall. It was shortly after 1 p.m. on a Saturday afternoon and the area was crowded with mostly women and children. Whilst Kelly waited at the door, Begley made his way through the customers towards the counter, where the bomb detonated prematurely. Forensic evidence showed that Begley had been holding the bomb over the refrigerated serving counter when it exploded. Begley was killed along with nine other people, two of them children. They were the owner John Frizzell (63) and his daughter Sharon McBride (29); Leanne Murray (13); UDA member Michael Morrison (27), his partner Evelyn Baird (27), and their daughter Michelle (7); George Williamson (63) and his wife Gillian (49); and Wilma McKee (38). The force of the blast caused the old building to collapse into a pile of rubble. The upper floor came down upon those inside the shop, crushing many of the survivors under the rubble, where they remained until rescued some hours later by volunteers and emergency services. About 57 people were injured. At the scene during the rescue operation were several senior loyalists, including Adair and Billy McQuiston. The latter had been in a pub on the nearest corner when the bomb went off. Among those rescued from the rubble was the badly-wounded Kelly.

Unknown to the IRA, if a UDA meeting had taken place, it had ended early and those attending it had left the building before the bomb exploded. McDonald and Cusack state that Adair and his men had stopped using the room for important meetings, allegedly because a sympathiser within the RUC told Adair that the police had it bugged.

Although the bomb had detonated prematurely, casualties could have been much higher but the bomb exploded upward as intended, taking out the floors above the fish shop rather than damaging adjoining buildings. One senior British security source commented afterwards:

The difference between that [the Shankill bombing] being a disaster and a stunning success in IRA terms was very marginal. The bomb was designed to direct the blast upwards, and it did—in the fruit shop next door the rows of oranges were hardly disturbed.

== Aftermath ==
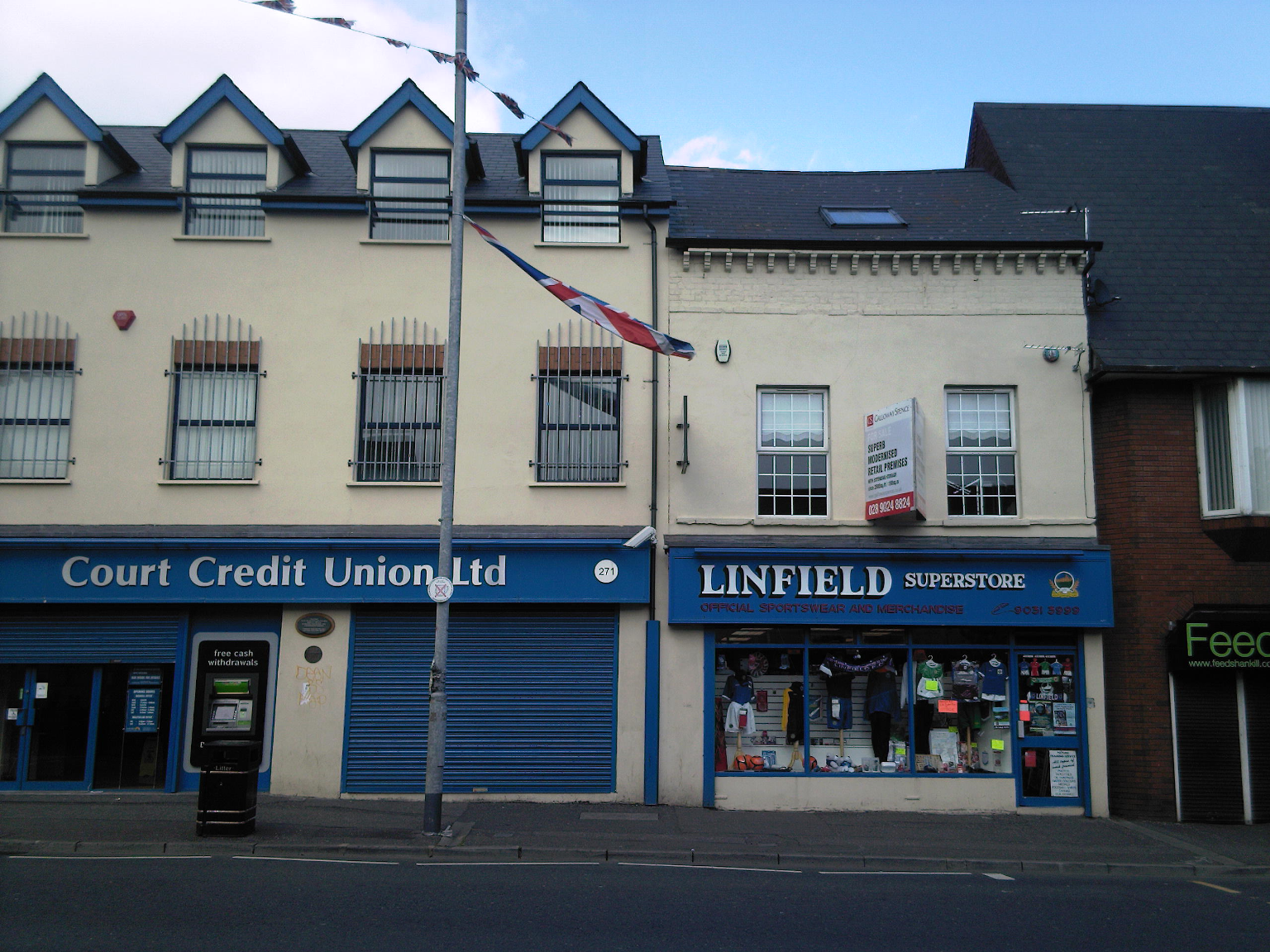
Scene of the bombing, as of 2011

There was great anger and outrage in the Shankill in the wake of the bombing. McQuiston told journalist Peter Taylor that "anybody on the Shankill Road that day, from a Boy Scout to a granny, if you'd given them a gun they would have gone out and retaliated". Many Protestants saw the bombing as an indiscriminate attack on them. Adair believed that the bomb was meant for him. Two days after the bombing, as Adair was driving away from his house, he stopped and told a police officer, "I'm away to plan a mass murder".

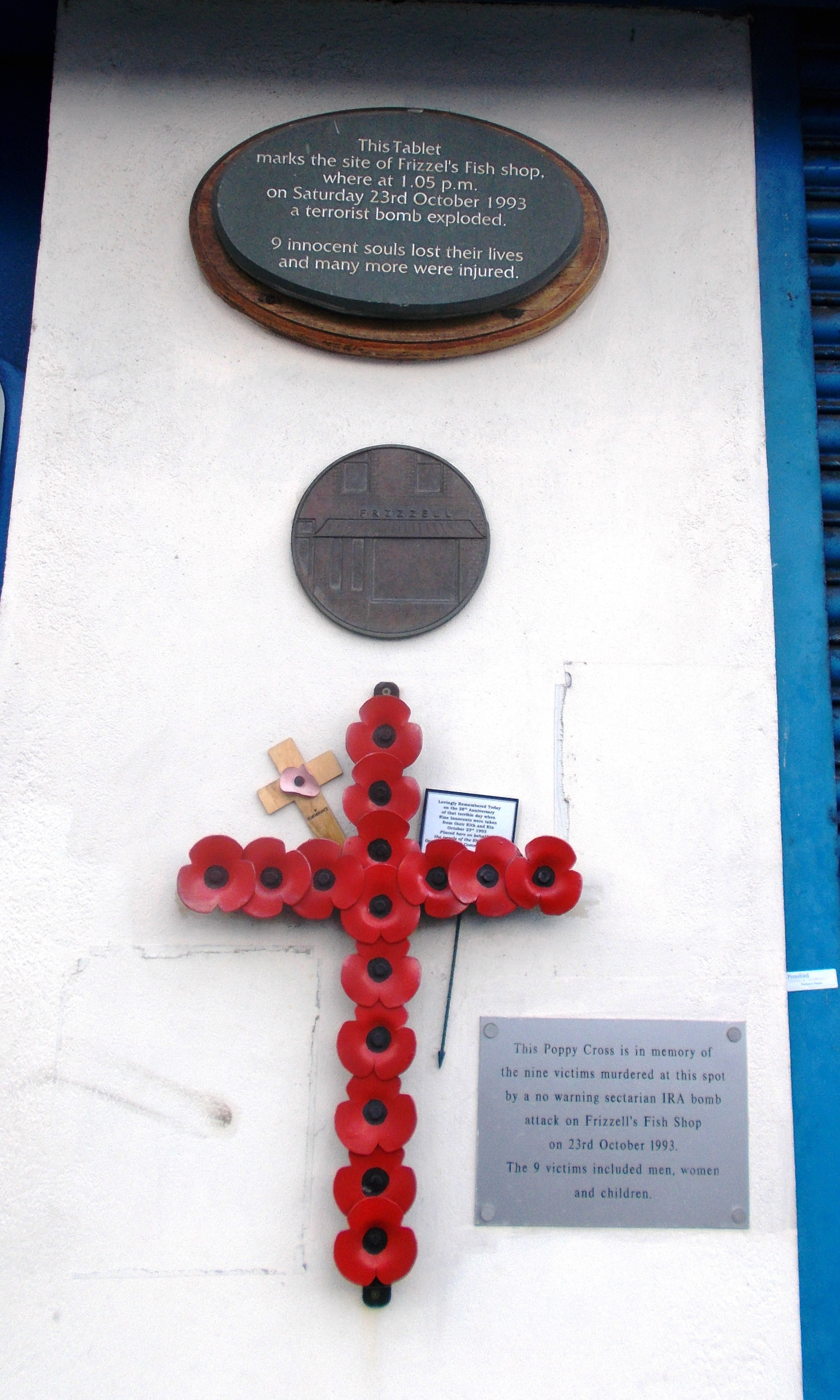
Memorials at 271 Shankill Road, the site of the bombing

In the week following the bombing, the UDA and UVF launched a wave of "revenge attacks", killing 14 civilians. The UDA shot a Catholic delivery driver in Belfast after luring him to a bogus call just a few hours after the bombing. He died on 25 October. On 26 October, the UDA shot dead another two Catholic civilians and wounded five in an indiscriminate attack at a Council Depot on Kennedy Way, Belfast. On 30 October, UDA members entered a pub in Greysteel frequented by Catholics and again opened fire indiscriminately. Eight civilians (six Catholics and two Protestants) were killed and 13 were wounded. This became known as the Greysteel massacre. The UDA stated it was a direct retaliation for the Shankill Road bombing. Michael Stone and another UDA member said that Adair also vowed to launch simultaneous attacks on Catholics attending mass in Belfast. The day after the attack (Sunday), the security forces were sent to guard all Catholic churches in Belfast. A UDA member said that a carload of gunmen were sent to attack Holy Family Catholic Church on the Limestone Road, but called off the attack due to the high security. Adair denied the claims.

At Begley's wake, a British soldier fired upon a group of mourners standing outside Begley's home. The soldier fired twenty shots from a passing Land Rover. Among those wounded was republican activist Eddie Copeland, who needed extensive surgery. The court heard that the soldiers had been shown a photograph of Copeland before being sent on patrol. The soldier who fired the shots, Trooper Andrew Clarke, was jailed for ten years for attempted murder. Begley was given a republican funeral in west Belfast. Gerry Adams, president of Sinn Féin, used "unusually strong language" in condemning the bombing, saying it was wrong and could not be excused. However, he was criticised for being a pall-bearer at Begley's funeral. David McKittrick and Eamonn Mallie wrote that, if Adams had shunned the funeral, it would have been "the end of him as a republican leader", severely damaged his credibility within the republican movement, and made it difficult for him to secure an IRA ceasefire. Others, such as Taoiseach Albert Reynolds and RUC Chief Constable Hugh Annesley, agreed with this view.

Kelly, the surviving IRA member, was badly wounded in the blast, having lost his left eye and being unable to move his left arm. Upon his release from hospital, he was arrested and convicted of nine counts of murder, each with a corresponding life sentence. In July 2000, he was released under the terms of the Belfast Agreement. In an interview shortly after his release, he said he had never intended to kill innocent people and regrets what happened.

== Informer allegations ==
In 2016, allegations were made that the IRA commander who planned the bombing was a police informer for the RUC's Special Branch, and that he told his handlers of the planned attack. This information allegedly came from classified documents stolen by the IRA from Castlereagh RUC base in 2002. IRA members believe the informer was given the go-ahead by his handlers to rig the bomb so that it exploded prematurely. They believe the goal was to cause mass civilian casualties, weakening those in the IRA who opposed a ceasefire and who wanted to continue the armed campaign. Relatives of the victims asked the Police Ombudsman to investigate whether police knew about the attack before it happened.

== See also ==
- Chronology of Provisional Irish Republican Army actions (1990–99)
- Bayardo Bar attack
- 1994 Shankill Road killings
