= Greysteel massacre =

1993 mass shooting in Northern Ireland

- Part of The Troubles
- Front of the Rising Sun Bar (Note: The Rising Sun's facade has since been remodelled. At the time, it looked identical to as shown in this photograph.)

- Location: 55°01′55″N 7°07′20″W; Rising Sun Bar, Greysteel, County Londonderry, Northern Ireland
- Date: 30 October 1993; 33 years ago 22:00
- Attack type: Mass shooting
- Weapons: vz. 58 assault rifle, shotgun, 9mm Browning Hi-Power handgun
- Deaths: 8
- Injuries: 19
- Perpetrators: Ulster Freedom Fighters/Ulster Defence Association North Antrim & Londonderry Brigade

The Greysteel massacre was a mass shooting that took place on the evening of 30 October 1993 in Greysteel, County Londonderry, Northern Ireland. Members of the Ulster Defence Association (UDA), a loyalist paramilitary group, opened fire on civilians in a crowded pub during a Halloween party, killing eight and wounding nineteen. The pub was targeted because it was frequented by Catholics, though two of the victims were Protestant. The group claimed responsibility using their cover name "Ulster Freedom Fighters", saying the attack was revenge for the Shankill Road bombing by the Provisional IRA a week earlier. Four men were sentenced to life imprisonment for the massacre but were released in 2000 under the terms of the Good Friday Agreement.

== Background ==
On 23 October 1993, an IRA bomb prematurely exploded as the bombers were carrying it into a fishmongers on the Shankill Road, Belfast. The IRA's intended target was a meeting of UDA leaders, including brigadier Johnny Adair, which was to take place in a room above the shop. Unknown to the IRA, the meeting had been rescheduled. Eight Protestant civilians, a UDA member, and one of the IRA bombers were killed in the blast. This became known as the Shankill Road bombing.

The UDA launched several "revenge attacks" for the bombing. Later that day, they fatally shot a Catholic delivery driver after luring him to a bogus call at Vernon Court, Belfast. On 26 October, the UDA shot dead another two Catholic civilians and wounded five in an attack at the Council Depot at Kennedy Way, Belfast.

== Planning ==
The order for the attack came from the UDA leadership, and it is believed Greysteel was chosen partly because it was well away from Belfast, where security force activity was intense after the Shankill bombing. Those involved in planning and organising it included Billy McFarland, 'Brigadier' of the UDA's North Antrim & Londonderry Brigade. Stephen Irwin, Geoffrey Deeney, and Torrens Knight, all members of the brigade, were to carry out the shooting. The gunmen were first briefed on the plans for the massacre on 27 October in an office owned by the Ulster Democratic Party at Bond's Place, Derry.

Before the massacre, the gunmen went to the pub to familiarise themselves with the layout and choose the best positions from which to shoot. Knight made Irwin and Deeney rehearse the shooting in the office at Bond's Place. The gunmen would drive to the pub in an Opel Kadett with UDA member Brian McNeill driving a 'scout car' in front.

== Massacre ==
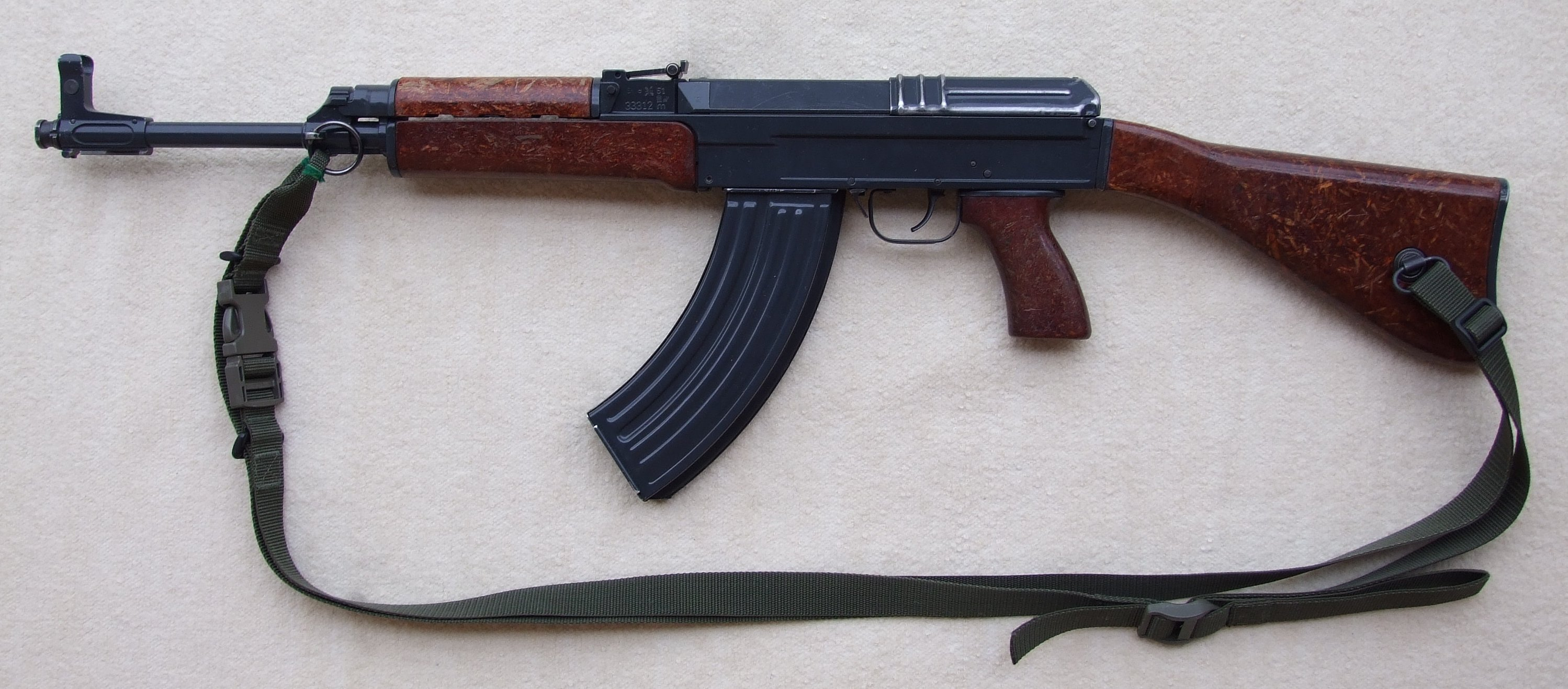
A vz. 58 assault rifle, like that used by Stephen Irwin in the Greysteel massacre.

Just before 10 pm on Saturday 30 October, the three gunmen, wearing blue boiler suits and balaclavas, entered the Rising Sun Bar in Greysteel. There were at least 70 people inside attending a Halloween party and at first some believed the men were playing a Halloween prank. Stephen Irwin yelled "trick or treat" as he opened fire with a vz. 58 assault rifle on the packed crowd in the lounge. He kept shooting until the magazine emptied, quickly reloaded, and continued shooting. Geoffrey Deeney opened fire with a 9mm handgun at a fleeing woman, but it jammed after one shot. Torrens Knight, armed with a shotgun, guarded the entrance while the shooting was taking place. There was panic and screaming as people scrambled for cover and women pleaded for mercy. The scene in the Rising Sun was described as "hell-like"; bodies lay everywhere and the lounge and dancefloor were covered with blood and broken glass.

The gunmen, laughing, then made their escape in the Opel Kadett driven by Knight. While driving away from Greysteel, the getaway car's wing mirror was hit by a police car speeding towards the scene. The gunmen drove to a pick-up point near Eglinton, where they met McNeill and burned the car.

Seven people were killed outright and nineteen were wounded, with another later dying of his wounds. The dead were Karen Thompson (19), Steven Mullan (20), Moira Duddy (59), Joseph McDermott (60), James Moore (81), John Moyne (50), John Burns (54), and Victor Montgomery (76). Six of those killed were Catholic civilians and two were Protestant civilians.

The following day, the UDA claimed responsibility for the attack using the cover name "Ulster Freedom Fighters" (UFF). Its statement said that the "Greysteel raid" was "the continuation of our threats against the nationalist electorate that they would pay a heavy price for last Saturday's slaughter of nine Protestants". A West Belfast UDA member claimed that his organisation "had information that senior IRA men drank in the Rising Sun... Unfortunately they were not there on Halloween but our boys acted on the briefing they had been given". Afterwards, the gunmen were said to have boasted about the killings.

There was "considerable resentment" in Greysteel after the Ulster Unionist MP for the area, William Ross, didn't attend any of the funerals of the victims. Ross explained his absence by citing the angry reception Social Democratic and Labour Party MP Joe Hendron received while visiting the site of the Shankill Road bombing.

== Convictions ==
The UDA members involved were arrested shortly after the massacre. RUC officers interrogating Irwin showed him photographs of dead bodies the crime scene, as well as photos from an autopsy of one of the victims. During their first court appearance, Knight was filmed laughing, taunting, and shouting abuse at the victims' relatives as he was led from the building. In February 1995, Irwin, Deeney, Knight, and McNeill were sentenced to life imprisonment for their involvement in the attack. Knight was also convicted for the Castlerock killings. In 2000, they were released early, along with other paramilitary prisoners, under the terms of the Good Friday Agreement. Irwin called the massacre "payback" and said he had "no remorse". After their release, both Irwin and Knight are believed to have joined the Neo-Nazi militant group Combat 18.

In 2005, Irwin received a four-year prison sentence for slashing a football fan with a Stanley knife during a riot at the Irish Cup final, which resulted in his victim requiring almost 200 stitches. The additional convictions for wounding with intent and possession of an offensive weapon meant that he also now had to serve the eight life sentences he received for the Greysteel massacre. In 2006, he abandoned an appeal against the sentences. In September 2013, Irwin was released from prison a second time after applying to the Sentence Review Commissioners for early release. The commissioners ruled his application should be granted and he was released immediately.

== Later developments ==
There have been claims in the media that Knight was a paid informer for MI5. Knight denied the claims. The investigators did not find any evidence that Knight was protected from the law.

In 2023, Tyler Hoey was selected as a DUP candidate to contest the Mid and East Antrim Council elections. In 2020, Hoey 'liked' a social media post commemorating the Greysteel massacre, which stated, "On this day 27 years ago, An Ulster Freedom Fighters Active Service Unit from North Antrim-Londonderry Brigade 'Trick or Treated' its way into the republican Rising Sun bar in Greysteel in order to gain revenge for the Shankill Bombing. Spirit of '93". Following this revelation, DUP leader Jeffrey Donaldson said that Hoey "deeply regrets some of the things that he said in the past" and that he is "entitled to a second chance".

The pub is still open in Greysteel. There is a memorial to the victims outside the building that says: May their sacrifice be our path to peace.

== See also ==
- Loughinisland massacre, a UVF mass shooting in June 1994
- Timeline of Ulster Defence Association actions
