= 1993 Castlerock killings =

1993 UDA shooting in Castlerock

Castlerock killings
- Part of the Troubles
- Location: Gortree Park, Castlerock, Northern Ireland
- Date: 25 March 1993
- Attack type: Shooting
- Deaths: 4
- Injuries: 1
- Perpetrator: Ulster Defence Association

The Castlerock killings took place on 25 March 1993 in the village of Castlerock, County Londonderry, Northern Ireland. Members of the Ulster Defence Association (UDA), a loyalist paramilitary group, shot dead three Catholic civilians and a Provisional Irish Republican Army (IRA) member as they arrived for work in a van. Another was wounded. The "Ulster Freedom Fighters" (UFF) claimed it had targeted an IRA member and his "accomplices". A UDA member was later imprisoned for his part in the attack and in the Greysteel massacre several months later, but was released in 2000 under the terms of the Good Friday Agreement.

== Shooting ==
The five men were builders and had been renovating houses in the Gortree Park housing estate for some months. As they parked their van on Freehall Road, another van pulled up alongside it. Two gunmen, wearing black balaclavas and combat jackets, got out and opened fire on the workers with handguns. One stood in front of the workers' van and shot through the windscreen. One of the workers fell out of the passenger door and the gunman continued to shoot at him. The other gunman opened the side door and fired on the workers in the back. Witnesses stated that one of the gunmen was firing two handguns at the same time.

Those killed were Catholic civilians James McKenna (52), Gerard Dalrymple (58) and Noel O'Kane (20), and Provisional IRA member James Kelly (25). The only survivor, Gerard McEldowney (36), had climbed over the front seat into the back of the van when the shooting started, but was shot in the thigh. He wedged himself between two metal toolboxes, shielding him from further gunfire.

The gunmen drove off toward Castlerock before doing a U-turn and passing their victims again. Witnesses said the driver leaned out the window and shouted "Up the UFF!" as he drove past. The van used by the gunmen was found burnt out two miles from the attack.

== Aftermath ==
The UDA claimed responsibility for the attack using the cover name "Ulster Freedom Fighters" (UFF). They stated they had "executed" IRA member James Kelly and his "accomplices". The IRA later confirmed that Kelly was one of its members, but none of the other victims had any paramilitary links. Sinn Féin councillor Patsy Groogan said the men were regularly stopped and harassed by the security forces and that he had "no doubt that this behaviour played a part in targeting these men for assassination".

Later in the day, the UDA shot dead a Catholic civilian and wounded another at Dairy Farm Shopping Centre in Belfast.

The weapons were later used by the same gang in carrying out the Halloween Greysteel massacre at the Rising Sun pub on 31 October 1993. It has been claimed that one of the gang was an informer and protected by RUC Special Branch. Torrens Knight received eight life sentences for the Greysteel massacre, together with four more for the Castlerock killings. He served seven years in the Maze Prison, until 2000, before paramilitary prisoners were granted a general release under the Belfast Agreement.

== See also ==
- Timeline of Ulster Defence Association actions
