= Greysteel =

Village in County Londonderry, Northern Ireland

Coordinates: 55.031667°N 7.120556°W

Greysteel: Irish: Glas-stiall
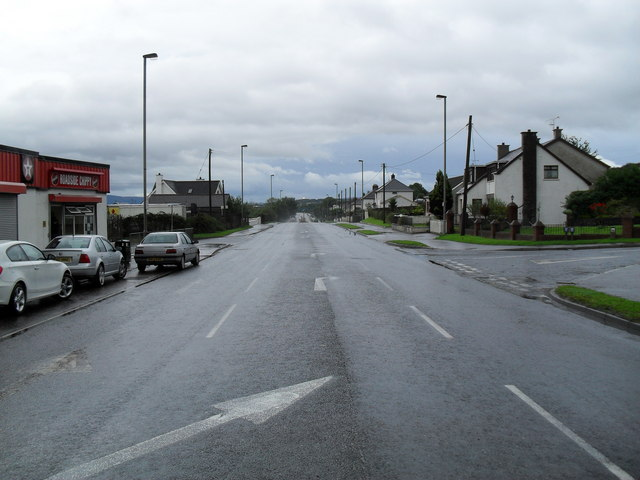
- Clooney Road, on the A2

- Location within Northern Ireland
- Population: 1,418
- District: Causeway Coast and Glens
- County: County Londonderry
- Country: Northern Ireland
- Sovereign state: United Kingdom
- Post town: LONDONDERRY
- Postcode district: BT47
- Dialling code: 028
- Police: Northern Ireland
- Fire: Northern Ireland
- Ambulance: Northern Ireland
- UK Parliament: East Londonderry
- NI Assembly: East Londonderry

Greysteel or Gresteel is a village in County Londonderry, Northern Ireland. It lies 9 miles (14 km) to the east of Derry and 7 miles (11 km) to the west of Limavady on the main A2 coast road between Limavady and Derry, overlooking Lough Foyle. In the 2021 Census it had a population of 1,418 people. It is situated within Causeway Coast and Glens district.

== History ==
The village lies mostly within the townlands of Gresteel More and Gresteel Beg. The name "Greysteel" may be a part-translation of the Irish Glas-stiall, meaning "grey strip (of land)", and the Placenames Database of Ireland gives this as the Irish name of the village. An older English name for the area was "Glasteele".

=== The Troubles ===
During the Troubles, nine people were killed in the Greysteel area:

- On 14 November 1976, Jim Loughrey was shot dead by loyalists at his home.
- On 30 October 1993, members of the Ulster Defence Association carried out a mass shooting at the Rising Sun public house, killing eight civilians. This became known as the Greysteel massacre.

== Places of interest ==
- Nearby Faughanvale Old church dates back to the medieval period and is dedicated to Saint Canice.

== Transport ==
The village is adequately served in terms of public transport and City of Derry Airport is located 4 km to the west.

== Sport ==
- Faughanvale GAC is the local Gaelic Athletic Association club.

== 2001 Census ==
Greysteel is classified as a village by the NI Statistics and Research Agency (NISRA) (i.e. with a population between 1,000 and 2,250 people). On Census day (29 April 2001) there were 1,229 people living in Greysteel. Of these:

- 25.4% were aged under 16 years and 11.7% were aged 60 and over
- 50.2% of the population were male and 49.8% were female
- 96.6% were from a Catholic background and 2.9% were from a Protestant background
- 0.8% of people aged 16–74 were unemployed.

For more details see: NI Neighbourhood Information Service

== See also ==
- List of towns and villages in Northern Ireland
