= Dunboy =

Dunboy may refer to:

- Dunboy Castle, County Cork, Ireland
- Siege of Dunboy, in 1602
