= James Archer (Jesuit) =

Irish Roman Catholic priest (1550–1620)

- Born: 1550; Kilkenny, Ireland
- Died: 15 February 1620 (aged 69–70); Santiago de Compostela, Spain

James Archer (1550–1620) was an Irish Roman Catholic priest of the Society of Jesus who played a highly controversial role in both the Nine Years War and in the military resistance to both the House of Tudor's religious persecution of the Catholic Church in Ireland and the Elizabethan wars against both Gaelic Ireland and the Irish clans. During the final decade of the reign of Queen Elizabeth I, Archer became a leading figure of hate in the anti-Catholic propaganda of the English government, but his most lasting achievement was his role in the establishment and strengthening of the Irish Colleges in Catholic Europe during the Counter-Reformation.

== Early life ==
Archer came from an Anglo-Norman family in County Kilkenny. He may have attended the local grammar school, Kilkenny College, which had been established in 1555 under Peter White, a fellow of the University of Oxford. David Wolfe, papal nuncio to Ireland, had been evangelizing in south Leinster in this period, although there is no evidence that he came in contact with Archer. Archer entered the seminary college of Louvain around the year 1564, when Nicholas Sanders was in charge. In his maturity, he was described as tall, of dark complexion, with a long, thin face. He was ordained in Louvain in 1577.

== Irish mission ==
Archer took a degree of Master of Arts and returned to Ireland in March 1577. Later the same year his presence about Waterford and Clonmel was reported to the queen's secretary, Francis Walsingham, by the President of Munster, William Drury. In the report, Archer was described as a "principal prelate" and "a detestable enemy to the Word of God". Drury also claimed that en route to Ireland Archer had "taught all the way betwixt Rye and Bristol [in England] against our religion and caused a number to despair".

In 1579, the rebel James Fitzmaurice Fitzgerald landed a papal invasion force at Smerwick in modern-day County Kerry in the company of Nicolas Sanders. Fitzmaurice proceeded to Holy Cross in County Tipperary via Kilmallock, and it is possible that Archer, who was in the vicinity, was attached to his forces. Fitzmaurice was killed in action during this journey.

At about this time Archer is said to have attended one of the Irish Catholic Martyrs, Blessed Conn O'Rourke, on the evening of the latter's execution for high treason at Kilmallock. Another source asserts that Archer was imprisoned at Westminster sometime after, but there is no substantial evidence for this.

== Jesuit ==
Archer was received as a novice into the Society of Jesus at Rome in 1581. He then spent two and a half years at the Roman College, studying logic, physics, and moral and controversial theology. In a report to the Jesuit General in 1584, he was described as physically strong, although choleric and melancholy in temperament; he had not distinguished himself in his studies, and was reckoned, "suitable to hear confessions".

In 1585 Archer was sent to the University of Pont-à-Mousson, where a joint Scots-Irish major seminary had lately been established. He studied scholastic theology for two years while ministering to the students and hearing confessions. In an unenthusiastic report delivered in 1587 – describing him as "bilious" – it was suggested that he was suited to become a preacher in his native country.

== Low Countries ==
In 1587 Archer was sent to the Low Countries to serve as chaplain to the Spanish forces under the Duke of Parma during the Anglo-Spanish war (1585–1604).William Stanley, commander of a regiment of Irish soldiers under English crown authority, had just surrendered the Belgian city of Deventer to Parma and committed himself and his men to the service of the Spanish king. Archer spent his time hearing confessions from the Irish soldiers and busying himself with administrative duties. Expectations ran high among the forces for an invasion of England, but were defeated in the following year when the Spanish Armada was driven from the Dutch coast.

As Spain gradually regained its strategic initiative over England, Archer was reported to be following Stanley's regiment throughout 1590. In September of the following year, he was at Brussels, recovering from an illness. His superiors still considered him of middling ability, and the impression of melancholy and irascibility persisted. A request was then received from the Archbishop of Armagh, Edmund MacGauran, for his participation in a Jesuit mission to Ireland.

== Salamanca ==
Archer remained in the Low Countries throughout 1591, then spent three months at Calais before he sailed to Spain, where he became the first rector of the Irish College at Salamanca after a visit to Philip II's court at Madrid. In the following years, he visited court regularly in an effort to secure scarce funding for the institution. By this time his superiors had altered their opinion of him to such a degree that he was considered ripe for promotion.

== Plots and allegations ==
In 1594 Archer became involved in controversy, when it was alleged that he had plotted two years previously with other Jesuits and Stanley to assassinate Queen Elizabeth I. The chosen assassin had been Hugh Cahill, a Tipperary man, who confessed that he was paid to hang about the court at London, on the off chance that the queen might present herself as a target, and then stab her. The confession had been obtained under torture by Richard Topcliffe, and further information came from an agent of Robert Cecil, secretary to the queen. At this time, Archer was also implicated in a plot to torch the French and English ships at Dieppe.

The merits of the allegations are impossible to judge, although it seems clear that Archer was acquainted with Cahill. The assassination plot was just one of many against the queen that received credence during the final decade of her reign. One sceptic has pointed out that the evidence only emerged once Father Robert Persons had published his A Conference about the Next Succession to the Crown of England. The book does appear to have alarmed Elizabeth's advisers, and from that date onward the flow of supposed plots against the queen's life became steady. In 1601 Cecil himself was accused of treason at the trial of the Earl of Essex on the basis of his reading of Person's book, but survived this twist and went on to secure the succession of James I upon the queen's death two years later.

== Ireland ==
In 1596 Archer returned to Ireland, landing in the southeast (at either Waterford or Wexford), with a view to re-establishing the Jesuit mission there and to raise funds for the college at Salamanca. The brief visit became an enforced stay of four years, and it was soon decided at Rome to make him superior of the new mission. His presence came to the attention of the Lord Deputy of Ireland, Sir William Russell, and the government regarded him with such suspicion that a reward was offered for his capture.

By August 1598 it seems Archer had fled north to Ulster, where he joined the rebels as the Nine Years war entered its most active phase. It is probable that, following the English defeat at the battle of the Yellow Ford later in that year, he decided to commit himself to the cause of Hugh O'Neill. With this newfound authority, he returned south to more familiar territory.

During the rest of the war reports of Archer's exploits were legion, so that an aura of mystery and almost awe was attached to his name, and government officers referred to him as the "arch traitor" and the "arch devil". However exaggerated the reports, it is certain that he was present at the taking of the Earl of Ormond in 1599, when the rebel O'Mores lured the most powerful nobleman in the country to a parley in a remote part of Carlow and seized him by treachery. The earl spent a substantial period in custody, with Archer attending on him regularly, at a time when the English presence in Ireland was in jeopardy.

Ormond's seizure – which followed the departure from Ireland of Robert Devereux, 2nd Earl of Essex after a disappointing campaign (see Essex in Ireland) – was put down by the Lord President of Munster, Sir George Carew, to Archer's influence. Upon Ormond's release some months later – unharmed – the earl described Archer as an "odious traitor". It may be that Ormond himself was complicit in the act, with some suggestion that he was indulging in a long game to ensure his power against the hazard of an outright defeat of the English and the removal of their influence from Ireland. One source later claimed that Ormond had converted to the Catholic faith during his captivity, and Archer is reported to have declared that the earl would be made king of Ireland upon Spanish intervention. This episode still defies satisfactory explanation.

== Spanish intervention ==
In October 1599 Archer left Ireland for Rome, where he effectively acted as O'Neill's envoy. Pope Clement VIII delayed the appointment of a nuncio to Ireland, but at Madrid plans for an Irish expedition were given renewed attention upon the agreement of peace between Spain and France. In early 1601 Philip III of Spain opted to send an armada with a force of 6000 soldiers, and the Dublin government began preparations to meet the Spanish effort.

During the spring and summer of 1601, Carew and Cecil received reports of the activities of Archer, who had just arrived in Spain. Despite the appointment of a Jesuit nuncio – a neutral who was averse to a militant mission in Ireland – Archer managed to defer service in the seminary at Salamanca and involved himself in the Irish expedition instead. He proposed a landing in Munster – in the south – while the commander of the expedition, Juan del Águila, insisted on one in Ulster. In consultation, O'Neill and the northern clans recommended a compromise: a landing along the coast between the Shannon Estuary and Lough Foyle in the extreme north.

In September Archer, with the assistance of Jesuit lay brother and future Irish Catholic Martyr Dominic Collins, set sail with the armada, which bore over 4,500 soldiers and was bound for the port of Cork, or its alternative at Kinsale – both destinations lay at the extreme south of the island.

== Battle of Kinsale ==
On arriving in Munster in September 1601, both Archer and Juan del Aguila discovered that the province lay docile under Lord President of Munster Sir George Carew's domination and control. This was largely due to the recent capture and imprisonment of both Fínghin mac Donncha Mac Carthaig Mór and the Súgán Earl of Desmond.

Meanwhile, Archer vouched with del Aguíla for local Irish clan chief, Donal Cam O'Sullivan Beare, who offered to raise his clan and block the march from the Pale of the Crown's principal army under Lord Mountjoy, but del Aguila declined.

The Spanish instead occupied the walled town of Kinsale, which was almost immediately surrounded by Lord Mountjoy in a siege that was to last three months. Seeking to rescue Juan del Águila's forces and break the siege, the anti-Tudor coalition of the Irish clans of Ulster under the leadership of Aodh Mór Ó Néill and Red Hugh O'Donnell marched across the whole length of Ireland through extremely bitter winter conditions, but were catastrophically defeated by the English cavalry in December at the battle of Kinsale. Juan del Aguila then surrendered Kinsale on terms and departed with his forces for Spain.

Determined to seek further Spanish reinforcements, Archer left Kinsale and joined the forces of Donal Cam O'Sullivan Beare, who were still holding out with Spanish backing further down the coast at Dunboy Castle. To Juan del Águila's fury, Archer overruled the local Spanish commander and announced, in violation of the surrender terms negotiated at Kinsale, that Dunboy Castle would not be surrendered but that Clan O'Sullivan would continue holding it in the name of King Philip III of Spain. Juan del Águila was reportedly so incensed that he offered to help the English take the castle himself.

In a letter to Robert Cecil, Lord President of Munster Sir George Carew, "could not forbear", according to Irish historian Proinsias Ó Fionnagáin, "voicing his almost superstitious fear of Archer". Carew commented, "Archer the priest conjures the foul weather, which I do partly believe, for the old men have never seen the like in May. If he remains in Dunboy I hope to conjure his head in a halter. He hath a fellow devil with him, one Dominic Collins, a friar, who in his youth was a scholar and brother to him that was last year mayor of Youghal. Every week that traitorly priest administers the sacrament to them; yet I hope to sow such sedition amongst them that they will break."

Consideration was being given at the court of King Philip III to a further expedition, and Archer sailed for Spain on 6 July 1602 (just before the Siege of Dunboy and the capture and execution by hanging of Brother Dominic Collins) to report on the state of Ireland.

At the Spanish Court, Archer railed against Juan del Aguila. He accused the Spanish commander of cowardice, vacillation, and dereliction of duty by both refusing to heed the advice of local Irish clans and refusing to sally forth and meet his Ulster allies at the critical point. Archer concluded, "[He] has the reputation in other parts of being a brave soldier, but [in Ireland he was] cowardly and timorous."

For his part, the commander argued against giving any further aid to the Irish clans and presented the King with a forged letter – leaked to him by Sir George Carew – purporting to be from Archer, in which the priest was supposed to have sought a full pardon from Queen Elizabeth. The arguments dragged on, but by March 1603, Archer appears to have been vindicated while del Aguila was placed under house arrest by the King.

Archer's hopes of aid continued, but after the Queen's death in March 1603 Aodh Mór Ó Néill accepted terms of surrender from Lord Mountjoy. Upon the accession of King James I to the English throne in May a new dispensation was in place, and in the following year, a peace was concluded between the English and Spanish Governments. Juan del Aguila was eventually restored to favour, and in Ireland Sir George Carew ordered all Roman Catholic priests to depart the kingdom. Archer repeatedly sought to return to Ireland, and for years afterwards his imminent arrival was touted in anti-Catholic propaganda by the English government, but the remainder of his life was spent as an exile in Catholic Europe.

== The Irish College ==
Archer was appointed prefect of mission by the Jesuit father-general, Claudio Acquaviva, with the task of coordinating the work of the Irish colleges in Iberia. In the Irish College at Salamanca, allegations had arisen that the Jesuits were discriminating against Gaels in favour of Old English students from those parts of Ireland more loyal to the English crown. A Spanish rector was appointed after a royal inquiry, but Archer intervened, seeking greater safeguards for students from the Gaeltachtaí, and was granted his wish by the king. In 1610 the Irish College at Salamanca was raised to a Royal College.

Archer spent much time at court, and his approach to his responsibilities is summed up in the following quote, concerning the opportunity afforded through the running of the seminaries: "if we do not take advantage of it we shall do nothing heroic or outstanding".

== Decline and death ==
Archer began to suffer ill health in 1608, and little is known of him until 1613, when he stayed two months at Bordeaux on seminary business. He appears to have commanded respect for his devoted religious observance.

In 1615 Archer again sought to return to Ireland, but his request was denied by the new Jesuit father—general, Mutius Vitelleschi. He spent the last years of his life at Santiago de Compostela as the spiritual father to the seminarians. On 15 February 1620, he died at the Irish college there.

== Legacy ==
Archer became notorious for his contributions to the rising of the Irish clans during the Nine Years' War. However, his greatest achievement was arguably in the establishment of the Irish Colleges to train students for the priesthood, which went from strength to strength in the succeeding centuries and contributed greatly to the Counter-Reformation.

According to Des Ekin, "One fascinating but evidence weak theory encountered by this author is that Fr. Archer was actually a deep-cover agent provocateur planted by the Queen's spymaster. Archer was, after all, a man from a solid Old English Establishment background who secretly despised the Irish as 'barbarians'. In this theory of events, the entire plot to kill Elizabeth was a fabrication by the Queen's spymasters designed to establish Archer's credentials and to smoke out Irish conspirators, and the English depiction of him as a super-nimble, supernatural force was an attempt to explain his all too convenient narrow escapes. Archer mysteriously turns up everywhere, from the Yellow Ford and Kinsale to Dunboy, and always gets away. And it was Archer, remember, who was most vociferous in urging the Spanish to sally out from Kinsale in response to what Águila believed was an English trick. It is an intriguing hypothesis – but there doesn't seem to be any real evidence to back it up."

== Folklore ==
- According to historian and folklorist Tony Nugent, James Archer and Dominic Collins are associated in local Irish folklore with a rock located in a mountain pass between Kenmare, County Kerry and Bantry, County Cork. The rock, which is known in Munster Irish as Léim an tSagairt ("The Priest's Leap"), is alleged to be where Archer, Collins, or in some accounts both, leapt an enormous distance on horseback to escape pursuit by a posse of Elizabethan soldiers. A metal cross now marks the site.

== Sources ==
- McCoog, Thomas M. The Society of Jesus in Ireland, Scotland and England 1598-1606 Leiden 2017
- Thomas Morrissey, James Archer of Kilkenny: an Elizabethan Jesuit (Dublin, 1979) ISBN 0-906665-01-9
