= List of massacres in Ireland =

This is a list of incidents that happened on the island of Ireland (encompassing what exists today as the Republic of Ireland and Northern Ireland) and are commonly called massacres. All those that took place during the late 20th century were part of the Troubles.

Date	Name	Location	Deaths	Injuries	Notes
c. 900	Simmonscourt Castle massacre	Simmonscourt Castle	~600		A massacre by Vikings; bodies unearthed in 1879 from a mound and reburied in Donnybrook Cemetery. The mound was on the site of modern Ailesbury Road, east of the River Dodder.
928	Dunmore Cave massacre	Dunmore Cave, County Kilkenny	~1,000		A massacre by Vikings, led by Godfrey of the Uí Ímair; recorded in the Annals of the Four Masters. A large quantity of human bones was found in the cave in 1869.
9 June 1329	Braganstown massacre	Branganstown, County Louth	~160		John de Bermingham and around 160 of his followers were massacred by a mob of angry tenants, over the treatment of the tenants by de Bermingham's soldiers.
1569	Massacre of the Irish in north Kerry	North Kerry	Several hundred		In November 1569, Humphrey Gilbert campaigned in north Kerry and in the rebel fastness of Connellough woods. His soldiers routinely killed all men, women and children in their path, as well as any livestock they encountered in order to deprive the rebels of sustenance.
1574, November	Clandeboye massacre	Belfast	200		A massacre of The O'Neills of Lower Clandeboye by the English Forces of Walter Devereux, 1st Earl of Essex.
1575	Rathlin Island massacre	Rathlin Island	600+		A massacre of MacDonnell clansmen both Irish and Scottish by English forces.
1578	Massacre of Mullaghmast	Mullaghmast, County Kildare	100+		The Irish chieftains of Laois and their families were summoned to a meeting with Tudor officials and massacred.
1579, 13 November	Sack of Youghal	Youghal, County Cork	Several hundred		Youghal was an important stronghold for the English in southern Munster. During the Desmond rebellions it was sacked by the forces Gerald, 15th Earl of Desmond who massacred the English garrison, hanged the English officials and looted and abused the townspeople.
10 October 1580	Siege of Smerwick (Dún an Óir)	Ard na Caithne, County Kerry	600+		During the Second Desmond Rebellion, English Naval personnel under the command of Lord Deputy Arthur Grey slaughtered 300–700 Papal mercenaries from Spain and Italy after they had surrendered.
June 1602	Dursey Massacre	Dursey Island, off the Beara Peninsula	~300		A group of Irish soldiers and civilians taking shelter on the island during the Siege of Dunboy were attacked by English forces, and massacred despite being promised quarter.
1641	Ulster massacres	Ulster, Ireland	4,000–12,000		The Ulster Massacres were a series of massacres and resulting deaths amongst the ~4,000–12,000 Protestant settlers which took place in 1641 during the Irish Rebellion.
November 1641	Portadown massacre	Portadown	100+		O'Neill clansmen massacred as many as 100 English and Scottish Protestant planters, including women, children, and other noncombatants. The massacre took place on the banks of the River Bann.
June 1642	Baldongan massacre	Baldongan Castle, near Skerries, County Dublin	200–250		Part of the Irish Confederate Wars. After the castle was taken by Parliamentary forces, the entire garrison of Confederate forces was put to the sword.
August 1642	Second Rathlin Island Massacre	Rathlin Island	100-3,000		Covenanter Campbell soldiers of the Argyll's Foot were encouraged by their commanding officer Sir Duncan Campbell of Auchinbreck to kill the local Catholic MacDonalds, near relatives of their arch clan enemy in the Scottish Highlands Clan MacDonald. They threw scores of MacDonald women over cliffs to their deaths on rocks below.
15 September 1647	Sack of Cashel	Rock of Cashel	almost 1,000		A massacre of English Royalists, plus MacCarthy and O'Brien clansmen, during the Irish Confederate Wars.
11 September 1649	Siege of Drogheda	Drogheda, County Louth	3,552–6,400		A massacre committed by the New Model Army and its commander Oliver Cromwell during the Eleven Years War; also called "the Drogheda Massacre." Drogheda had been defended by a garrison of English and Irish Royalists, many of whom belonged to the Anglican Communion. When the city fell, Cromwell's Army, which was enraged by events like the Portadown massacre, made no distinction between captured soldiers and civilian noncombatants and razed even the churches where civilians took shelter. In a subsequent report to Parliament, Cromwell called the massacre "the vengeance of God against these barbarous wretches."
11 October 1649	Sack of Wexford	Wexford, County Wexford	3,500		Following a siege by Cromwell's New Model, Parliamentary troops broke into Wexford after negotiations with the commander of the garrison, David Sinnot, broke down – massacring soldiers and civilians alike. Much of the town was burned and the harbour was destroyed.
February 1650	Donore Castle massacre	Donore Castle, County Meath	50		During the Cromwellian wars, the MacGeoghegan (Mac Eochagáin) took refuge in Donore Castle. It was captured by Sir John Reynolds who put most of those inside to death.
19 May 1798	Gibbet Rath executions	Curragh, County Kildare	300–500		part of the Irish Rebellion of 1798
1798, 25 May	Dunlavin Green executions	Dunlavin, County Wicklow	36	3	Massacre of rebel prisoners by loyalist militia. Part of the Irish Rebellion of 1798.
1798, 25 May	Carnew executions	Carnew, County Wicklow	38		part of the Irish Rebellion of 1798
1798, 5 June	Scullabogue massacre	Scullabogue, County Wexford	100–200	2	part of the Irish Rebellion of 1798
1798, 20 June	Wexford massacre	Wexford bridge, Wexford	90–100		part of the Irish Rebellion of 1798
1834, 18 December	Rathcormac massacre	Bartlemy, County Cork	20	45	Massacre by British soldiers and the Irish Constabulary as part of the Tithe War.
1887, 9 September	Mitchelstown massacre	Mitchelstown, County Cork	3	Several	British soldiers fired into a crowd of Irish civilians during the Land War.
1914, 26 July	Bachelor's Walk massacre	Bachelor's Walk, Dublin	4	32	35 people were shot and 1 bayoneted by British troops on Bachelor's Walk, Dublin.
1916, 28–29 April	North King Street massacre	Dublin	15–16	unknown	British soldiers of the South Staffordshire Regiment raided houses on North King Street and killed 15 male civilians, part of the Easter Rising
1920, 21 November	Bloody Sunday (Croke Park massacre)	Dublin	14	60–70	part of the Irish War of Independence; Spectators were shot by members of the Royal Irish Constabulary and the Auxiliary Division at a Gaelic football match. This was the first Irish mass-killing to be called "Bloody Sunday".
1921, 10 July	Bloody Sunday (Lower Falls massacre)	Belfast	17	Over 70	one of a series of killings by Protestant extremists, the IRA and the Royal Irish Constabulary after the Irish War of Independence; named "Belfast's Bloody Sunday", until 1972.
1922, 1 April	Arnon Street killings	Belfast, Northern Ireland	6	1	A mass shooting by the Police Specials under command of Senior Officers; part of the Irish War of Independence.
1922, 26–28 April	Dunmanway killings	Dunmanway, County Cork	13	1	A mass shooting of Protestant civilians alleged to be informers by the "old" IRA.
1923, 7–12 March	Ballyseedy massacre	Ballyseedy, Caherciveen Killarney	17	2	19 prisoners of war were tied to landmines and blown up in three separate incidents by the Irish Army.
31 March 1926	La Mancha massacre	Malahide, County Dublin	6	0	Residents of a mansion named "La Mancha;" four members of the McDonnell family and two of their employees, who were poisoned with arsenic and beaten to death; the house was then set on fire. Their gardener Henry McCabe was controversially convicted of their murders and hanged.
3-5 July 1970	Falls Curfew (or known locally as the Battle of the Lower Falls)	Falls Road, Belfast, Northern Ireland	4	60	During a gun battle against both the Official IRA and Provisional IRA the British Army shot dead three civilians and ran one down.
1971, 9–11 August	Ballymurphy massacre	Belfast, Northern Ireland	11	unknown	A mass shooting by the Parachute Regiment, British Army.
1971, 23 October	1971 Newry Killings	Newry, County Down, Northern Ireland	3	0	Undercover British soldiers shot dead three civilians in disputed circumstances, it appeared to be a case of mistaken identity
1971, 2 November	Red Lion Pub bombing	Belfast	3	30	A bombing by the IRA's Belfast Brigade.
1971, 4 December	McGurk's Bar bombing	Belfast, Northern Ireland	15	17	A bombing by Ulster loyalists. Ulster Volunteer Force
1972, 30 January	Bloody Sunday (Bogside massacre)	Derry, Northern Ireland	14	17	A mass shooting by the British Army's Parachute Regiment. Part of "the Troubles"; the third Irish mass-killing to be called "Bloody Sunday".
1972, 9 July	Springhill massacre	Springhill estate West Belfast, Northrern Ireland	5	2	The British Army shot seven unarmed Catholics near a timber yard in Belfast, five of whom died, including a Catholic priest and a 13-year-old girl
1972, 21 July	Bloody Friday	Belfast	9, including two British soldiers	130	Within the space of 75 minutes, the Provisional IRA detonated 22 bombs in Belfast. Nine people were killed (including two British soldiers and one Ulster Defence Association member) while 130 were injured
1972, 31 July	Claudy bombing	Claudy	9	30	Three car bombs were detonated in the early morning on Main Street, Claudy, killing 9 civilians, including three children. The Provisional IRA are believed to be responsible for what became known as "Bloody Monday". Part of "the Troubles".
1972, 20 December	Top of the Hill bar shooting	Derry	5	4	At 10:30 p.m., two Ulster Defence Association gunmen entered the Top of the Hill bar in Derry and opened fire, killing five patrons and injuring several others. The shooting is believed to be revenge for the IRA's killing of UDR soldier George Hamilton earlier that day.
1974, 17 May	Dublin and Monaghan bombings	Dublin and Monaghan	34	300	Three bombs exploded in Dublin and a fourth exploded in Monaghan, carried out by the Glenanne gang; included British soldiers from the Ulster Defence Regiment (UDR), police officers from the Royal Ulster Constabulary (RUC), and members of the Mid-Ulster Brigade of the Ulster Volunteer Force (UVF). The attacks exclusively targeted civilians.
1975, 31 July	Miami Showband killings	Buskhill, County Down, Northern Ireland	5	2	A botched attack by the UVF. Part of "the Troubles".
1975, 13 August	Bayardo Bar attack	Belfast, Northern Ireland	5	50	A shooting and bombing at the Loyalist-owned Bayardo's Bar in Belfast. Three members of the IRA were convicted over the attack.
1976, 4 January	Reavey and O'Dowd killings	Whitecross, County Armagh	6	1	A massacre of two families by the Ulster Volunteer Force.
1976, 5 January	Kingsmill massacre	Kingsmill, County Armagh, Northern Ireland	10	1	A sectarian massacre of Protestant workers. A report by the Historical Inquiries Team found that Provisional IRA members were responsible. Part of "the Troubles".
1978, 17 February	La Mon restaurant bombing	Gransha, County Down, Northern Ireland	12	30	Massacre conducted by the IRA. A large incendiary bomb, containing a napalm-like substance, was detonated outside one of the restaurant windows. Part of "the Troubles".
1987, 8 May	Loughgall Ambush	Loughgall, County Armagh	8 IRA Volunteers 1 civilian	1	British Army SAS ambush killed eight experienced IRA volunteers, making it the IRA's biggest loss of life from one incident since the 1920s, two Catholic civilians were also shot by the SAS in the ambush, one of whom died from his injuries, referred to by Irish republicans as massacre as a number of the IRA men shot dead were unarmed while trying to surrender.
1987, 8 November	Remembrance Day bombing	Enniskillen, Northern Ireland	12	63	A mass civilian bombing by the IRA. Part of "the Troubles".
1988, 16 March	Milltown Cemetery attack	Belfast, Northern Ireland	3	60+	A gun and grenade attack on Catholic civilians and IRA supporters carried out by UDA member Michael Stone. Part of "the Troubles".
1992, 17 January	Teebane bombing	County Tyrone Northern Ireland	8	6	A roadside bombing carried out by the IRA on a van transporting workers hired by the British Army.
1992, 5 February	Sean Graham bookmakers' shooting	Belfast Northern Ireland	5	9	A mass shooting by the UDA.
1993, 25 March	Castlerock killings	Castlerock, Northern Ireland	4	1	A mass shooting by the UDA
1993, 23 October	Shankill Road bombing	Belfast, Northern Ireland	10	57	A mass bombing by the IRA in a protestant area that killed mostly civilians. Part of "the Troubles".
1993, 30 October	Greysteel massacre	Greysteel, Northern Ireland	8	13	A shooting by the UDA. Part of "the Troubles".
1994, 18 June	Loughinisland massacre	Loughinisland, Northern Ireland	6	5	A shooting by the UVF. Part of "the Troubles".
1998, 15 August	Omagh bombing	Omagh, Northern Ireland	29	220–300	A car bomb attack carried out by the Real Irish Republican Army (RIRA)
