= Dominic Collins =

Irish Jesuit lay brother and ex-soldier

Blessed Dominic Collins S.J.
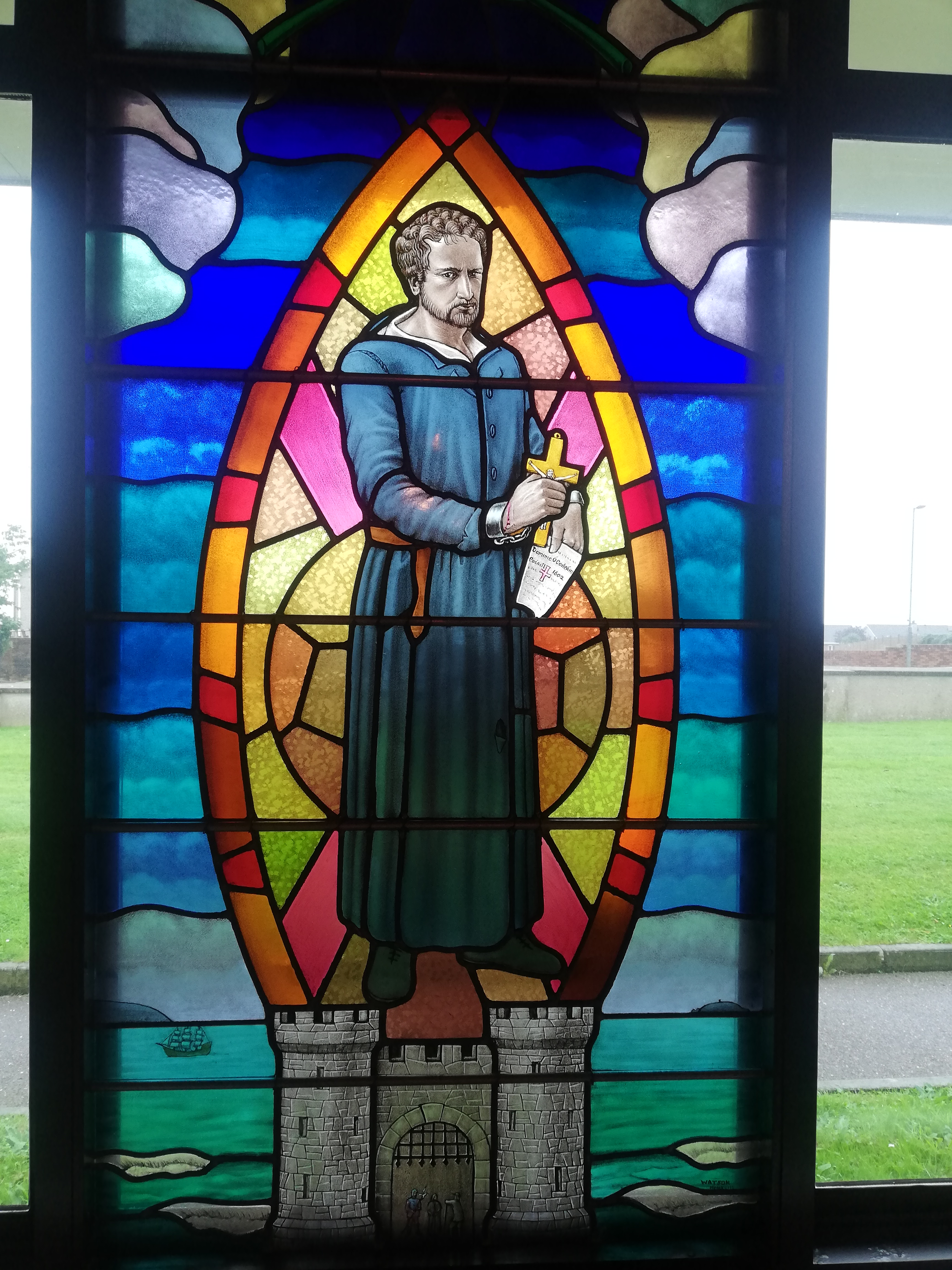
- Stained glass window depicting Collins (Church of the Holy Family, Youghal)

Martyr
- Born: 1566; Youghal, County Cork, Ireland
- Died: 31 October 1602 (aged 35–36); Youghal, County Cork, Ireland
- Venerated in: Roman Catholic Church
- Beatified: 27 September 1992, Vatican City by Pope John Paul II
- Feast: 20 June

Dominic Collins, SJ (Irish: Doiminic Ó Coileáin; 1566 – 31 October 1602) was an Irish Jesuit lay brother, an ex-soldier, who died for his Catholic faith. He was beatified by Pope John Paul II, along with 16 other Irish Catholic Martyrs, on 27 September 1993.

== Early life ==
Dominic Collins was born in 1566 into a prominent Hiberno-Norman merchant family in Youghal, County Cork, in the Kingdom of Ireland, John Collins, his father, and one of his brothers both served as Lord Mayors of the town. His mother, Felicity O'Dril, or O'Dula, was descended from a family of Gaels.

Around 1586, Collins sailed to France, landed at Les Sables d'Olonne, and traveled overland to Nantes, where he worked for three years as an inn servant. His years as an inn servant enabled Collins to acquire both the money for a horse and a working knowledge of both the French and Breton languages. In 1586, Collins joined a cavalry unit during the Brittany Campaign of the French Wars of Religion; namely, the Catholic League led by Philippe Emmanuel, Duke of Mercœur. As such, Collins was at war against both Breton Huguenots and the English and German troops who were sent to assist them. Collins' other enemy was the House of Bourbon, as the Duke de Mercoeur also sought, with both Spanish and Vatican backing, to restore the political independence of the Duchy of Brittany from the Kingdom of France. Collins was known to be an effective soldier and was promoted to the rank of Captain (and was known to the French under the nom de guerre of Capitaine de La Branche).

After personally retaking the district and chateau of Lapena from the Huguenots, Collins was appointed military governor of the territory by the Duke de Mercoeur. Henri of Navarre, the French throne's still Calvinist heir presumptive, offered Collins a bribe of 2,000 ducats to surrender the chateau and surrounding district, but was refused. Only when Collins realized that both the Catholic League and the Breton nationalist armies of the Duke de Mercoeur were collapsing, did he surrender Lapena to Spanish General Don Juan del Águila, who dispatched Collins to Hapsburg Spain via San Sebastián in the Basque Country, with a letter of recommendation to King Philip II, by whom Collins was granted a pension of 25 escudos, which was received only, "for a twelvemonth or thereabouts." Collins then transferred to the Spanish Royal Navy and was stationed at the port of La Coruña in Galicia.

== Jesuit vocation ==
During Lent of 1598, Collins met Jesuit priest Thomas White, a native of Clonmel, who had arrived at A Coruña to hear the confessions of his fellow Irishmen serving there with the Spanish Navy. Collins was convinced that their meeting was providential and White, who had previously founded the Irish College at Salamanca, has left behind a biography of Dominic Collins, which relates in considerable detail the story of the former Captain's call to the religious life. Collins had so firm a desire to become a Jesuit, that White introduced him to Alfonso Ferrer, the Jesuit Provincial of Castile.

Although he was now 32 years old, the Provincial thought it was wise to delay his Jesuit formation, perhaps to test the strength of his vocation. There were doubts too about whether Collins was well-educated enough to become a priest, but the Provincial finally relented in the face of Collins' repeated requests, as he was received as a brother-novice on 8 December 1598. He began his novitiate in the Jesuit college at Santiago de Compostela, where the annals describe Collins as, "an Irishman of distinguished parentage, comely appearance and stature", who had just, "passed thirty-two years of age", and, "had been a Captain of Duke Philip's cavalry in Brittany."

When the Jesuit College was struck by a plague, Dominic tended the victims, nursing some of them back to health and comforting the others in their last hours. A report from that time describes him as a man of sound judgement and great physical strength; mature, prudent and sociable, though inclined to be hot-tempered and obstinate. He was allowed to profess his Solemn vows in February 1601.

== Nine Years' War ==
Soon after his profession, a Spanish expedition was organised by King Philip III to assist the rising of the Irish clans during the Nine Years' War against the English-led government and in resistance to the Reformation in Ireland. James Archer, an Irish Jesuit priest assigned by the King as military chaplain to the Spanish Army, requested that Dominic Collins be assigned as his companion and assistant, due to his extensive military background. The fleet set sail on 3 September 1601 in two squadrons. The smaller part of the fleet, to which Collins was assigned, ran into bad weather and was delayed, eventually reaching Castlehaven in southwestern Cork on 1 December, the main squadron having reached Kinsale more than two months earlier.

On finally arriving in Munster, Collins discovered that the province lay docile under Lord President of Munster Sir George Carew's domination and control. This was largely due to the recent capture and imprisonment of both Fínghin mac Donncha Mac Carthaig Mór and the Súgán Earl of Desmond.

Collins and Archer vouched with del Aguíla for local Irish clan chief, Donal Cam O'Sullivan Beare, who offered to raise his clan and block the march from the Pale of the Crown's principal army under Lord Mountjoy, but del Aguila declined.

The Spanish instead occupied the walled town of Kinsale, which was almost immediately surrounded by Mountjoy in a siege that was to last three months. Seeking to rescue del Águila's forces and break the siege, the coalition of the Irish clans of Ulster marched across the whole length of Ireland through extremely bitter winter conditions, but were catastrophically defeated by the English cavalry at the Battle of Kinsale on 24 December 1601.

Juan del Aguila then surrendered Kinsale on terms. Based almost certainly upon Dominic Collins' tactical assessments, Archer immediately engaged in recrimination. He accused the Spanish commander of cowardice, vacillation, and dereliction of duty by both refusing to heed the advice of local Irish clans and refusing to sally forth and meet his Ulster allies at the critical point. Archer concluded.

Determined to continue the fight, Archer and Collins left Kinsale and joined the forces of Donal Cam O'Sullivan Beare, who were still holding out with Spanish backing further down the coast at Dunboy Castle. To Juan del Águila's fury, Archer overruled the local Spanish commander and announced, in violation of the surrender terms negotiated after Kinsale, that Dunboy Castle would not be surrendered but that Clan O'Sullivan would continue holding it in the name of King Philip III of Spain. Juan del Águila was reportedly so incensed that he offered to personally help the English take the castle.

In a letter to Robert Cecil, Sir George Carew, "could not forbear", according to Irish historian Proinsias Ó Fionnagáin, "voicing his almost superstitious fear of Archer". Carew commented, "Archer the priest conjures the foul weather, which I do partly believe, for the old men have never seen the like in May. If he remains in Dunboy I hope to conjure his head in a halter. He hath a fellow devil with him, one Dominic Collins, a friar, who in his youth was a scholar and brother to him that was last year mayor of Youghal. Every week that traitorly priest administers the sacrament to them; yet I hope to sow such sedition amongst them that they will break."

Instead of falling into Carew's hands, Archer returned to Spain to seek further reinforcements, while Collins remained behind at Dunboy Castle with 143 Irish soldiers who were besieged by 4,000 English troops. After an eleven-day siege, Dunboy fell into the hands of the English on 18 June 1602. While all other prisoners were immediately hanged en masse, Collins and two other survivors were held prisoner. They were then taken as prisoners to Shandon Castle in Cork City. There, they were tortured and the two surviving Irish soldiers were executed.

Collins, however, was far more valuable to the Queen's officials alive rather than dead. More than four months were accordingly spent deciding his fate. Determined upon the propaganda coup of having a Jesuit abjure the Catholic Faith in his very hometown, the Queen's officials removed Collins from Shandon Castle and brought him back to Youghal, a distance of 173 km. There, the Lord Deputy of Ireland, Sir Charles Blount, Lord Mountjoy, offered Collins a full pardon for high treason, the favour of the Queen, and promotion to a high position within either the Irish Royal Army or the Protestant Church of Ireland in return for taking the Oath of Supremacy and accepting the subservience of the Church to the State. To Lord Mountjoy's fury, however, theological arguments by Anglican clergy and even visits from Collins' relatives and their pleas with him to conform to Anglicanism and spare them from the shame of having a family member face a traitors death, did nothing to shake the prisoner's resolve.

== Martyrdom and burial ==
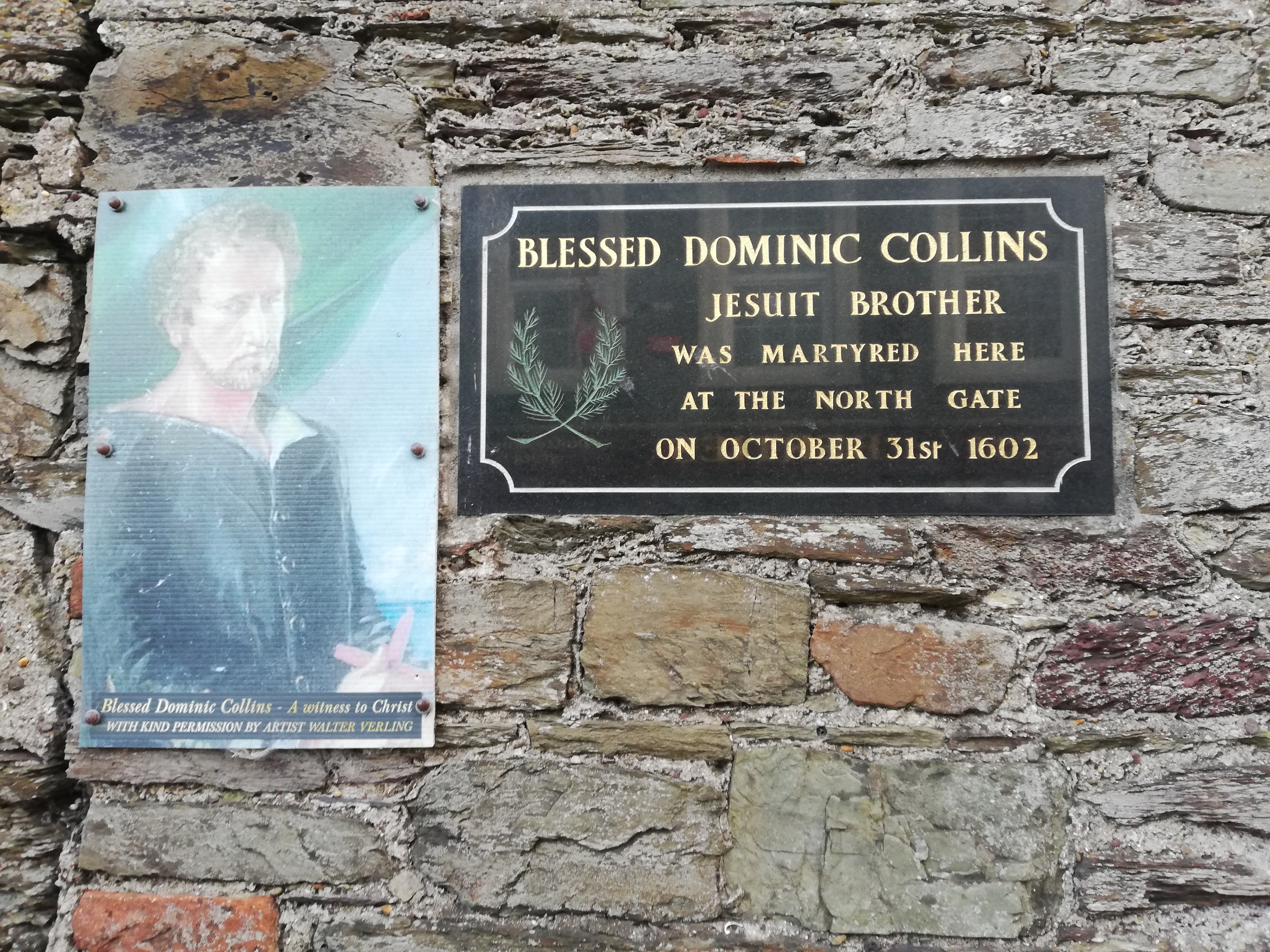
Site of Collins' martyrdom

According to Pacata Hibernia, a detailed account of Sir George Carew's term as President of Munster, which was compiled under his close supervision soon after the events it describes and published posthumously in 1633, "the Fryer, in whom no penitence appeared for his detestable treasons, nor yet would endeavour to merit his life, either by discovering the Rebells' intention, (which was in his power) or by doing some service that might deserve favour, was hanged at Youghall, the Towne wherein he was born."

The accounts by Bishop David Rothe and John Mullin confirm that, after being tried and condemned to death by military tribunal, Dominic Collins was publicly hanged at Youghal on 31 October 1602.

According to D. P. Conyngham, "At dawn, they led him out to execution, with his hands tied behind his back and a halter around his neck. He walked calmly along, with his eyes raised to heaven and his mind fixed on God, reflecting on Christ bearing his Cross. When he arrived at the foot of the gallows, he fell on his knees and kissed it, commending his passage to God; then, following the example of the martyrs, he prayed for his enemies, for the Queen, and for his country, and with alacrity and a cheerful countenance ascended the ladder."

According to Conyngham, "Turning round on the topmost step, from thence, as from a pulpit", Collins addressed the crowd in Spanish, Irish and English. He urged local Catholics, "to preserve the Faith undaunted unto death, and disregard alike the threats and promises of the heretics."

So moved was the crowd that the hangman fled and a passing fisherman was forced to do carry out the execution. Collins's last words before being turned off of the ladder and hanged were, "Look up to heaven and, worthy descendants of your ancestors, who ever constantly professed it, hold fast to the faith for which I am this day to die!"

According to D. P. Conyngham, Dominic Collins was secretly buried two days later by local Catholics inside a nearby chapel and under the cover of night. He was the last of the Irish Catholic Martyrs to die for his faith during the reign of Queen Elizabeth I.

== Legacy ==
According to historian David Murphy, "It was clear from Collins's attitude and final words that he was convinced that he was being persecuted for his religious beliefs. Carew's account of Collins's statements under interrogation support this and this fact became crucial in his cause for beatification. The Society of Jesus immediately accepted that he had been martyred, and his status as a martyr was soon generally accepted by Catholics across Europe. Some miracles were later attributed to him."

Following the reversal of the Suppression of the Society of Jesus in 1814 and Catholic Emancipation in the British Isles in 1829, an early 17th-century portrait of Collins was brought from the Irish College at Salamanca to St Patrick's College at Maynooth, where it still remains.

== Beatification ==
Collins was beatified – along with other Irish Catholic Martyrs – on 27 September 1992 by Pope John-Paul II.

Liturgically his feast is celebrated on 20 June, or 30 October (in the Society of Jesus). Today a Jesuit residence in Dublin is named after him.

== Folklore ==
- According to historian and folklorist Tony Nugent, James Archer and Dominic Collins are associated in local Irish folklore with a rock located in a mountain pass between Kenmare, County Kerry and Bantry, County Cork. The rock, which is known in Munster Irish as Léim an tSagairt ("The Priest's Leap"), is alleged to be where Archer, Collins, or in some accounts both, leapt an enormous distance on horseback to escape pursuit by a posse of Elizabethan soldiers. A metal cross now marks the site.

== Bibliography ==
- Finegan, F.: "The Beatified Martyrs of Ireland," in Irish Theological Quarterly, vol. 65, 2000, 157–167.
- Forristal, D.: Dominic Collins: Irish martyr, Jesuit brother, Dublin, 1992.
