= Dursey massacre =

Massacre in Ireland in 1602

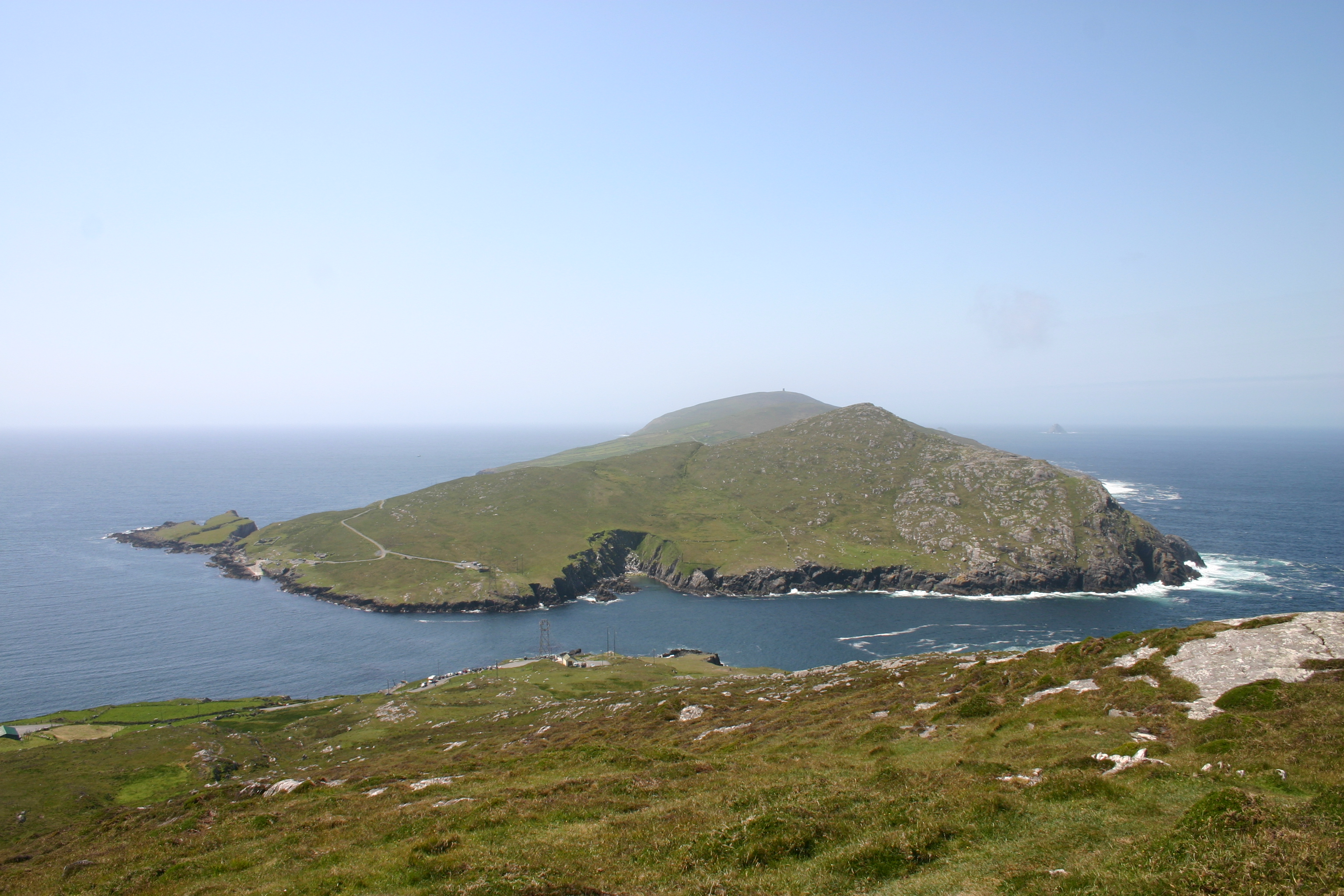
Dursey Island

The Dursey massacre, also called the Dursey Island massacre, took place in June 1602 during the Nine Years' War on Dursey Island off the Beara Peninsula in southern Ireland. According to Philip O'Sullivan Beare, a group of around three hundred Gaelic Irish, including civilians, were killed by an English force under the command of George Carew.

== Background ==
During the Nine Years' War, a coalition of Irish lords led by Hugh O'Neill revolted against English rule in Ireland. In the southern province of Munster, one of these lords was Donal Cam O'Sullivan Beare who was based in the Beara Peninsula in modern County Cork.

After the siege of Kinsale in 1601, O'Sullivan remained one of the few Irish leaders in the region who continued to resist the English Crown. In early 1602, with English forces tightening their control of Munster, O'Sullivan went north to Ulster to consult with O'Neill. In June, an English force attacked Dunboy Castle, one of the more prominent forts in O'Sullivan territory. While O'Sullivan had returned south from Ulster, he was not present at the siege. While the main English force besieged Dunboy Castle, a detachment under George Carew attacked a small fort on the island of Dursey about 20 km away. This fort reportedly housed a group of Irish civilians taking refuge from the fighting in the region.

== Massacre ==
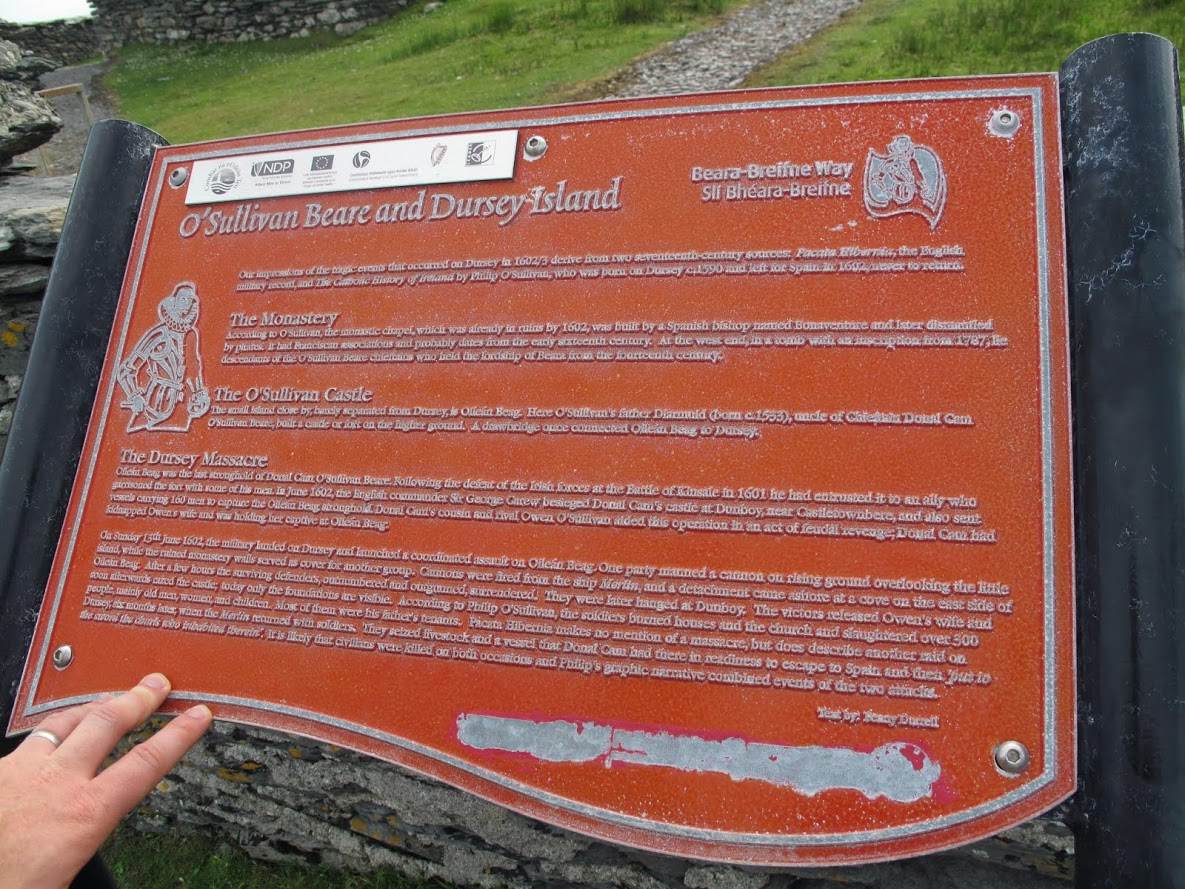
An information sign on Dursey, which questions aspects of Philip O'Sullivan Beare's account

O'Sullivan had hidden a group of civilians, including old men, women and children on the island to protect them from the violence in the area. Approximately 40 Irish soldiers and mercenaries were stationed there to defend the fort.

An English force of several hundred men and some cannons landed on the island in boats. According to varying accounts, the Irish, after initial skirmishes, accepted surrender, with the promise of their lives, when it was offered by Carew. According to a later account written by the nephew of Dónal Cam, Philip O'Sullivan Beare, Carew reneged on the terms of surrender and led his men in killing scores of the survivors. According to Beare's account (who was a child at the time and had been sent to Spain prior to the siege), some of those killed were bound and thrown from nearby cliffs onto the rocks below. The entire group of over three hundred people were killed in the massacre.

== Aftermath ==
Meanwhile, at nearby Dunboy, the outnumbered defenders were overrun and Dunboy Castle fell. The entire garrison, consisting of 143 soldiers, were killed, with 85 dying in the assault and 58 being executed afterwards.

After the fall of Dunboy, O'Sullivan retreated north to West Breifne in modern County Leitrim. This long journey is commonly known as "O'Sullivan's March". On the march, hundreds died from attacks and exposure, while more settled along the way. In the end, of the 1,000 people who left the Beara Peninsula, just 35 remained.

Upon arrival in the north, O'Sullivan put together a force to continue the fight, but the Irish alliance surrendered in March 1603, following O'Neill's surrender and the subsequent Treaty of Mellifont.

== See also ==
- List of massacres in Ireland
