= Donore Castle =

Tower house in County Meath, Ireland

- Caiseal Dhún Uabhair (Irish)
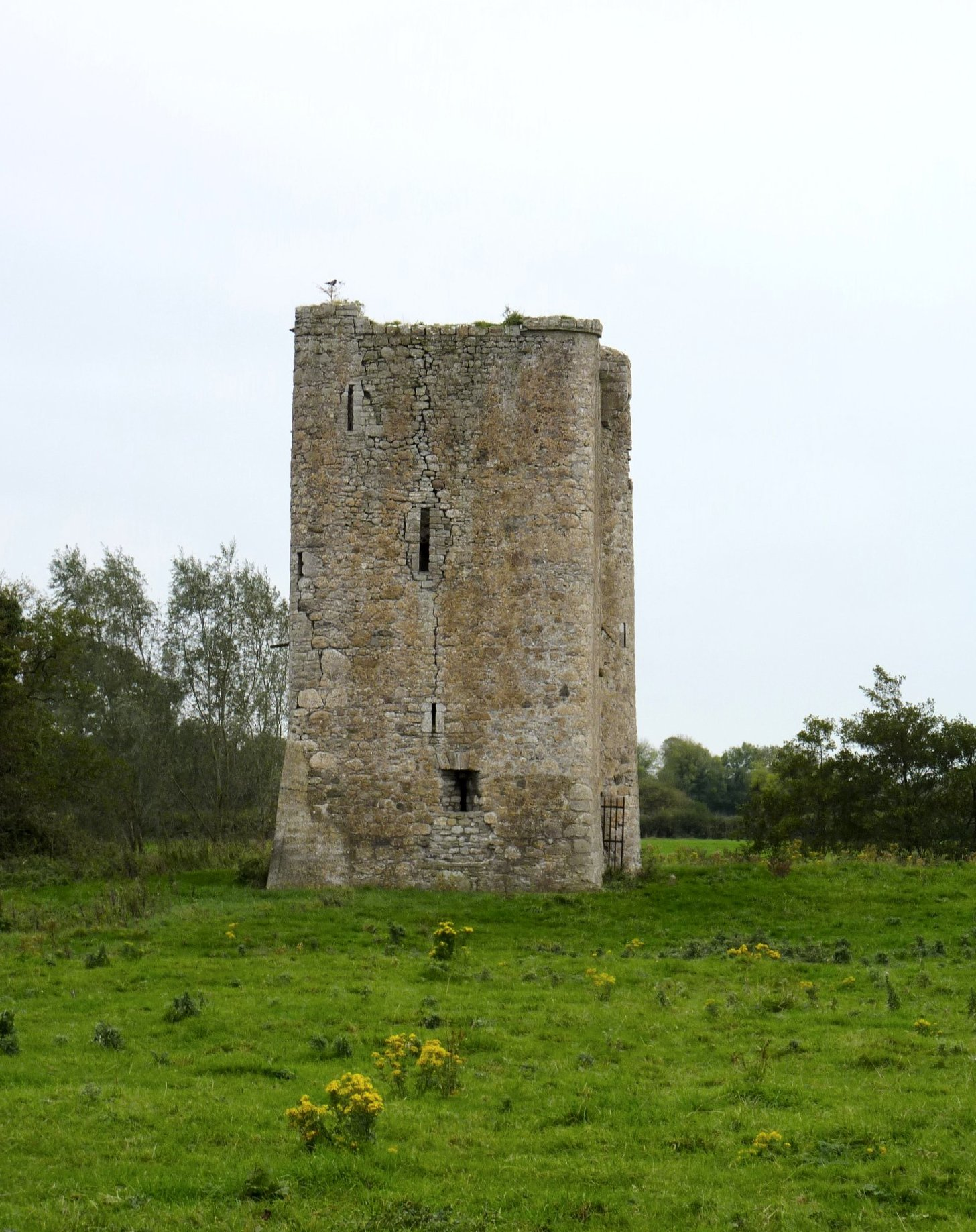

- Location within Ireland
- 53.493406°N 6.942018°W
- Type: tower house
- Location: Donore, Ballivor, County Meath, Ireland

History
- Built: 1430s

Site notes
- Height: 12 m (39 ft)
- Area: Boyne Valley

National monument of Ireland
- Official name: Donore Castle
- Reference no.: 232

Donore Castle is a tower house (caiseal) and National Monument in County Meath, Ireland.

== Location ==
Donore Castle is located on the north bank of the Boyne, south of the R161, just upriver of the point where it meets the Enfield Blackwater.

== History ==
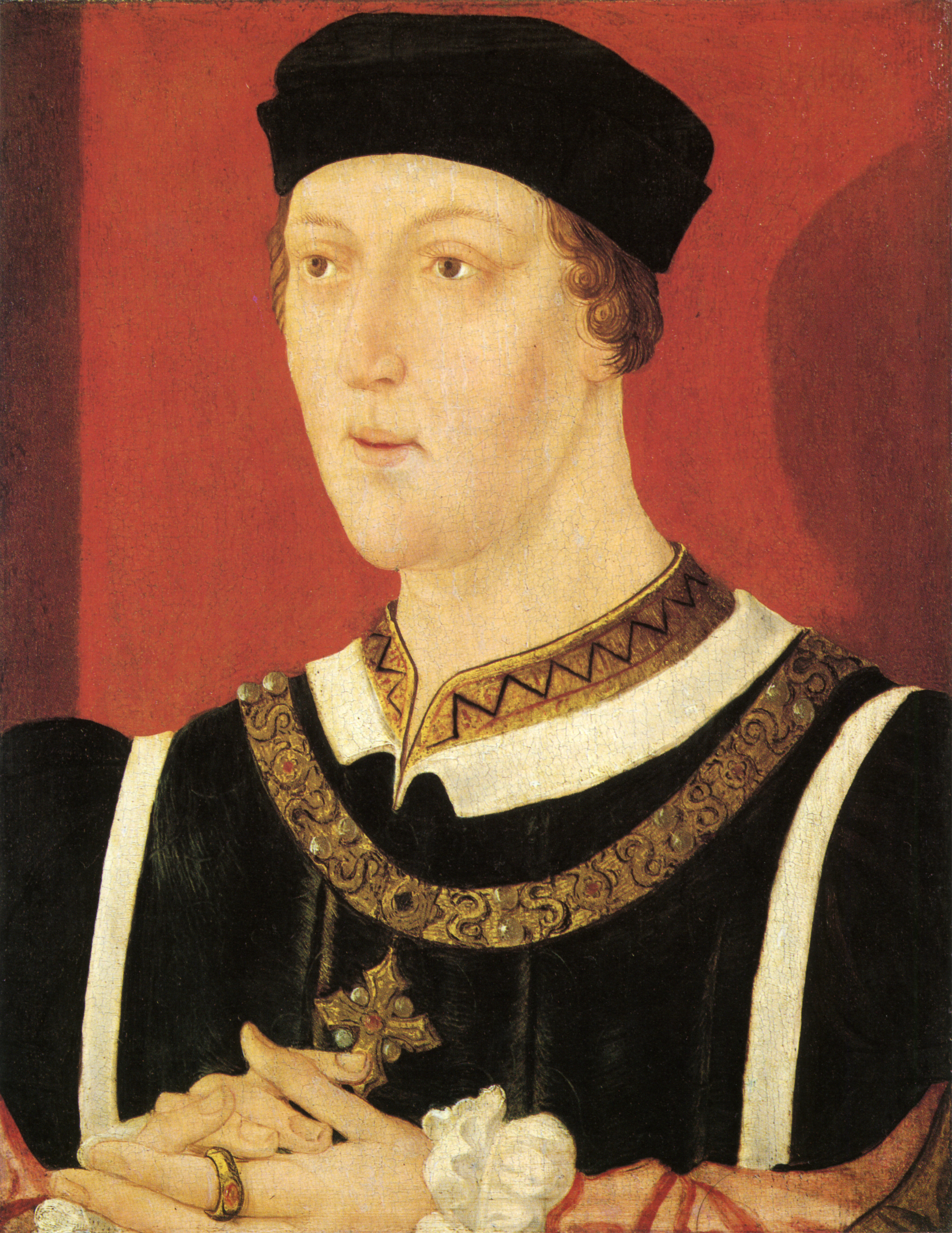
Henry VI, who financed the construction of the "ten-pound castles".

In 1429 Henry VI, King of England and Lord of Ireland in an effort to defend The Pale, granted ten pounds to any of his subjects who built a small defensive tower (20 × 16 × 40 feet) on the edge of the Pale before 1439. The tower house at Donore is assumed to be one of these castles, built by the local power, the Mac Eochagáin (McGeoghegans). In 1650, during the Cromwellian conquest of Ireland, the castle was taken by forces under Sir John Reynolds and over 40 members of the McGeoghegan family were massacred.

According to the Civil Survey (1654–56) Garrat Lench of "Donowre" owned 220 acres (89 ha) in 1640, and on the property was ‘a Castle and Orchard, a weare and some cottages.’ An illustration from 1785 shows the castle occupied with a hip roof (where all sides slope downwards to the walls).

== Building ==
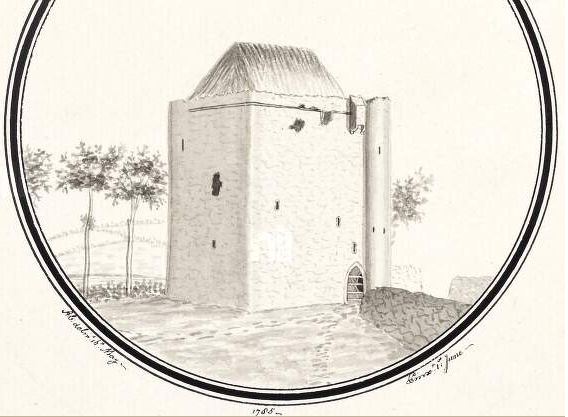
Illustration of 1785 with thatched roof.

The castle has three storeys, and measures 7.3 × 6.3 m at the base, and is 12 m (39 ft) tall with rounded corners a projecting round tower at the corner housing a spiral staircase. It has a vaulted roof on the lower floor and mural garderobe and a fireplace on the upper floors. The ceilings were supported on corbels. One of the Castle's defenses is a murder hole situated at roof level above the entrance door. There are also carved heads of a king and bishop above the doorway.
