= Siege of Dunboy =

Siege in Ireland during the Nine Years' War (1602)

- Part of the Nine Years' War
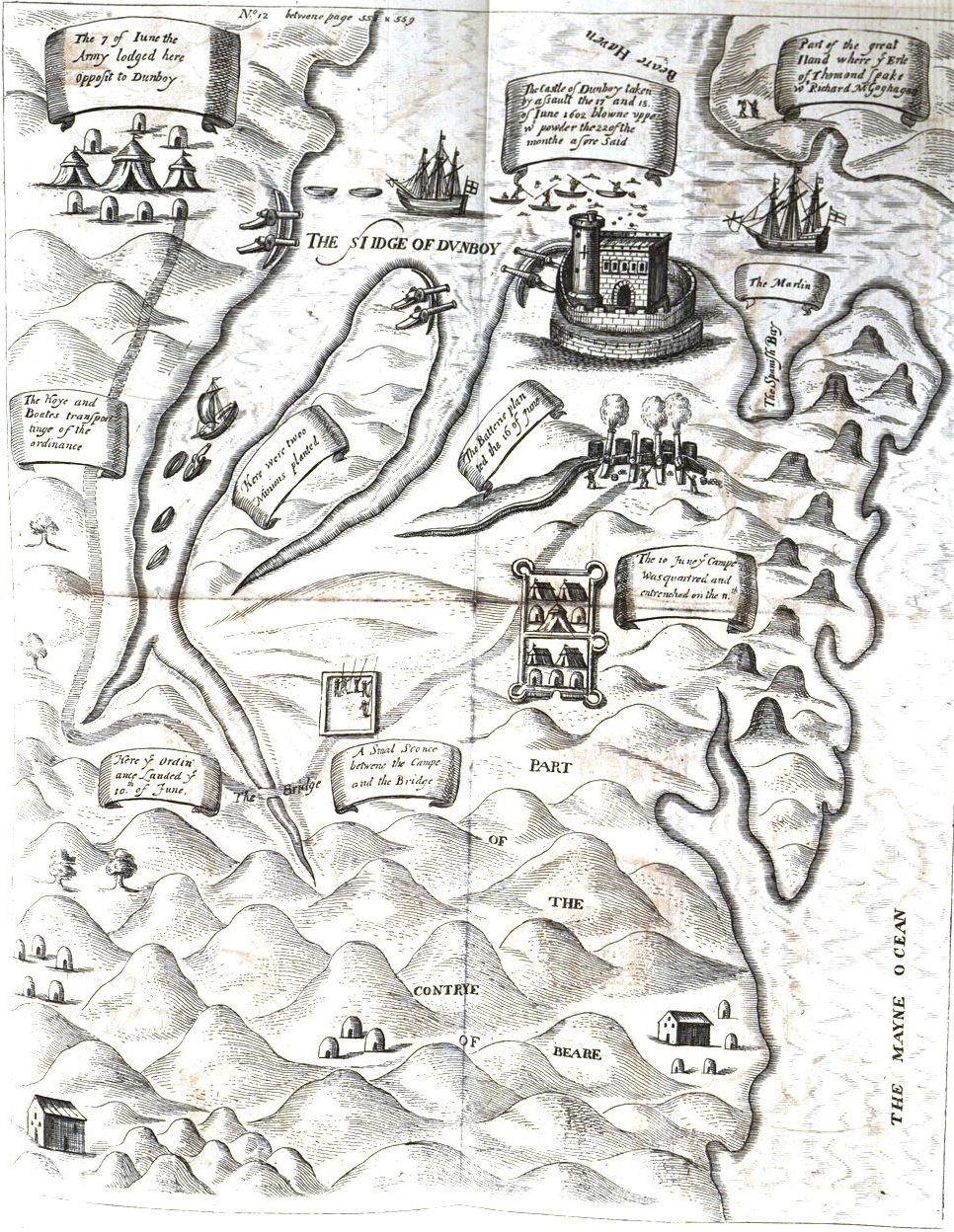
- Annotated map of the siege from Pacata Hibernia
Date	5–18 June 1602 (1 week and 6 days)
Location	Dunboy Castle, Beara Peninsula, Ireland
Result	English/Loyalist victory

Belligerents
England: Irish loyalists	Gaelic Irish alliance

Commanders and leaders
Sir George Carew	Richard MacGeoghegan

Strength
4,000–5,000	143 in castle, more nearby

The siege of Dunboy took place at Dunboy Castle between 5 June and 18 June 1602, during the Nine Years' War in Ireland. It was one of the last battles of the war. An English army of up to 5,000 under Sir George Carew besieged the castle, which was held by a Gaelic Irish force of 143 loyal to Donal Cam O'Sullivan Beare. The English took the castle after eleven days and hanged the majority of captured prisoners. The English also captured a fort on nearby Dursey Island.

== Background ==
Dunboy Castle is near the town of Castletownbere, on the Beara Peninsula in south-western Ireland. It was a stone tower house, built to control and defend the harbour of Bearhaven, which was a stronghold of Donal Cam O'Sullivan Beare, a Gaelic leader and the 'Chief of Dunboy'.

O'Sullivan was part of an alliance of Gaelic leaders who had taken up arms against the English government in Ireland. He was helped by King Philip III of Spain, who sent an invasion force to Kinsale under the command of Don Juan del Águila. After Águila had surrendered to the English Lord Deputy, Lord Mountjoy, in January 1602, O'Sullivan resolved to continue the fight and rallied his forces at Dunboy.

O'Sullivan first had to recover his castle, which was garrisoned by a small force of Spanish troops under the command of a Captain Saavedra. In February, as part of the terms of Águila's surrender to Mountjoy, Saavedra was preparing to hand the castle over to English forces when he and his men were overpowered and disarmed by O'Sullivans (who later released them for transportation back to Spain). O'Sullivan kept all of their arms, ordnance, and munitions, and immediately strengthened the castle in readiness for the inevitable assault. He left a force of 143 of his best men to defend the castle under the charge of Captain Richard MacGeoghegan and care of Friar Dominic Collins.

The English sent an army of between 4000 and 5000, under the command of Sir George Carew Lord President of Munster, to capture the castle. Carew also had the support of the Tudor navy. But before the siege got under way, O'Sullivan himself and most of his army had already marched to another of his strongholds, Ardea Castle, on the northern coast of the Beara peninsula, to secure money and supplies that had just arrived by ship from Spain.

== The siege ==
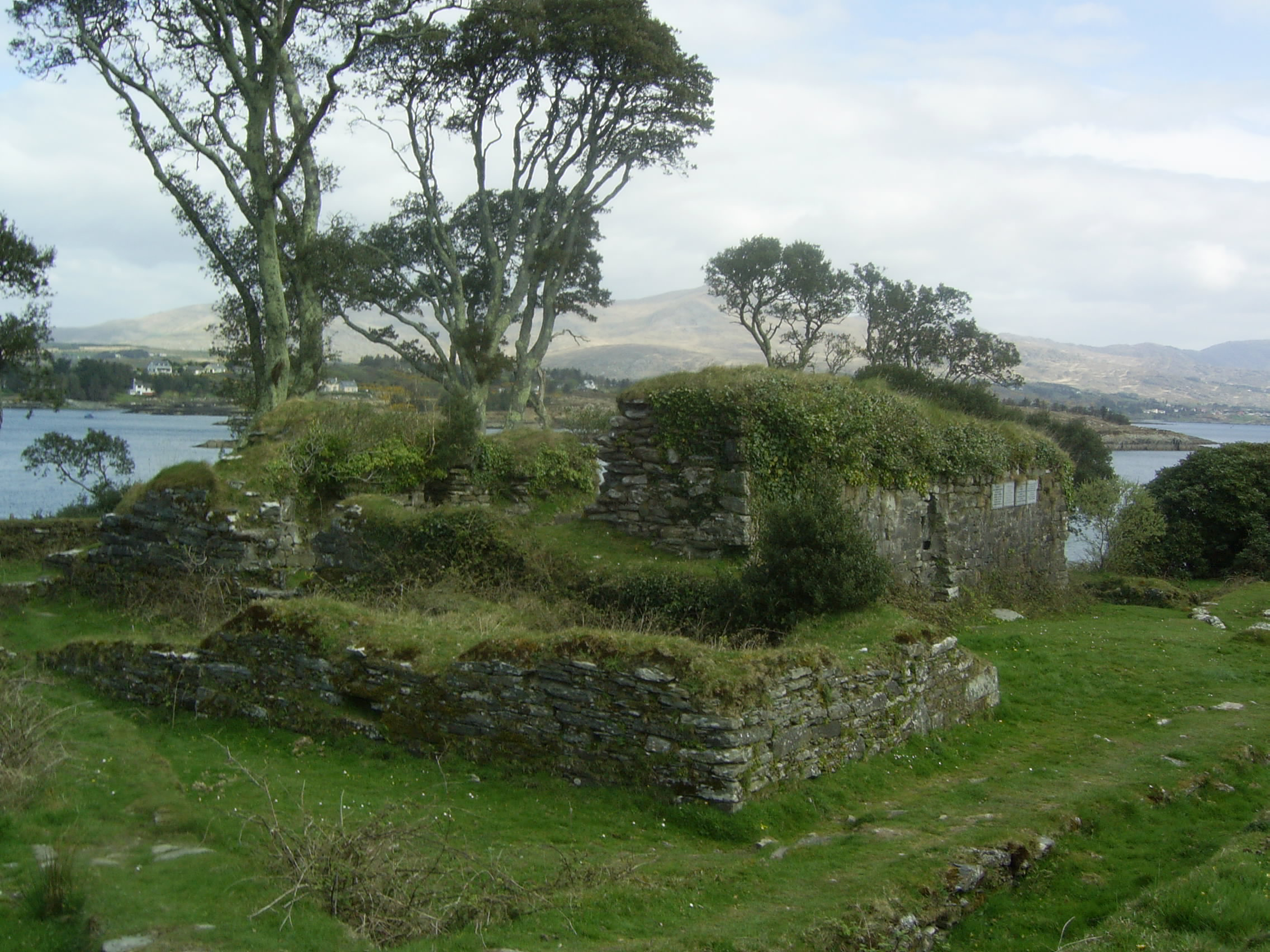
Ruins of Dunboy

Carew began the siege with an artillery bombardment by land and sea. One of O'Sullivan's cousins who had allied himself with Carew, Owen O'Sullivan of Carrignass, told the English commander of a weak point in the castle's walls at a stairwell. The guns were directed to that point, and the walls were eventually breached. By the tenth day the castle had been reduced to ruins.

Richard MacGeoghegan, whose son Bryan had been killed, sent a messenger to Carew requesting terms. Under the rules of war, however, unconditional surrender was required once the battle began. Carew answered by hanging the messenger in sight of the defenders. Certain of their fate should they remain, some of the defenders swam to nearby Bere Island, where they were killed or captured in the water. The remaining defenders repelled another assault and shut themselves in the cellar of the castle as the siege continued.

On the eleventh day, the castle's cellar was finally overrun amid vicious hand-to-hand fighting. MacGeoghegan was hacked by Captain Power as he attempted to ignite the gunpowder stores and blow up the cellar. All but three of those captured during the final assault were hanged in the market square in nearby Castletown Berehaven: of the remaining captives, two were hanged for failing to give information, while Friar Dominic Collins was interrogated by Carew, who demanded he take the oath of supremacy before execution. Collins refused and was taken to his home town of Youghal and hanged.

During the siege of Dunboy, an English detachment under Carew's command also besieged a fort held by the O'Sullivans on nearby Dursey Island. According to Philip O'Sullivan Beare, all 300 of the fort's occupants, including women and children who were sheltering there, were killed by Carew's men under his orders in what became known as the Dursey Island massacre.

== Aftermath ==
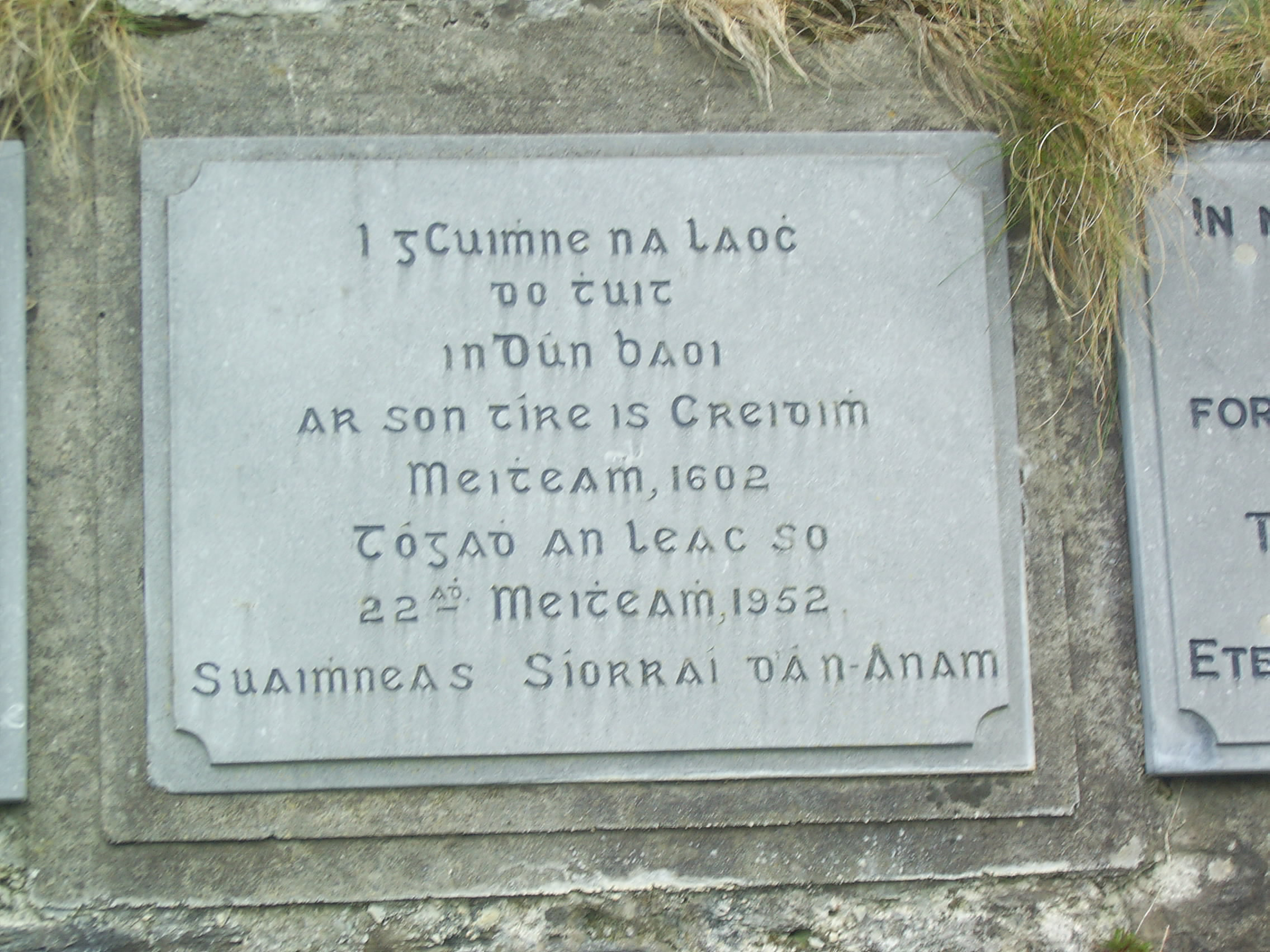
A memorial at the site

After Dunboy fell, O'Sullivan went on a campaign of guerrilla warfare in the region, taking at least six castles. Faced with overwhelming odds and starvation, he set out on a tough march to join his allies in the north of Ireland, with 1000 men, women, and children in his train ("O'Sullivan's March").

O'Sullivan's train was involved in a number of conflicts throughout the long journey. On their arrival at the refuge of O'Rourke's castle in West Breifne, only 35 remained, many having died in battles or from exposure and hunger. Others had settled along the route, where their descendants are known to this date as 'the Beres'.

In West Breifne, O'Sullivan sought to join with other northern chiefs to fight the English and organised a force to this end, but resistance ended when Hugh O'Neill, Earl of Tyrone, successfully sued for peace and swore an oath of loyalty to the English crown. O'Sullivan declined this option and sought exile in Spain, where he was later murdered.
