= Dunboy Castle =

Ruined castle in County Cork, Ireland

Coordinates: 51.633°N 9.924°W

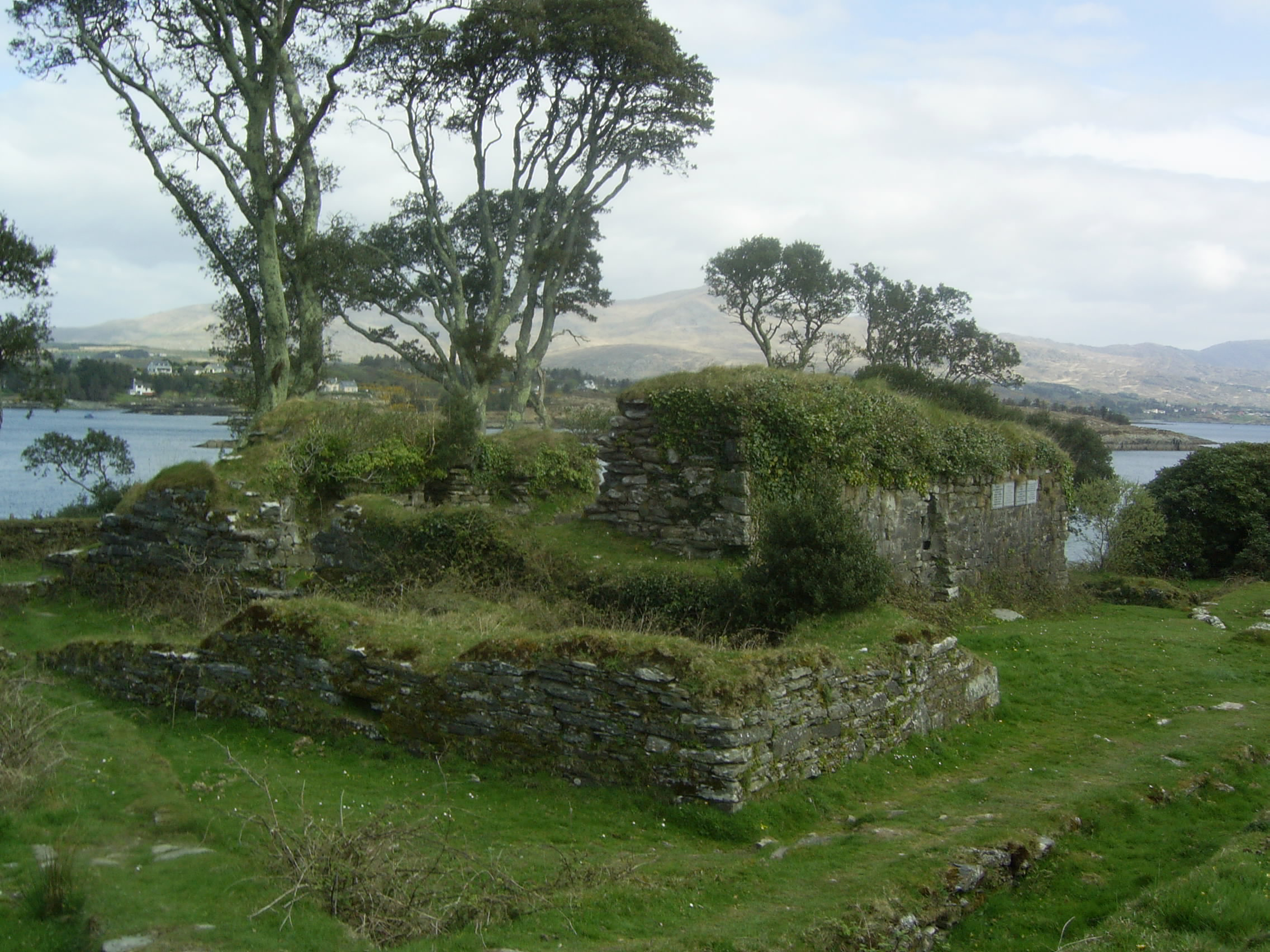
Remains of Dunboy castle

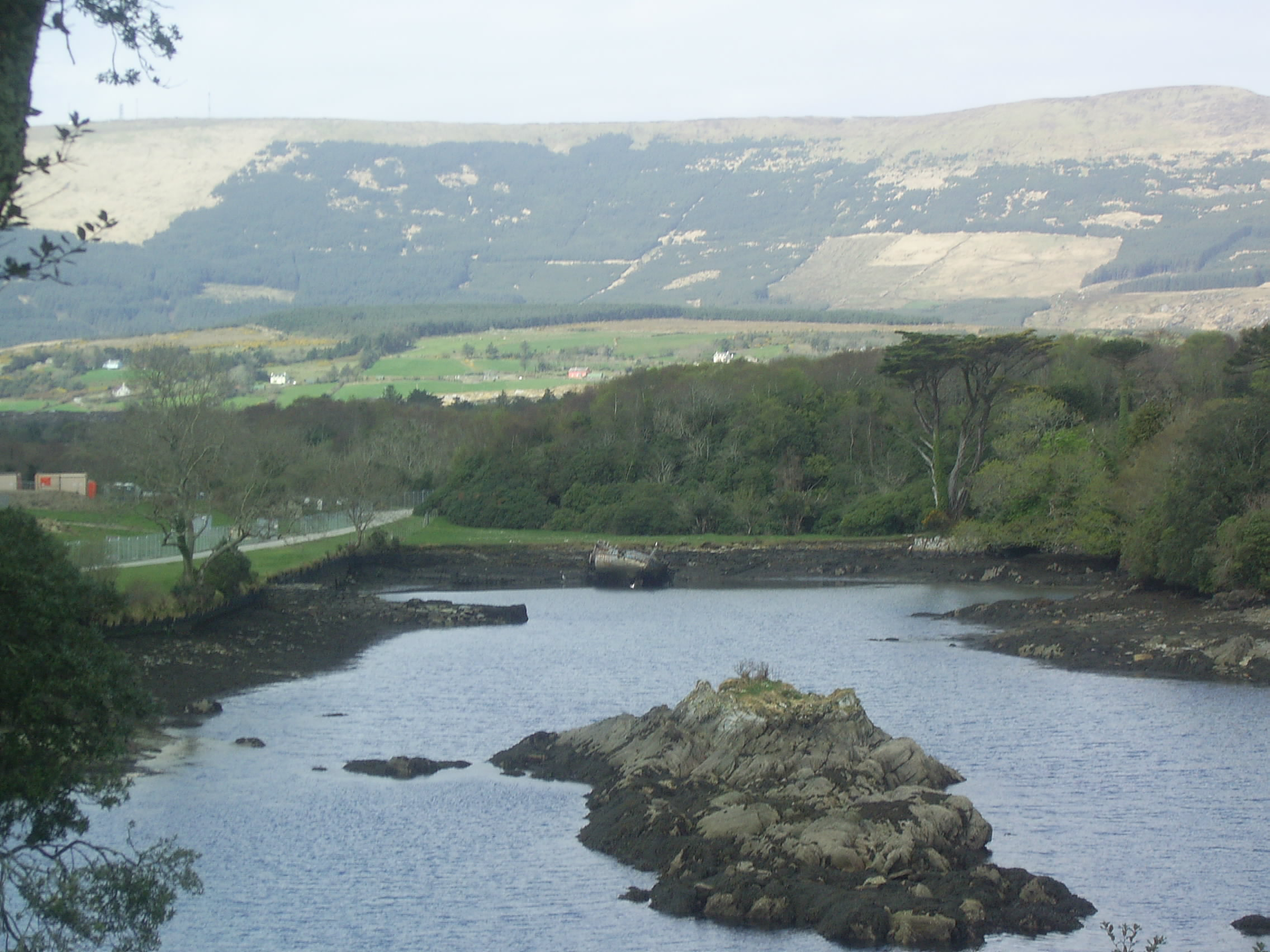
View inland from Dunboy castle

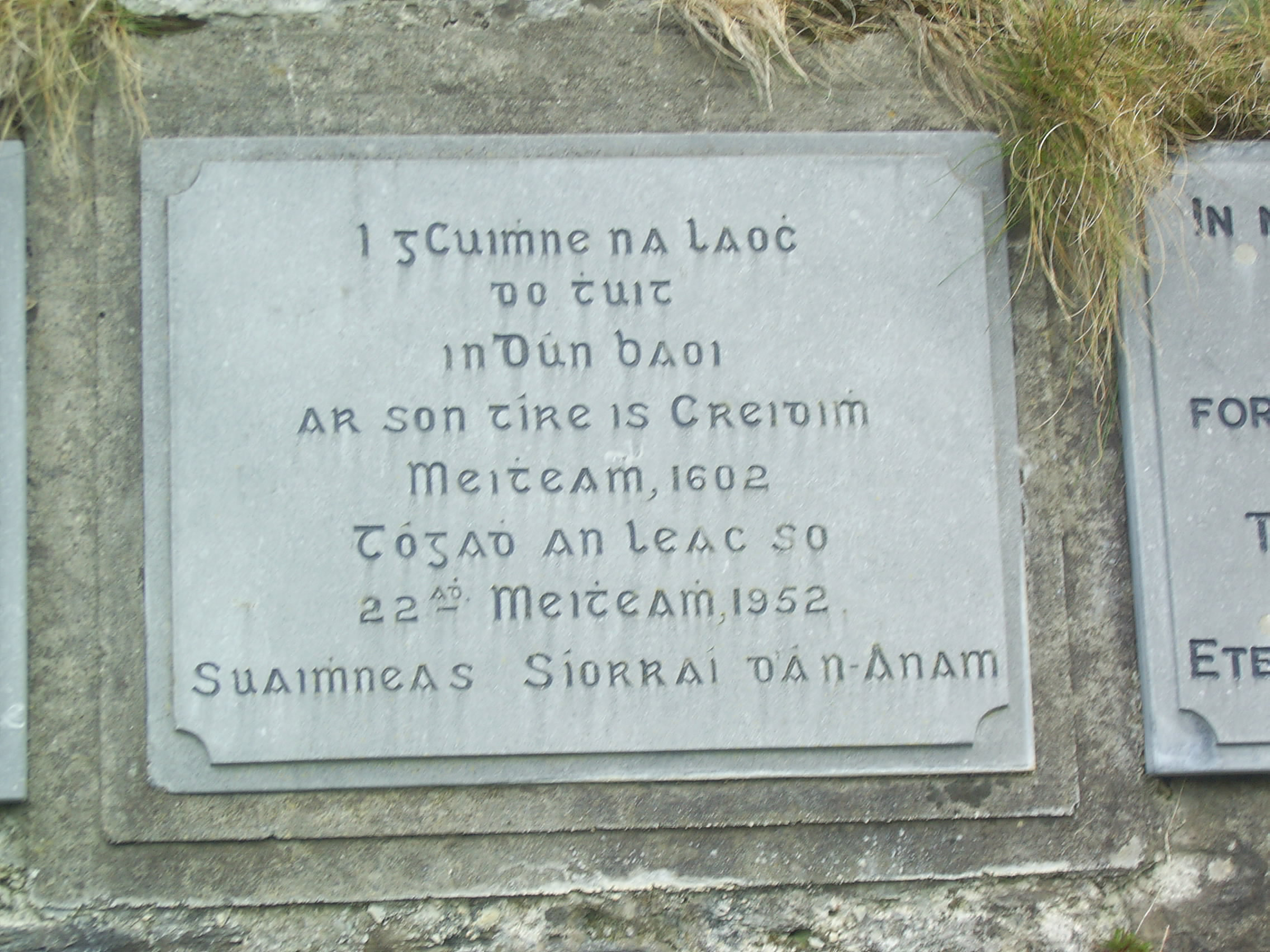
Plaque on castle wall. Translation from Irish: 'In memory of the heroes who fell in Dunboy on behalf of country and faith in June 1602. May their souls rest in peace.'

Dunboy Castle (Irish: Caisleán Dhún Baoi) is a ruined 15th-century castle on the Beara Peninsula in south-west Ireland near the town of Castletownbere. The castle's tower house and bawn were destroyed in the 1602 Siege of Dunboy, though its ruins remain open to the public.

A later manor house, historically known as Puxley Mansion but sometimes also referred to as Dunboy Castle, was built close to the castle ruins during the 19th century.

== History ==
Originally a stronghold of the O'Sullivan Bere clan, Dunboy Castle was built in the 15th century to guard and defend the harbour of Berehaven. Its presence enabled the O'Sullivan Bere family, including Donal Cam O'Sullivan Beare a Gaelic clan leader and 'Chief of Dunboy', to control the sea fisheries off the Irish coast and collect taxes from Irish and continental European fishing vessels sheltering in the haven. It was also a centre for the import/export trade to and from the continent.

In the summer of 1602, during the Nine Years' War, Dunboy Castle was the scene of the noted Siege of Dunboy which ultimately led to the castle's destruction and the breaking of the power of the O'Sullivan Bere. At that time, Donal Cam O'Sullivan Beare was in rebellion against the English crown, and Elizabeth I had sent a 5000-strong army under the command of Sir George Carew to suppress the insurgents. Even with its small garrison of 143 men, Dunboy Castle was thought to be impregnable but following a fierce artillery bombardment the walls were smashed and after some desperate hand-to-hand fighting amid the rubble the defenders were finally overcome. The 58 survivors of the two-week siege were executed in the nearby market square.

The remains of the castle were left to ruin, until the mid-17th century when a bastion fort was built on the site. Both the 15th-century castle and 17th-century fort were surveyed by arachnologist Edward M. Fahy in the late 1960s.

== Manor house ==
Near the castle ruins stands Puxley Mansion, also known as Puxley Castle, a 19th-century manor house. It was burnt by the IRA in 1920 in reprisal for the destruction of houses that harboured IRA men and weapons by the Crown Forces. While some restoration work was completed in the 2000s, funding issues halted plans to refurbish the mansion and open it as a hotel. Also sometimes known as Dunboy Castle, the refurbished manor house was reportedly sold in March 2022.

== See also ==
- List of castles in Ireland
- List of coastal fortifications of County Cork
