= Gary Smyth (loyalist) =

North Irish loyalist (1963/64–2024)

- Born: 1963 or 1964; Belfast, Northern Ireland
- Died: 10 November 2024 (aged 60); East Dunbartonshire, Scotland
- Other names: "Smickers" "Chiefo"
- Occupation: Pet shop owner
- Organization: Ulster Defence Association
- Known for: Loyalist paramilitary
- Title: Commander of C Company
- Term: -2002
- Successor: Alan McCullough

Gary Smyth (sometimes written as Gary Smith or Garry Smyth; 1963 or 1964 – 10 November 2024) was a Northern Irish loyalist paramilitary. Smyth was an active member of the West Belfast Brigade of the Ulster Defence Association (UDA) during the Troubles. He was known by the nickname "Smickers" throughout his paramilitary career, although he was also sometimes called "Chiefo".

== Early years ==
A native of Belfast's Shankill Road, David Lister and Hugh Jordan state that Smyth joined the UDA for the first time around 1980 but left again in 1981 after a disagreement with his superiors. William "Bucky" McCullough, a leading figure in the West Belfast Brigade, was killed at his Shankill home by the Irish National Liberation Army (INLA) in 1981. In response, Smyth hatched a plan to shoot up a bus stop on the republican Falls Road in retaliation. When the plan was vetoed by Smyth's superiors he left the UDA in disgust at what he perceived to be their inaction.

== C Company ==
At a later unspecified date Smyth, who also ran a pet shop on the Shankill Road, rejoined the UDA as a member of C14, a unit of C Company which was active in the lower Shankill. Smyth's reputation as a ruthless operator brought him to the attention of Johnny Adair, a rising star from C8, and the two became close as Adair rapidly ascended the ranks. In 1990 Smyth was made second in command of C Company and thus deputy to Adair. According to Lister & Jordan Smyth was somewhat older than Adair, being described as "in his thirties" in 1990. However, in 2004 he was described by two separate newspapers as being 38, making him the same age as Adair. In 1990 C Company had come into possession of a rocket-propelled grenade anti-tank weapon and Smyth proved one of the few members of the group to show proficiency with the unusual piece of artillery. As a result, Smyth and fellow C Company member Gary McMaster were chosen on 12 February 1994 to travel to Andersonstown where they fired the weapon at Connolly House, causing extensive damage to the Sinn Féin headquarters.

On 26 October 1993 Smyth was, according to senior UDA sources, one of two gunmen who launched a gun attack on a refuse depot on the nationalist Kennedy Way. Two were killed and five wounded in the attack. He became one of the leading C Company gunmen and was highly prized by Adair, who bought him a car amongst other gifts and took him into HMP Maze in 1994 to show him off to other C Company members who were incarcerated such as "Fat" Jackie Thompson and Sam McCrory. Smyth's high-profile made him a regular target for RUC Special Branch, who hoped that the older man might be persuaded to turn against the younger guns and they paid a number of visits to his pet shop to offer him bribes in return for becoming an agent. Smyth however refused the offers. During this period he was allegedly part of a C Company gang linked to 20 sectarian killings.

Smyth's time as C Company's leading gunman came to an end in 1994 when he was arrested whilst on an assignment. Along with Rab Bradshaw and Richard Calderwood, Smyth had been dispatched to kill republican Brian Gillen and the three met in a safe house provided by South Belfast UDA member Glen Esdale, who joined them on the expedition. However, before they could reach their destination the car was intercepted by police, who had been monitoring their activities throughout, and all four were arrested. At this trial in February 1995 Smyth was sentenced to 16 years imprisonment for conspiracy to commit murder and possession of illegal weapons. By late 1995 there were no fewer than thirteen C Company members, including Adair, in the Maze.

== Return to prominence ==
Smyth would be released from prison long before his sixteen years were up as part of a post-ceasefire prisoner release scheme in 1998. In late 1997 and early 1998 Smyth, along with Stephen "Top Gun" McKeag, was behind a spate of deadly attacks launched by C Company under orders from the imprisoned Adair. The attacks were ordered as retaliation for the killing by the INLA of Loyalist Volunteer Force (LVF) leader Billy Wright in prison. Adair was seeking to build close links with the hard-line LVF and believed a show of retaliatory strength by Smyth and McKeag would help cement these links. Smyth regularly accompanied Adair, McKeag and Winkie Dodds to the LVF heartland of Portadown to socialise with leading members of the organisation. Smyth emerged as the military leader of the West Belfast Brigade which, although officially on ceasefire, had taken to using the cover name "Red Hand Defenders" to carry on killing.

Smyth had a difficult relationship with McKeag, who had come to C Company later than many of those close to Adair, and was somewhat jealous of "Top Gun's" reputation in wider loyalist circles. In 1999 Smyth, Adair and McKeag attended a loyalist event at the Royal Antediluvian Order of Buffaloes on the Corcrain estate in Portadown where McKeag was mobbed by fans from the LVF and on stage was applauded by all except his C Company comrades Adair and Smyth. Smyth continued the resentment a few months later when, as McKeag received a "Volunteer of the Year" prize at the annual ceremony held at the Diamond Jubilee bar on the Shankill Road, he yelled "what about me" from the audience. With Adair in prison and Smyth in temporary command of C Company, McKeag fell out of favour and was soon ordered off the Shankill, ostensibly for becoming involved in fights between women at illegal UDA-run drinking dens on the Shankill.

On 19 August 2000 Adair organised a "loyalist day of culture" on the lower Shankill, inviting the five other UDA brigadiers – Jim Gray (East Belfast), John Gregg (South East Antrim), Jackie McDonald (South Belfast), Billy McFarland (Londonderry and North Antrim) and Jimbo Simpson (North Belfast) – Ulster Democratic Party politicians John White and Frank McCoubrey and Michael Stone to a festival of loyalist marching bands and a show of strength by the West Belfast Brigade. Around 3 p.m. that day the UDA's marching band passed the Rex Bar, a known stronghold of the Ulster Volunteer Force (UVF) on the mid Shankill, where they unfurled the banner of the Loyalist Volunteer Force (LVF), a UVF splinter group that Adair was close to. The LVF man and his supporters were attacked by UVF members although after a brief fight word went down the Shankill and C Company, at the time being led by Smyth, ran up the road to attack the UVF. Although they had by then barricaded themselves inside the Rex Bar a number of UVF members were injured in the attack which Smyth had led from the lower Shankill with the call to arms "C Company, fall in – up that road, now!". Smyth and Mo Courtney soon linked up with the Shoukri brothers, two emerging figures in the North Belfast UDA who backed Adair in his feud with the UVF and one of whom, Andre, Adair would later help take over from Jimbo Simpson as North Belfast Brigadier.

Smyth was present at the Holy Cross dispute in 2001 when a group of loyalist protesters picketed a Catholic primary school in the loyalist Glenbryn/Upper Ardoyne area close to the republican Ardoyne area. As tension heightened Smyth was arrested and found guilty of making a hoax warning call to the police in which he claimed a car bomb had been left outside the school. Smyth made the call on behalf of the "Red Hand Defenders", a cover name used by dissident loyalists who actually belonged to various groups. The Royal Ulster Constabulary had placed bugs in several phone boxes around Glenbryn in the hope of making such a discovery. At this point Smyth had been recognised as leader of C Company but he forfeited the position when he was sent to HMP Maghaberry by then Secretary of State for Northern Ireland John Reid, with command passing to Alan McCullough.

== Post-UDA activity ==
Smith married Eileen in 1984, and together they went on to have two children.

Smyth left Bolton in 2004 after the gang fell apart and instead he, his girlfriend Sharon and their child moved to Scotland, where Sam McCrory already had close links to local loyalists. Smyth's departure from England had been hastened by a falling out he had with Thompson and his brother-in-law James "Sham" Millar. He briefly returned to Belfast in December 2004 to attend the funeral of his brother Stanley although he was guarded by a heavy police presence throughout his brief stay in the city. In 2009 he was reported by the Daily Record as living in Kilmarnock in a property owned by his friend and convicted tobacco smuggler Tommy Burns.

In 2007 the Sunday Life tabloid reported that former supporters of Smyth were behind the formation of the Real Ulster Freedom Fighters, although it was not claimed that Smyth himself was involved in the group.

In August 2023, Smyth was sentenced to 3 years supervision and placed on the Sex Offenders Register after pleading guilty at Kilmarnock Sheriff Court to sexually communicating with a 12-year-old boy.

== Death ==
Smyth later lived in exile in Kirkintilloch, East Dunbartonshire, Scotland. He suffered a heart attack at home, and later died in hospital, on 10 November 2024. Smyth was 60.
