= James Millar (loyalist) =

Northern Irish loyalist (born 1966)

- Born: 6 July 1966 (age 60); Belfast, Northern Ireland
- Other names: "Sham" "Boss Hog"; Jim
- Organization: Ulster Defence Association
- Known for: Loyalist paramilitary
- Parent: Wendy Millar
- Relatives: Herbie Millar (brother); Jackie Thompson (brother-in-law)

James Millar (born 6 July 1966) is a Northern Irish loyalist paramilitary. Millar was a leading member of the West Belfast Brigade of the Ulster Defence Association (UDA) until 2003 when he was one of a number of dissident members forcibly expelled from the group.

== Early years ==
Sham Millar was born in Belfast to a Protestant family and made his home in the Shankill Road area of west Belfast. He is the son of Wendy Millar, who was a leading figure in the UDA's women's unit. Along with contemporaries such as his brother Herbie, Johnny Adair, Sam McCrory, "Fat" Jackie Thompson and Donald Hodgen, Millar was part of a skinhead gang that was involved in petty and violent crime in and around the lower Shankill in the early 1980s.

== Joining the UDA ==
The skinhead gang as a whole were sworn into the UDA in 1984 and assigned to C8 the eighth active unit of C Company, the section of the West Belfast Brigade that was active in the lower Shankill. Millar, Adair, Thompson and McCrory initially formed an active unit that drove around neighbouring republican areas looking for and occasionally attacking targets, notably Sinn Féin councillor Sean Keenan, whom the group injured in a shooting at his Andersonstown home in June 1990. Like Thompson, Millar was heavy set, although at 16 stone he weighed six stone less than his friend. Bearing a number of tattoos like his fellow C Company members, Millar's most notorious tattoo was the legend "Fuck Taigs" across the back of his neck.

According to David Lister and Hugh Jordan Millar committed his first murder on 31 July 1990 when he killed Catholic civilian John Judge at his home on the Falls Road. With McCrory driving, Millar, Thompson and a third unidentified gunman crossed the peace line before shooting Judge, with Millar firing the fatal shots after Thompson had initially wounded the victim. The attack occurred as Judge was talking with a number of friends outside his house, where his son's fifth birthday party was taking place. The attack was claimed by the UDA under its "Ulster Freedom Fighters" codename two days later. The statement claimed that the attack was in revenge for the murder of Conservative Party MP Ian Gow and added that Judge was a "known IRA bomber", a claim rejected by both Sinn Féin and the Royal Ulster Constabulary (RUC). Millar and Thompson were arrested for Judge's murder although neither was charged in the end. Soon after his release a warrant was put out for Millar's arrest again after Katherine Spruce, a former girlfriend of Adair's who claimed to have been manhandled and forcibly ejected from Adair's flat by members of C Company after the pair had a row, went to the police and volunteered information about the plotting being done by Adair, Millar and others at Adair's flat. Millar went on the run to avoid arrest. The allegations made by Spruce did not stand up however and before long Millar was back on the Shankill in Adair's company.

== Adair as Brigadier ==
Adair became Brigadier in West Belfast in 1993 and, according to RUC Special Branch reports into their activity, the Brigade became much more active in drug dealing after this, with Millar named as one of 26 main dealers active in the area in 1995. According to further RUC files by 1999 Millar, who was recognised as the senior operative in the drug peddling arm, was making as much as £10,000 a week through dealing. Millar's appetite for wealth earned him the second nickname of "Boss Hogg" after the notoriously money-driven character from The Dukes of Hazzard. At this time Millar was living in the "Beirut" area of the lower Shankill, where close neighbours included Adair, Thompson, Hodgen and Winkie Dodds and from where C Company operated a dedicated drugs flat.

On 19 August 2000 Adair organised a "loyalist day of culture" on the lower Shankill, inviting the five other UDA brigadiers – Jim Gray (East Belfast), John Gregg (South East Antrim), Jackie McDonald (South Belfast), Billy McFarland (Londonderry and North Antrim) and Jimbo Simpson (North Belfast) – Ulster Democratic Party politicians John White and Frank McCoubrey and Michael Stone to a festival of loyalist marching bands and a show of strength by the West Belfast Brigade. Around 3 pm that day the UDA's marching band passed the Rex Bar, a known stronghold of the Ulster Volunteer Force (UVF) on the mid Shankill, where they unfurled the banner of the Loyalist Volunteer Force (LVF), a UVF splinter group that Adair was close to. The LVF man and his supporters were attacked by UVF members although after a brief fight word went down the Shankill and C Company, at the time being led by Gary "Smickers" Smith, ran up the road to attack the UVF. Although they had by then barricaded themselves inside the Rex Bar a number of UVF members were injured in the attack with Millar filmed by TV cameras that were there to cover the day of culture being shown beating a UVF member about the head four times with an iron bar.

Adair began to feud with the rest of the UDA in 2002 and on 20 September of that year Adair was summoned to a meeting of the Inner Council, the name given to the six brigadiers, in Belfast's Sandy Row. Millar was, along with Thompson, chosen by Adair to accompany him to this showdown and the pair smuggled a gun in for Adair in case the meeting was to be an ambush (which it was not). Adair was expelled from the UDA soon afterwards but stated "fuck them 'uns" and declared the West Belfast Brigade to be a separate entity. Millar and his brother were amongst a small group of C Company members who remained loyal to Adair up to the end.

== Expulsion ==
The end for Adair came on 5 February 2003 when a fleet of around 100 members of the mainstream UDA descended on the lower Shankill to run Adair's supporters out and bring the West Belfast Brigade back into the fold. Adair himself had been returned to prison following the killing of John Gregg earlier that month. Millar fled the Shankill with Gina Adair, John White and a number of C Company members under a police escort, catching a ferry to Cairnryan. He and Thompson, who was Millar's brother-in-law and with whom Millar had opened a sandwich shop, left immediately before the attack having been tipped off that it was going to happen.

Along with the rest of the group Millar eventually made his way to Bolton where they were housed by friends of Adair in the far right paramilitary group Combat 18. Around this time Millar and Gina Adair, the wife of Johnny Adair, were reported to have rekindled a long-dormant affair, despite Millar's girlfriend Alana Griffiths also being in hiding with him. Millar and Gina Adair were the targets of a machine gun attack on their shared home in 2003. This shooting, which claimed no casualties, was later revealed to be the handiwork of C Company member Alan McCullough, who hoped to use the attack to ingratiate himself with the mainstream UDA. Whilst in exile Millar and Thompson had a falling out with fellow Company member Gary "Smickers" Smyth which resulted in Smyth splitting from the group to relocate to Scotland.

In August 2006, Millar spoke to Belfast Telegraph reporters denying newspaper claims that he and Thompson were helping rogue C Company member Alan McClean find a house in Bolton adding that he had not seen him since quitting Belfast in February 2003. McClean, his family and supporters had been expelled from Belfast after a stand-off at the Westland Estate with the mainstream UDA the week before Millar gave the interview. Millar also maintained he had severed ties with Adair and begun a new life.

I have a very happy life here in Bolton now. I am working, have a house sorted and everything was going well until these lies appeared in the paper. I have closed that chapter in my life now. I don't want anything to do with the UDA wrangling back in Belfast.
