= Wendy Millar =

Northern Irish loyalist (born 1944)

- Born: 1944 (age 81–82); Belfast, Northern Ireland
- Other names: "Bucket" "Queen of the UDA"
- Known for: Ulster Defence Association member and founder of its first women's unit
- Relatives: Herbie Millar (son); James "Sham" Millar (son) "Fat" Jackie Thompson (son-in-law)

Wendy Millar (born 1944) is a Northern Irish loyalist and a founding member of the Ulster Defence Association (UDA). She established the first UDA women's unit on her native Shankill Road in Belfast. Her two sons Herbie and James "Sham" Millar are also high-profile UDA members and her daughter's husband is former West Belfast brigadier "Fat" Jackie Thompson.

== UDA women's unit ==
Born into a Protestant family in Belfast, Northern Ireland, in about 1944, Wendy Millar was raised on the staunchly loyalist Shankill Road. She was one of the founding members of the Ulster Defence Association (UDA) which was set up in September 1971 as an umbrella organisation for the many local vigilante groups that had sprung up in loyalist areas to protect their communities from attacks by Irish republicans following the outbreak of the violent religious-political conflict known as the Troubles in the late 1960s. She had the nicknames of "Bucket" on account of her outspoken, loud-mouthed personality, and "Queen of the UDA" for her devotion to the paramilitary organisation. Described as tough and fearless, she was a heavy smoker and a "leading light in UDA circles".

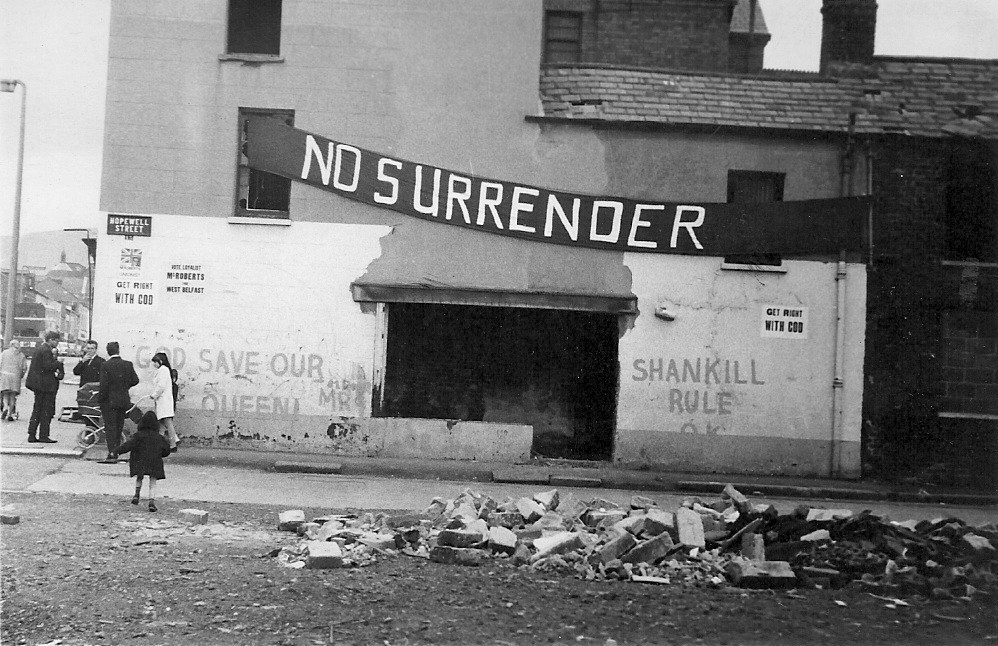
A street off the lower Shankill Road in the early 1970s

Shortly afterwards, Millar established the first UDA women's unit on the Shankill Road. Although there were other women's units set up in other areas, the Shankill Road group was particularly active and highly visible on account of the beehive hairstyles the women typically wore. In May 1974, during the Ulster Workers' Council strike, the general secretary of the Trades Union Congress, Len Murray went to Belfast to lead the striking shipyard workers on a 'back to work' march. Just as the marchers set out for the Harland and Wolff shipyard, furious members of the Shankill Road women's unit arrived on the scene and proceeded to pelt Murray with flour, eggs and other objects. Glen Barr, the chairman of the strike co-ordinating committee witnessed the assault. In an interview with British journalist Peter Taylor he described the UDA women with their beehives as looking "quite frightening" and resembled six feet tall Amazons. Barr had had encounters with the women on previous occasions and was intimidated by them.

Another group, the Sandy Row women's unit, gained notoriety in July 1974 when its commander Elizabeth "Lily" Douglas ordered her "Heavy Squad" (a gang within the unit who meted out punishment beatings) to bring Protestant single mother Ann Ogilby to a "Romper Room" where she was subsequently beaten to death. "Romper Rooms" were locations where UDA victims were brought to be "rompered" which was a UDA slang term for a torture and beating session prior to "execution". The name derived from the children's television programme. The brutality of the attack greatly shocked the Protestant community and the UDA leadership which had not sanctioned the killing. Douglas and ten others were imprisoned for Ann Ogilby's murder and the unit was subsequently stood down. Jean Moore and later Hester Dunn headed the UDA women's department from the UDA headquarters on Gawn Street, in east Belfast. The women's units were typically involved in local community work and responsible for the assembly and delivery of food parcels to UDA prisoners. The latter activity was a source of pride for the UDA.

As the Northern Ireland conflict continued over the years and decades, Millar remained within the UDA to serve as a loyal and dedicated member. Her sons Herbie (born c.1965) and James "Sham" Millar (born c.1966) later became high-profile figures inside the organisation, and her daughter married high-ranking member "Fat" Jackie Thompson.

== Johnny Adair and C Company ==
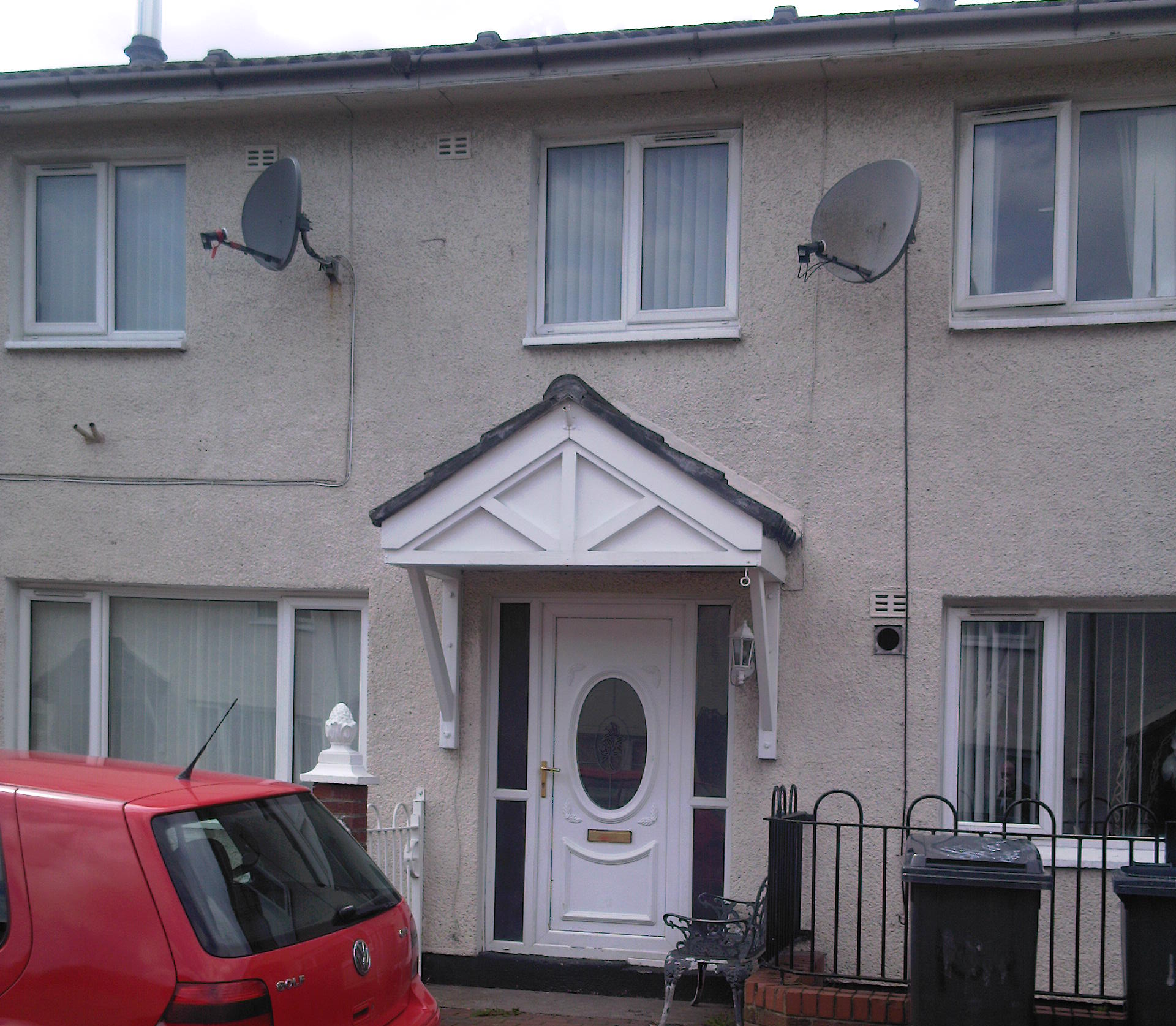
Johnny Adair's house in Boundary Way, during the period when he was West Belfast brigadier

Millar, her sons and son-in-law were part of the UDA West Belfast Brigade's C Company 2nd Battalion based on the Shankill Road which in the early 1990s came under the command of Johnny Adair who was made West Belfast brigadier. On 10 August 1992, the UDA was proscribed by the British government. Up until then it had been a legal organisation. Millar became an ardent supporter of Adair and set herself up as resident cook in the "Big Brother House", a community centre in the lower Shankill which Adair used as his headquarters and where his henchmen brought disobedient locals for punishment beatings. In the early 2000s, however, Millar found herself deeply embroiled in an internal feud within the UDA.

On 24 December 2002, as part of the feud, a rival, anti-Adair unit set fire to Millar's caravan home in Groomsport park, burning it to the ground. Millar, who was in Belfast at the time, was devastated by the arson attack as she regarded the caravan as a second home for her and her 63-year-old husband. Describing herself as a "community worker in the lower Shankill" who worked with "the young and old, trying to make life better for them", she claimed she knew the identity of the perpetrators calling them "the scum of the earth". Ulster Democratic Party member and staunch Adair ally John White laid the blame firmly on the North Belfast UDA. She had previously suffered a stroke and told the News Letter how saddened she was to have lost the caravan: "I have a lot of memories of the place and the people there. I used to go down to the caravan in March and stay there until around the end of September because I loved it so much." Following the incident, Millar turned her Shankill Road home into a fortress in case of further attacks.

In early 2003, Adair, who was imprisoned at the time, allegedly gave orders from his prison cell for the elimination of his biggest rival John Gregg, leader of the UDA South East Antrim Brigade. C Company's young military commander Alan McCullough hastened to do Adair's bidding and orchestrated Gregg's killing. The brigadier was shot dead in a taxi near Belfast docks along with Rab Carson after the men had returned from a Rangers F.C. match in Glasgow on 1 February 2003. The killing of Gregg infuriated the UDA Inner Council which had already expelled Adair and his entire C Company unit from the mainstream organisation the previous September. (Note: The Inner Council was the UDA leadership made of the brigadiers who represented the six brigade areas.) Gregg enjoyed much popularity among the loyalist community for his attempted assassination of Sinn Féin president Gerry Adams in 1984. On the day of Gregg's funeral, carloads of angry UDA men led by South Belfast brigadier Jackie McDonald convened on Adair's Boundary Way stronghold in the lower Shankill. McDonald also detested Adair and had been one of the UDA leaders who sanctioned his expulsion. Adair's wife, Gina, John White, and about 20 of his supporters including Millar's sons were compelled to leave Northern Ireland. The rogue group headed for Scotland and afterwards England.

=== Expulsion from Northern Ireland ===
Millar believed her years of devotion to the organisation would allow her to remain in her Shankill Road home. Her pleas fell on deaf ears as the UDA Inner Council maintained she was fully aware of her sons' drug-dealing and loan-sharking activities, and that they had stolen over ten thousand pounds of UDA funds. Two weeks after the Adair faction was kicked out of Northern Ireland, Millar was also ordered to leave and told she'd be executed if she failed to comply. She reluctantly joined her sons and the other Adair supporters in Bolton where they became known as the "Bolton Wanderers". Adair's former friend Mo Courtney had already defected back to the mainstream UDA and was appointed commander of Adair's West Belfast Brigade in lieu of Millar's son-in-law, "Fat" Jackie Thompson who had served as brigadier during Adair's imprisonment. He had also fled to England.

Millar could not adjust to her new life as an exile in England and felt homesick for Northern Ireland. Defying the UDA leadership, she returned home and immediately applied to the Housing Executive for a house in Bangor, County Down. Once the UDA in Belfast discovered she had disobeyed orders by returning, she was immediately subjected to threats and had the windows of her home smashed with bricks. When English journalists called to her house she loudly announced: "I'm staying, no-one will put me out!" The next day the Bolton hideout her sons were sharing with Gina Adair, "Fat" Jackie Thompson, and Sham's girlfriend was raked with machinegun fire. Nobody was injured in the attack which was carried out by Alan McCullough as a means to ingratiate himself with Mo Courtney and the new C Company leadership to be allowed to return home. Shortly after his return he was abducted and killed by the Ulster Freedom Fighters (UFF), a covername for the UDA.
