= Jackie Thompson =

Northern Irish loyalist activist (born 1963)

- Born: John Thompson; 13 November 1963 (age 62); Belfast, Northern Ireland
- Military career
- Allegiance: Ulster Defence Association
- Rank: Brigadier
- Nickname: Fat Jackie
- Units: C Company, West Belfast Brigade
- Conflict: The Troubles

John Albert Thompson (born 13 November 1963), commonly known as Fat Jackie, is a Northern Irish loyalist activist who was a senior member of the Ulster Defence Association (UDA). Thompson was close to Johnny Adair during Adair's time as leader of the UDA West Belfast Brigade and remained one of the last of the "C Company" members to support Adair. Thompson was briefly brigadier in West Belfast in 2003 between Adair's imprisonment and his fall.

== Early years ==
A native of Snugville Street in the middle section of the Shankill Road, Thompson's parents ran a sweet shop on the road and the young Jackie Thompson gained his nickname at an early age due to his habit of eating large quantities of his parents' stock. Thompson was a contemporary of Johnny Adair, Sam McCrory, Donald Hodgen and James and Herbie Millar, and along with them was part of a racist skinhead gang that congregated on the Lower Shankill Road and neighbouring Lower Oldpark area in the early 1980s. The gang officially attended Somerdale School on the Crumlin Road together, although they would frequently play truant and spend their days taking bus rides into the neighbouring countryside where they would drink cider bought under-age by the unusually tall Hodgen.

Having become involved in anti-social behaviour the gang, as a unit (by that point around twelve or so members), were co-opted into the local UDA and Thompson and the others were sworn in as members of the West Belfast Brigade's C Company at a ceremony in the Langley Social Club on the Shankill's Tennent Street in 1984. They were assigned to C8, a unit of the company. In their early years of membership the gang had little activity of note. A typical incident occurred in 1985 when Thompson, Adair, Hodgen and McCrory were sent to the Pork Produce factory on the nearby Hillview Road to burn their fleet of vans as the local UDA leadership objected to the number of Catholics employed by the company.

== Activity with C8 ==
C8 soon became known as one of the most active units in the company, gaining a reputation for being home to a coterie of young hot bloods who were eager to kill. According to David Lister and Hugh Jordan, Thompson played a central role in the killing of Catholic civilian Eamon Quinn in February 1990. They state that Thompson had fired the initial shots that wounded Quinn before Ken Barrett shot the injured man in the head and stomach, killing him. This was Thompson's first hit, according to the authors. He would soon develop a reputation as a skilled marksman amongst fellow C Company members.

On 31 July 1990 several members of C Company drove up Lanark Way, which links the Shankill to the Irish nationalist Springfield Road where they shot and killed 34-year-old John Judge as he stood outside his house. According to Lister and Jordan, Thompson, who by this stage weighed 22 stone and as a result had some difficulty fleeing the scene of the crime, had fired the initial shots at Judge before he was killed by James "Sham" Millar. In the aftermath of the attack Thompson was arrested along with Adair and McCrory although in the event no charges were made for this attack and instead all three were charged with three other failed murder attempts. A lack of evidence saw the case dropped in December of the same year.

In July 1992 Thompson was despatched along with McCrory, Tommy Potts and Matthew McCormick as a C Company hit team with the aim of killing Provisional Irish Republican Army commanders Brian Gillen and Martin Lynch in their Andersonstown stronghold. However the security forces had prior intelligence that the attack was due to take place and set up a joint British Army and Royal Ulster Constabulary ambush in nearby Finaghy Road North. Thompson and his fellow volunteers came under heavy gunfire before being apprehended. All four men faced prison sentences following the operation. Thompson pleaded guilty to charges of conspiracy to murder and was sentenced to 16 years in prison. His role as leading hitman in C Company was filled by Stephen McKeag.

== Rise in UDA ==
Thompson was held in the Maze prison and soon became Officer Commanding of 'D' Wing of H7, the area of the prison in which West Belfast UDA prisoners were held. Thompson had been released from prison by 2000 when Johnny Adair moved into the Beirut area of the lower Shankill as the two old friends became neighbours.

Thompson remained close to Adair who gave him the title of "Provost Marshal", a role which effectively gave him control over knee-cappings and other acts of extrajudicial punishment in the Shankill area. With the Brigadier's blessing, Thompson even kneecapped Jonathan "Mad Pup" Adair in August 2002, after the 17-year-old had burgled a local pensioner's house and punched a female worker in a Crumlin Road shop. In September of that year Thompson, along with James "Sham" Millar, accompanied an armed Adair to a meeting of the UDA brigadiers at which he was questioned about his role in the attempted killing of East Belfast brigadier Jim Gray. Adair would be expelled from the UDA soon after this meeting and he declared the West Belfast Brigade fully autonomous. Thompson remained a loyal cohort of Adair's and at his behest led a punishment squad to attack UDA veteran Milton Dodds after he had criticised what he felt was the harsh treatment of his cousin William Mullan, whom Adair had ordered out of Northern Ireland because of alleged links to his rivals the Shoukri brothers. Milton Dodds' brother William "Winkie" Dodds, one of Adair's oldest allies, moved to the Whitewell Road and placed himself under the protection of the UDA South East Antrim Brigade in response to Thompson's attack on his brother.

As an all-out war with the rest of the UDA loomed, Johnny Adair was returned to prison on 10 January 2003 and he appointed Thompson as brigadier in his stead. Under Adair's instruction, Thompson linked up with McCrory and the two planned to kill Adair's rival, the South East Antrim Brigadier John Gregg. Gregg was killed, albeit by two young gunmen using Thompson and McCrory's plans, on 1 February. The mainstream UDA under Jackie McDonald prepared to launch an assault on the lower Shankill and Thompson heard rumours that this was to happen. Fearing what might result from the attack he followed a number of other C Company members in fleeing the Shankill on 4 February to go to Scotland. McDonald's men arrived the following day, forcibly removing those left of Adair's supporters. Adair would later claim that Thompson had appointed himself brigadier and denounced him and Donald Hodgen as "the cowards at the top" for their refusal to remain on the Shankill and confront McDonald's men.

== Life in Britain ==
Thompson was detained by police at Cairnryan for a while after he was found to be in possession of £7,000 in cash, the takings from a sandwich shop he had just opened with Millar and the contents of a slot machine in the "Big Brother House", a community centre used by Adair and C Company as a base. Eventually released, he made his way to Bolton where Adair had connections with local Combat 18 activists. With the West Belfast Brigade having been brought back into the UDA fold Mo Courtney was confirmed as Thompson's successor as Brigadier.

In December 2003 Thompson was targeted by a car bomb and, although the detonator went off as he drove away from his home, the bomb placed under the driver's seat failed to explode and he survived the attack. Stanley Curry of Yardley, who was said to belong to the "Ulster Freedom Fighters West Midlands and Midlands Brigade" was charged with the attack soon afterwards. Curry, a train driver, was given a twenty-year prison sentence for the attempted bombing.

Adair's supporters had a series of quarrels in Bolton and by 2004 Thompson was reported to be working for £8 an hour on a building site in Manchester. By this stage Thompson and "Sham" Millar, who were brothers-in-law, had already quarrelled with Gary "Smickers" Smyth, resulting in their former C Company comrade severing ties to the so-called "Bolton wanderers" and relocating to Scotland. Rumours circulated in 2005 that Thompson and Millar had beaten up Adair in England after a falling out and, whilst Adair denied the rumours, he dismissed the pair as "bullies", suggesting that their friendship was over.

Thompson is married to the daughter of Wendy Millar, founder of the first UDA women's unit on the Shankill Road.

Other offices
Preceded by Johnny Adair	Ulster Defence Association West Belfast Brigadier; 2003	Succeeded by Mo Courtney
