= Alan McCullough (loyalist) =

Northern Ireland loyalist (1981–2003)

- Born: July 1981; Belfast, Northern Ireland
- Died: 28 May 2003 (aged 21); Newtownabbey, Northern Ireland
- Cause of death: Two gunshot wounds to the head
- Burial place: Roselawn Cemetery, Belfast
- Known for: Ulster Defence Association (UDA) member and military commander of its C Company West Belfast Brigade
- Parent(s): William "Bucky" McCullough; Barbara McCullough

Alan McCullough (July 1981 – 28 May 2003) was a Northern Ireland loyalist and a member of the Ulster Defence Association (UDA). He served as the organisation's military commander for the West Belfast Brigade's notorious C Company which was then headed by Johnny Adair.

McCullough was suspected of having organised the killing of South East Antrim brigadier John Gregg in February 2003. Gregg was a rival of Adair's who enjoyed much popularity among loyalists on account of his attempted assassination of Sinn Féin president Gerry Adams in 1984. The killing provoked outrage amongst the other UDA leaders and as a result Adair and his associates, including McCullough, were forced to leave Northern Ireland. McCullough returned to Belfast in April 2003 but a month later he disappeared from his home in the company of two men. On 5 June his body was found in a shallow grave in Mallusk, County Antrim. The UDA claimed responsibility for the killing using their cover name Ulster Freedom Fighters (UFF).

== Ulster Defence Association ==
Alan McCullough was born in Belfast, Northern Ireland into a loyalist Ulster Protestant family, the youngest of six children. He had four sisters and a brother, Kenny. He was brought up in Denmark Street in the Lower Shankill Road area. His father William "Bucky" McCullough was a prominent UDA member gunned down by the Irish National Liberation Army (INLA) outside his home on 16 October 1981 when McCullough was three months old. It was believed by many inside the UDA that he had been set up by UDA fundraiser and racketeer Jim Craig.

McCullough's family background led him to join the UDA at an early age. From an early age McCullough had idolised Johnny Adair. and he would soon become a trusted ally of the Brigadier. He had been one of a number of members of Ulster Young Militants whom Adair had promoted to the ranks of C Company around 2002, all of whom looked up to Adair as a father figure and were loyal to him personally. McCullough, who had joined UYM aged sixteen, wore a graven image of his late father on a gold chain around his neck and often spoke of wanting to rise up the ranks in the UDA to kill republicans in revenge for his father's death.

McCullough had initially annoyed Adair when in early 2002 he and Adair's son Jonathan "Mad Pup" Adair had followed a young customer from the drug-dealing flats used by C Company and attacked and mugged him. The boy, who had been wearing a Catholic school uniform at the time, told his mother who complained to John White who in turn assured her that something would be done about it. Adair insisted that the drugs flat, which was C Company's main source of income, should be kept free from sectarianism and that all money should be welcomed regardless of source. As a result, Adair, who was in prison at the time, sent out word to his "provost marshal" (as the organisation called the member charged with maintaining internal order and discipline) Tommy Potts to punish McCullough and his son and as a result Potts and his squad administered punishment beatings to both McCullough and "Mad Pup".

Despite McCullough's transgression Adair still held him in high esteem and soon after his release from prison he appointed McCullough commander of C Company, a role Adair himself had held before becoming West Belfast brigadier. McCullough had replaced Adair's old friend Mo Courtney in the role, after the two had become estranged over Adair's treatment of their mutual friend Winkie Dodds. Courtney as a result was forced off the Shankill, allowing McCullough the opportunity to assume command of C Company. By this time McCullough was ranked as a lieutenant within the UDA. He was, however, soon to become embroiled in an internal UDA feud.

=== John Gregg shooting ===
Adair's foremost rival John Gregg, the head of the UDA's South East Antrim Brigade was shot dead in a taxi along with Rab Carson after the men had returned to Belfast from watching a Rangers F.C. football match in Glasgow on 1 February 2003. The killing took place in the old Sailortown district of Belfast near the docks. Gregg's 18-year-old son Stuart was in the taxi but escaped injury. McCullough had allegedly orchestrated Gregg's shooting on Adair's behalf. According to Henry McDonald and Jim Cusack, McCullough, under orders from the imprisoned Adair, had paid two young brothers who were members of C Company £100 for carrying out the killing. An anonymous friend of McCullough's stated that "he was involved in a number of shootings and would have done anything that Adair asked him to do". Gregg was considered a loyalist hero and as such enjoyed much popularity within UDA circles on account of his attempted assassination of Sinn Féin president Gerry Adams in 1984; his murder by the Adair faction infuriated the UDA leadership.

The day of Gregg's funeral, carloads of angry UDA units led by South Belfast brigadier Jackie McDonald arrived at Adair's Boundary Way home in the Lower Shankill to expel the entire Adair team from Northern Ireland; Adair's wife, Gina, staunch ally John White and about 20 supporters were forced to flee to Scotland and England. McCullough was among those who quit Northern Ireland. He and his girlfriend went to Lancashire but he found life with the group (whom the press nicknamed the "Bolton wanderers" after the football club of the same name due to their habit of moving between the homes of Combat 18 members in and around Bolton) to be tiresome. McCullough's girlfriend soon returned home with their baby son and he was left sleeping on a camp bed in Gina Adair's house, sharing a room with fellow former C Company youngsters "Mad Pup" Adair and Wayne and Benjy Dowie.

By April he was feeling homesick and asked Mo Courtney, Adair's successor as West Belfast brigadier, permission to return to Belfast. McCullough's mother Barbara also allegedly begged Courtney to allow her son to come home. Courtney had become a bitter enemy of Adair despite their previous close friendship. It was suggested that to ingratiate himself with Courtney and the new C Company leadership McCullough launched a shooting attack on Gina Adair's house in Bolton. McCullough also promised to provide Courtney with Gina's address in exchange for his safety. He returned to Belfast that month, having also given Courtney the whereabouts of a drugs haul that had been buried by members of Adair's C Company in the Shankill.

== Assassination ==
On 28 May 2003 he left his mother's house in Denmark Street in the company of two UDA men. They drove off together and he was never seen alive again. The men had told his mother that McCullough would be safe with them and they initially took him for a meal at the Hilton Hotel in Templepatrick to discuss the whereabouts of the "Bolton wanderers" and further drugs caches. However, on the drive back they stopped the car and, following a struggle, shot McCullough twice in the head. The police conducted a manhunt after he was reported missing. On 5 June his body was found in a shallow grave in the Mallusk area of Newtownabbey after the police received a tip-off by workmen who had spotted the body.

The following evening, about 60 women and children marched along the Shankill Road carrying placards and a banner in protest against his killing.

The UDA claimed the killing using their cover name "Ulster Freedom Fighters" (UFF) adding that it was carried out in retaliation for his alleged involvement in Gregg's shooting death. From exile in Bolton, Adair supporter Herbie Millar read a statement refuting claims made by the UFF that McCullough had been killed for his part in the deaths of Gregg and Jonathan Stewart, the nephew of a UDA member killed at a party in the Lower Oldpark area of north-west Belfast at Christmas 2002. Herbie and his brother James "Sham" Millar (another Adair associate) are the sons of Wendy "Bucket" Millar, a UDA founding member who had set up the first women's unit in the Shankill Road. A staunch Adair supporter, she was also one of those ordered out of Northern Ireland in the wake of the UDA's purge of the rogue Adair gang.

Prior to McCullough's funeral on 16 June graffiti appeared on the Shankill justifying the murder and threats were also made against his brother Kenny. The funeral itself was attended by several thousand mourners, with McCullough's body removed from his home to the sounds of "You'll Never Walk Alone", the anthem of his beloved Liverpool F.C., and "The Best", which had been used as the theme song of the West Belfast Brigade in Adair's heyday. He was buried in Roselawn Cemetery.

== Aftermath ==
Courtney and Ihab Shoukri were arrested for McCullough's murder soon afterwards and, whilst charges against Shoukri were quickly dropped, Courtney proceeded to trial. A detective sergeant told the non-jury Diplock court that, when being charged with the murder, Courtney had replied, "Definitely not guilty". He went on to maintain that he was able to connect Courtney with the charges. However, Courtney was acquitted of the murder in 2006 after the judge in his Diplock court trial ruled that there were flaws in the evidence provided by McCullough's family and an anonymous "witness A".

Following his release, the Court of Appeal passed judgement that his acquittal had been unsound and ordered a retrial. At the retrial Courtney was given an eight-year prison sentence after confessing to the manslaughter of McCullough. His version of events, which was accepted by the court, was that Courtney believed he was to be involved only in a knee-capping of McCullough but that another person present had actually done the killing.

== See also ==
- Loyalist feud
