= Martin Lynch =

Martin Lynch may refer to:

- Martin Lynch (Irish republican), reportedly a member of the Provisional Irish Republican Army Army Council
- Martin Lynch (mayor), mayor of Galway
- Martin Lynch (writer), playwright and theatre director from Belfast
- Marty Lynch (Australian footballer), Australian rules footballer
- Marty Lynch (Gaelic footballer) (1963–2023), Northern Irish Gaelic footballer and association footballer
- Martin Lynch (Gaelic footballer) (born 1970), Irish Gaelic footballer
