= Hodgen =

Hodgen is a surname. Notable people with the name include:

- Donald Hodgen (born 1963), Northern Irish loyalist, former member of the Ulster Defence Association
- Margaret Hodgen (1890–1977), American sociologist and author
- William Hodgen (1866–1943), Australian architect

== See also ==
- Hodgen, Oklahoma, unincorporated community in Le Flore County, Oklahoma, United States
