= Donald Hodgen =

Northern Irish loyalist and former UDA member (born 1963)

- Born: 25 May 1963 (age 63); Belfast, Northern Ireland
- Known for: Ulster Defence Association (UDA) member and commander of its C Company, 2nd Battalion Shankill Road, West Belfast Brigade

Donald Hodgen (born 25 May 1963) is a Northern Irish loyalist and a former member of the Ulster Defence Association (UDA). He was best known as the commander and chief enforcer of West Belfast Brigade leader Johnny Adair's notorious C Company which operated on the Shankill Road.

== Early years ==
Born into a Protestant family in Belfast, Northern Ireland in May 1963, Hodgen grew up on Albertville Drive in the loyalist Lower Oldpark area, which is close to the Lower Shankill. In the early 1980s he joined a racist skinhead gang based in the Lower Shankill and Lower Oldpark areas which included Johnny Adair, Sam McCrory, "Fat" Jackie Thompson, James and Herbie Millar amongst its membership. Hodgen, Adair, McCrory and Thompson were all classmates at the Somerdale School on the Crumlin Road. and, although the gang still officially attended the school, they would frequently skip school, catch a public bus into the near-countryside and consume large quantities of cider. This was always procured by Hodgen, who was much taller than the rest of the gang and so appeared older than he actually was. Hodgen formed a close friendship with Adair during their time together in the skinhead gang.

The gang began to gather outside the Buffs Club on the corner of the Crumlin Road and Century Street, where their numbers were swollen by other young men from in and around the Shankill. The imposing Hodgen, who for a time had a red-white-and-blue mohican and had tattoos on his head of the Union Flag and the legend "Oi! Skins", became the most recognised face of the gang. The gang became involved in petty crime, progressing steadily into more violent activities and even formed a Rock Against Communism-styled band called "Offensive Weapon". Although Hodgen did not play with the group he and another skinhead called Marty, who was English-based and more usually worked for Skrewdriver, were the band's road crew for their gigs. Part of the Offensive Weapon's performance would see Hodgen and Marty invade the stage at the end of the band's set and attack the band members, to the delight of the audience.

The gang, which was part of a wider group in loyalist north and west Belfast known as the "NF Skinz" because of their vague support for the National Front, gained widespread notoriety on 14 January 1981 when "Seig Heiling" members launched a brutal attack on anti-racist fans of The Specials and The Beat when the two bands played a concert at the Ulster Hall. Hodgen was present at this event as well as the August 1983 "Gluesniffers March", when 200 skinheads descended on Belfast City Hall determined to riot with Campaign for Nuclear Disarmament members, who were themselves holding a rally. The march took its name from the prevalence of solvent abuse among the skinheads. The gang was not sanctioned by the UDA leadership, and their activities led to South Belfast brigadier John McMichael declaring that he wanted the gang members "run out of town".

== Ulster Defence Association C Company ==
In 1984 Hodgen and the rest of the Century Street gang, whose low-level criminal and anti-social activity had inspired complaints by some locals to the UDA, were recruited into that organisation after being effectively told that if they did not join they would face the wrath of the local brigade. Along with Adair, McCrory and Thompson, Hodgen was assigned to C8, an active unit that formed part of the West Belfast Brigade's C Company, which covered the lower Shankill. The young members early duties mostly consisted of rioting, along with occasional gun attacks on heavily armoured police vehicles or arson attacks on local businesses felt to be employing "too many" Catholics. The unit however was eager to become more active and from an early stage plotted to kill solicitor Pat Finucane, although the plan was initially vetoed by the brigade leadership.

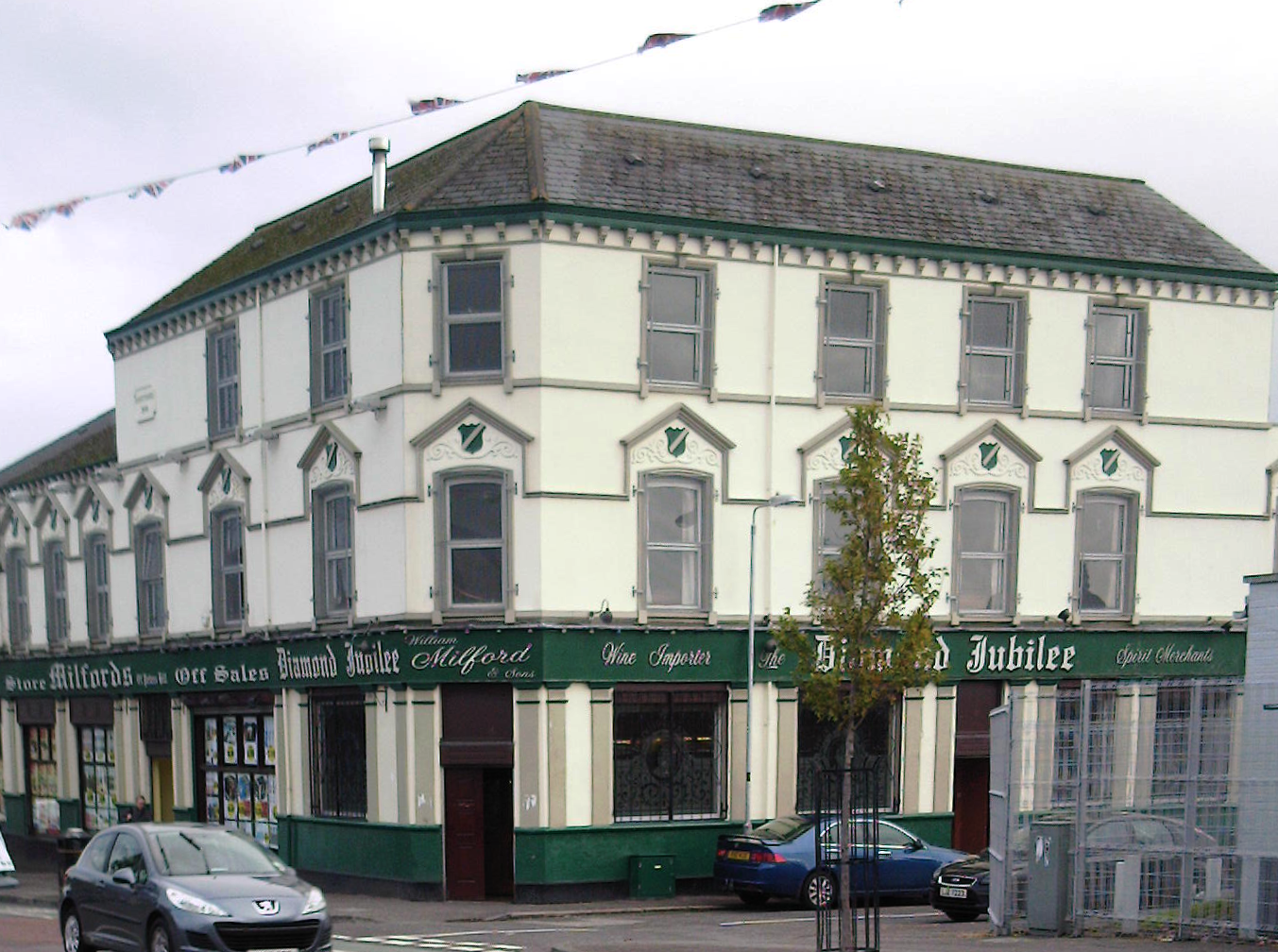
The "Diamond Jubilee", UDA C Company's favourite bar on the Shankill Road

Things changed however in 1990 when Tommy Lyttle was removed as West Belfast brigadier and, under new leadership, Adair and C8 began to emerge as the leading unit in the brigade. Adair formed a so-called "Dream Team" of active gunmen with Hodgen a charter member of this group. Hodgen, who had a reputation for being taciturn in contrast to the vocal Adair, regularly accompanied Adair on most of his activities, acting as his unofficial bodyguard. The pair were together on 6 March 1993 when Adair's Vauxhall Cavalier was shot up by a Provisional IRA gunman as it sat on a Shankill back street. Hodgen was shot in the shoulder and Adair in the leg but both men survived the attack despite the car being riddled with bullets. According to Adair's sometime girlfriend Jackie "Legs" Robinson, Hodgen was also present at the killing of Noel Cardwell, a glass collector in C Company's favourite bar the "Diamond Jubilee", whom the group accused of being an informer. Cardwell, who suffered from learning difficulties, had been hospitalised after having his drink spiked with ecstasy by a C Company member and had named the members to police who visited him in hospital, not realising the Omertà-style code that C Company operated under. Cardwell was taken to a house used for interrogations and knifed on the evening of 12 December 1993, his body being discovered the next morning.

In 1993 Adair took over as West Belfast Brigadier following the arrest of incumbent Jim Spence. Adair had been commander of C Company at that point and so he promoted Hodgen to that role, with Winkie Dodds serving as Hodgen's second in command. Under Hodgen's command C Company continued to be a highly active outlet for sectarian killings and he became known as Adair's chief enforcer. Hodgen's command came to an end on 16 May 1994 when he was arrested as part of a Royal Ulster Constabulary (RUC) operation in which around twenty leading members of the West Belfast Brigade were arrested on terrorism charges. It was standard practice in the UDA that an office-holder vacated their position whenever they were taken into custody. Whilst some members, including Adair, were imprisoned as part of this operation Hodgen was released soon after his arrest.

Activity in west Belfast diminished somewhat due to Adair's imprisonment and the Combined Loyalist Military Command (CLMC) ceasefire. However this began to change in 1999 when a released Adair began to expand into the drugs trade and also looked to rearm C Company for future activities. In November 1999 Adair and his wife Gina moved into a house on Boundary Way in the "Beirut" area of the lower Shankill, with Hodgen among a number of leading C Company figures who became Adair's neighbours as a consequence. A loyalist feud with the Ulster Volunteer Force (UVF) soon ensued, although this was ended by Adair's return to prison in 2000.

Hodgen remained loyal to Adair's leadership until the end, attacking Winkie Dodds' brother in late 2002. The attack followed a falling out between Dodds and Adair over a debt owed by Dodds' brother-in-law to C Company. Hodgen did however have some private reservations about Adair's increasingly erratic behaviour at this period and in early 2003 when he learned that Adair intended to kill another C Company member Mo Courtney – due to suspicions that he was an informer – Hodgen tipped Courtney off about the plan, allowing him to escape before any hit could take place. By this point however Hodgen had effectively retired from the UDA and when Adair was returned to prison in January 2003 the two old friends had no further contact. He dropped out of the public eye altogether and as such was not part of the group of C Company die-hards forced out of the Shankill Road by the mainstream UDA that same year. Hodgen's lack of involvement in this incident led to Adair condemning him and Jackie Thompson, who fled the Shankill before the arrival of around 100 UDA members after hearing about the plan in advance, as "the cowards at the top".

Following the purge of Adair supporters Hodgen was said to be living in Portavogie with the sister of fellow C Company veteran Tommy Potts.

== Bibliography ==
- Lister, David & Jordan, Hugh (2004). Mad Dog: The Rise and Fall of Johnny Adair and C Company. Edinburgh: Mainstream.
- McDonald, Henry & Cusack, Jim (2004). UDA – Inside the Heart of Loyalist Terror. Dublin: Penguin Ireland
- Wood, Ian S. (2006). Crimes of Loyalty: A History of the UDA. Edinburgh: Edinburgh University Press.
