= Sam McCrory =

Sam McCrory may refer to:

- Sammy McCrory (1924–2011), footballer for Ipswich Town and Northern Ireland
- Sam McCrory (loyalist) (born 1963), gay rights activist and former UDA paramilitary nicknamed "Skelly"
