= Real Ulster Freedom Fighters =

Loyalist paramilitary organisation in Northern Ireland

The Real Ulster Freedom Fighters, otherwise known as the Real UFF, is a dissident loyalist paramilitary group in Northern Ireland. It was founded in early 2007 by former members of the Ulster Defence Association (UDA) /Ulster Freedom Fighters (UFF). They reportedly committed 24 attacks from 2009 to 2011 in County Antrim. They are believed to number fewer than 50 members.

On 30 March 2023 a new 'Real Ulster Freedom Fighters' announced its formation. This movement also split from the UDA.

Much of its membership and the organisation itself have been accused of being involved in criminality and has been ostracized by much of the loyalist movement, with them being blamed for bringing heroin into Newtownards They have also been accused of asking the New IRA for protection in prison in return they would give them information on police officers locations, and even offered to offer them safehouses in Down if the attack were to take place there.

== Formation ==
The group announced its existence on 1 April 2007, shortly after the St Andrews Agreement. In a statement, the group said:

We have had enough of people telling us what to do - if the opportunity arises we will take out the entire UDA leadership because they are selling us out. Protestant areas are still awash with drugs and we are not going to stand by while so-called loyalists line their pockets.

The group claimed to have drawn-up a "death list" that included:

- The leadership of the UDA
- Ousted UDA commander Johnny Adair
- Alleged RUC Special Branch agents William 'Mo' Courtney and Jim Spence
- Loyalists suspected of being drug dealers
- The leadership of the Continuity Irish Republican Army and Real Irish Republican Army

The Real UFF also claimed to have an arsenal that includes rocket launchers, AK-47 assault rifles, handguns, pipe bombs, coffee-jar bombs and under-car booby-trap devices. However it is unknown if these weapons are still in their possession.

They were said by Sunday Life to be an alliance between former supporters of Gary "Smickers" Smyth and others who had been close to the Shoukri brothers.

== Timeline of attacks ==
- 24 July 2009: the Real UFF claimed responsibility for a pipe bomb attack on a house in Brantwood Gardens, Antrim. Five people narrowly escaped injury when the device exploded in the front garden. The house was owned by a Catholic family and was in a mixed Catholic–Protestant area.
- 25 September 2009: the Real UFF claimed responsibility for leaving a small bomb outside a house in the Fountain Lane area of Antrim. It failed to explode.
- 15 January 2010: the Real UFF claimed responsibility for planting two explosive devices near a community centre in Antrim that was being used by members of the Gaelic Athletic Association. Police described the devices as "crude but non-viable".
- February 2010: The Real UFF made a death threat against the Sinn Féin MLA for North Belfast, Gerry Kelly.
- 11 March 2010: Sinn Féin president Gerry Adams revealed he had received a death threat from the Real UFF. He was reportedly told that he was to be executed by the "Real UFF C company".
- 13 March 2010: the Real UFF claimed responsibility for a gun attack on a house in Antrim. A shot was fired through a window, but no-one was injured in the attack.
- 11 August 2010: the Real UFF claimed responsibility for leaving a pipe bomb on the windowsill of a house on Fir Grove Lane, Antrim. It failed to explode. The house was owned by a Catholic family.
- 12 August 2010: the Real UFF were blamed for planting two pipe bombs outside separate houses in Antrim. One of the bombs partially exploded, causing damage to the front of a house. Both were later defused by the British Army.
- 6 September 2010: the Real UFF were blamed for planting a pipe bomb in the grounds of a Catholic primary school (St Comgall's) in Antrim. The bomb was found by an eight-year-old boy, who handed it to a teacher. The school was then evacuated and the bomb was defused by the British Army.
- 1 November 2010: the Real UFF claimed responsibility for two pipe bomb attacks in the St James area of West Belfast – one of which exploded, the other of which was made safe by the British Army. They said one bomb was left at the wrong home, while the second targeted a local prominent Irish republican.
- 12 October 2011: the Real UFF claimed responsibility for planting a pipe bomb on the windowsill of a Polish couple's house in Steeple Road estate, Antrim. They claimed it was part of a "fightback" in that area. Democratic Unionist Party council election candidate John Smyth was charged with making pipe bombs related to this attack, and possibly other pipe bomb attacks committed by the Real UFF. In April 2013 he was jailed for three years for his role in the attack.
- 31 July 2012: the Real UFF are believed to have been responsible for planting a pipe bomb in Steeple Road estate in South Antrim, despite never claiming responsibility for it. The bomb was made safe by British Army bomb experts.
- 25 February 2013: the Real UFF claimed responsibility for a bomb blast on the doorstep of a North Belfast woman. The explosion happened shortly after the woman heard a knock on her door, and the blast injured her and her two pet dogs.
- April 2023: Loyalist activist Jamie Bryson received death threat from a group calling itself the "Real UFF".
- May 2023: A group calling itself "The Real UFF" have been responsible for ongoing tensions in North Down, related to a loyalist feud involving a drug gang.
- June 2023: It was revealed that undercover police had been bugging the homes of Real UFF members, a source for the Sunday World said "These people are a joke" and the source stated that they are "despised by the local community, by mainstream loyalists and just about everybody else" In the bugging they had apparently talked of plans to murder someone and a member is also being investigated for posing with a gun in a picture.

== See also ==
- Orange Volunteers
- Red Hand Defenders
- Timeline of Ulster Defence Association actions
