= Mo Courtney =

Ulster loyalist (born 1963)

- Born: William Samuel Courtney; 8 July 1963 (age 63); Belfast, Northern Ireland
- Military career
- Allegiance: Ulster Defence Association (UDA)
- Rank: Commander
- Units: C Company, 2nd Battalion Shankill Road, West Belfast Brigade
- Conflict: The Troubles

William Samuel "Mo" Courtney (born 8 July 1963) is a former Ulster Defence Association (UDA) activist. He was a leading figure in Johnny Adair's C Company, one of the most active sections of the UDA, before later falling out with Adair and serving as West Belfast brigadier.

== Early years ==
Courtney was born in Belfast in July 1963.

In the late 1970s and early 1980s Courtney was part in a gang of teenagers from Belfast's Shankill Road and nearby districts who spent their days near the Buffs Club on Century Street in the nearby Oldpark district. This gang included Johnny "Mad Dog" Adair with whom Courtney formed a friendship. The gang as a group had joined C8, one of around eighteen teams of 30 to 60 men that made up C Company of the 2nd Battalion of the Ulster Freedom Fighters, over a period of several months in 1984. Courtney and Adair became closer as the 1980s went on and on 23 November 1985 they attended the "Ulster Says No" rally against the Anglo-Irish Agreement at Belfast City Hall together. According to Courtney the signing of the Agreement saw a surge of recruits to the UDA in general and C Company in particular, leading to an upswing in violent activity.

Courtney had a reputation as something of a petty thief and even suffered a punishment beating from more senior members of the UDA for a spate of burglaries on the Shankill. However Courtney was taken away from these habits by William "Winkie" Dodds, an old family friend of the Courtneys who was five years older than Mo. Initially recruiting just Courtney, before also adding Adair and others from Oldpark, Dodds trained the youngsters in weapons use to prepare them for active service.

== UDA activity ==
Courtney was soon sent out as a gunman and was allegedly active in killing by around 1987. During the 1980s he headed an Active Service Unit (ASU) of the UDA in West Belfast. He was questioned in regards to the 1989 murder of Pat Finucane in 2002.

During the late 1980s, Courtney was part of a movement within the UDA that became frustrated with the directions being taken by the UDA leadership. He argued that too little was being done by the movement in terms of killing republicans as the leaders were too happy to sit back and become rich from extortion and racketeering. Courtney was soon involved in conspiracies to overthrow the UDA leadership. These however came to nothing as the fallout from the Stevens Inquiries saw the existing leadership swept aside. For his part, Courtney would go on to become part of the new leadership that emerged in the 1990s around Johnny Adair.

Courtney was jailed in 1991 for robbery, theft and hijacking, and soon became a leading figure within the Maze prison. Along with Adair and Michael Stone, he met Democratic Unionist Party (DUP) politician and then Lord Mayor of Belfast, Rev Eric Smyth in the prison to discuss the possibility of a future prisoner release scheme.

He gained a reputation as a fearsome fighter and took a leading role in the battles with the Ulster Volunteer Force (UVF) during the internecine loyalist feud between Adair's men and the UVF in 2000. On 19 August 2000 when the feud broke out fully during the "loyalist day of culture" held on the Shankill Road, Courtney was identified as one of three UDA gunmen who shot at UVF members who had barricaded themselves in the "Rex Bar". Three people were injured in the gun attack with others wounded from a series of physical attacks by C Company members. Adair was returned to prison as the feud escalated and there he became close to the Shoukri brothers, leading figures in the North Belfast UDA. Courtney, along with other Adair cohorts such as Gary "Smickers" Smyth, teamed up the Shoukris whilst Adair was imprisoned and ran a lucrative drug dealing operation together.

In the 1990s he was the subject on an interview by British journalist Peter Taylor for his televised documentary and book Loyalists. During the interview he recounted his time as a gunman in the late 1980s when he was "on the go seven days a week" and "couldn't even afford a pint".

== Return to UDA mainstream ==
In late 2002 when Adair and his ally John White were expelled from the UDA Courtney remained loyal to "Mad Dog" and was the main guard at Adair's Shankill Road house, known colloquially as the "Big Brother House" after the setting of the then-popular TV series. However Adair had grown suspicious of the new relationship between Courtney and the Shoukris, whom Adair had come to see as rivals, and, believing that they were plotting against him, sent a hit team to kill Courtney. He managed to avoid the attack after being warned about it by his C Company colleague Donald Hodgen.

Following the killing of popular UDA man John Gregg, the leadership of the UDA under Jackie McDonald offered members of the UDA loyal to Adair the chance to defect back to the mainstream UDA whilst putting the word around that they intended to launch an all-out assault on Adair's Boundary Way stronghold on the lower Shankill. Realising that Adair's time was up, Courtney prepared to defect by visiting the mother of Johnny Adair's wife Gina Crossan and threatening her unless she told him the whereabouts of Adair's arms cache. Although Adair's mother-in-law was unable to give him the information he sought, Courtney was able to take weapons and money from a nearby C Company arms dump. He subsequently took these to the "Heather Social Club", the headquarters of those on the Shankill loyal to the mainstream UDA, where he affirmed his split from Adair and his new loyalty to McDonald. Courtney denounced Adair as a "treacherous bastard" for the attempted hit against him. Adair's supporters fled the Shankill a few days later (with Adair himself back in prison), and in a public show of loyalty to the new UDA regime, Courtney was filmed by television cameras defacing a mural Adair had ordered painted extolling the friendship between the UDA and the Loyalist Volunteer Force. This was part of a wider removal of murals, posters and graffiti in support of Adair and C Company.

== Alan McCullough ==
Courtney regained his influence within the UDA and replaced "Fat Jackie" Thompson as brigadier of the West Belfast UDA. As a result, it was he that Alan McCullough, who had fled to England with Adair, phoned in mid-2003 seeking permission to return to the Shankill having grown tired of life in exile in Bolton. McCullough promised Courtney to tell him the whereabouts of a huge haul of drugs stashed by C Company as well as the address of Gina Adair, whose house McCullough even shot at to prove his loyalty to the new leadership. McCullough was given permission to return although when he did so he was killed by the UDA at Mallusk near Templepatrick in a double cross on 28 May 2003. McCullough's murder caused widespread revulsion on the lower Shankill mainly on account of the treacherous nature of the killing. This resulted in Courtney, who still feared for his position within the UDA because of his long associations with Adair, going into hiding as he feared a possible retaliation.

Courtney, along with Ihab Shoukri, was arrested and charged with the murder of McCullough a few days later. He had been discovered in Carrickfergus where he had gone into hiding. However Courtney was acquitted of the murder in 2006. In a Diplock court trial the judge ruled that there were flaws in the evidence provided by McCullough's family and an anonymous "witness A".

Following his release, the Court of Appeal passed judgement that his acquittal had been unsound and ordered a retrial. Not long after this, in January 2007, Courtney was the victim of a savage attack on the Shankill Road by an old UVF rival.

At the retrial Courtney was given an eight-year prison sentence after confessing to manslaughter. His version of events, which was accepted by the court, was that Courtney believed he was to be involved only in a knee-capping of McCullough but that another person present had actually done the killing. Following his imprisonment, Barbara McCullough, the deceased's mother, claimed that Courtney had been a police agent and informer.

== Subsequent activity ==
Courtney has continued to be linked to the Finucane murder and in 2007, whilst serving his sentence for his involvement in McCullough's death, he was named as one of the two gunmen to kill Finucane in an affidavit filed in a Belfast court by Metropolitan Police officer Detective Chief Inspector Graham Taylor, who was at the time heading the investigation into the killing.

Courtney was released from prison and returned to his home in the Glencairn area to the north of the Shankill. However, in 2013 Courtney was convicted of the assault of Tracey Coulter at the offices of the Lower Shankill Community Association. According to court reports Coulter had gone to the offices to speak to Courtney's associates about the death of her cousin, a drug-user, a week earlier. During Coulter's visit she had become embroiled in an argument with an unnamed man when Courtney intervened and head-butted her. Courtney is due to be sentenced in January 2014. Coulter, who is the daughter of Jackie Coulter (a close associate of Adair's who was killed in the 2002 feud with the UVF), had her house burnt down in an arson attack soon after Courtney's conviction. She publicly accused the UDA of being behind the attack. In December 2013 Courtney was again brought before the courts, to face charges of harassing Coulter in the aftermath of his previous conviction, as well as threatening to kill campaigner Raymond McCord, who was with Courtney during the alleged incident. Courtney was given a suspended prison sentence of four months and ordered to pay Coulter £500 for the incident. He was subsequently also found guilty of threatening to kill McCord, although a similar charge relating to Coulter was dismissed.

=== North Belfast feud ===
Beginning in 2013 and continuing into the following year, a loyalist feud broke out within the UDA North Belfast Brigade between the supporters of its leader John Bunting and a dissident tendency based in Tigers Bay who sought to oust Bunting and install Robert Molyneaux as a replacement. From the start Bunting, as well as fellow brigadiers Jackie McDonald and Jimmy Birch, stated that elements within the West Belfast Brigade were closely involved with the dissidents and as a result the West Belfast Brigade split from the rest of the UDA.

Courtney was widely reported as one of the leading figures in the conspiracy and in early 2014 UDA leaders approached Matt Kincaid, offering him the chance to re-integrate the West Belfast Brigade with the wider UDA if he expelled Courtney and Jim Spence. Kincaid rejected the proposal however, opting instead to support Courtney and Spence. In September 2014 it was reported in the Belfast Telegraph that Bunting, McDonald and Birch, as well as the head of the Londonderry and North Antrim Brigade had met to discuss the feud as well as the schism with the West Belfast Brigade. According to the report they agreed that West Belfast Brigade members loyal to the wider UDA should establish a new command structure for the brigade which would then take the lead in ousting the three men they identified as the biggest trouble-makers, namely Courtney, Spence and Eric McKee from their existing leadership positions. It was also stated that the West Belfast breakaway leaders had recruited Jimbo Simpson, a former North Belfast brigadier driven out of Northern Ireland over a decade earlier, and were seeking to restore him to his former role.

Other offices
Preceded by Johnny Adair	Ulster Defence Association West Belfast Brigadier; 2002–2003	Succeeded by Jim Spence
