= Martin Lynch (mayor) =

Martin Lynch (a.k.a. Martin Lynch fitz James, i.e., Martin son of James Lynch) was Mayor of Galway from 1537 to 1538.

Lynch was Mayor when Galway was visited by Lord Deputy of Ireland, Leonard Grey, on 11 July 1538. This was the first visit of a King's Deputy to the town, and marked the start of closer relations between the sometimes-beleaguered town and the Anglo-Irish administration in Dublin. He was lavishly entertained and stayed for seven days.

Town statues during Lynch's term included one regulating sanctuary seekers, their goods and debts. Lynch may have been the father of a later Mayor, Ambrose Lynch fitz Martin, who served the term 1558-59.

Civic offices
Preceded by Rychard Martin	Mayor of Galway; 1537–1538	Succeeded by Seán an tSalainn French
