= Stephen McKeag =

Ulster loyalist (1970–2000)

Stevie McKeag
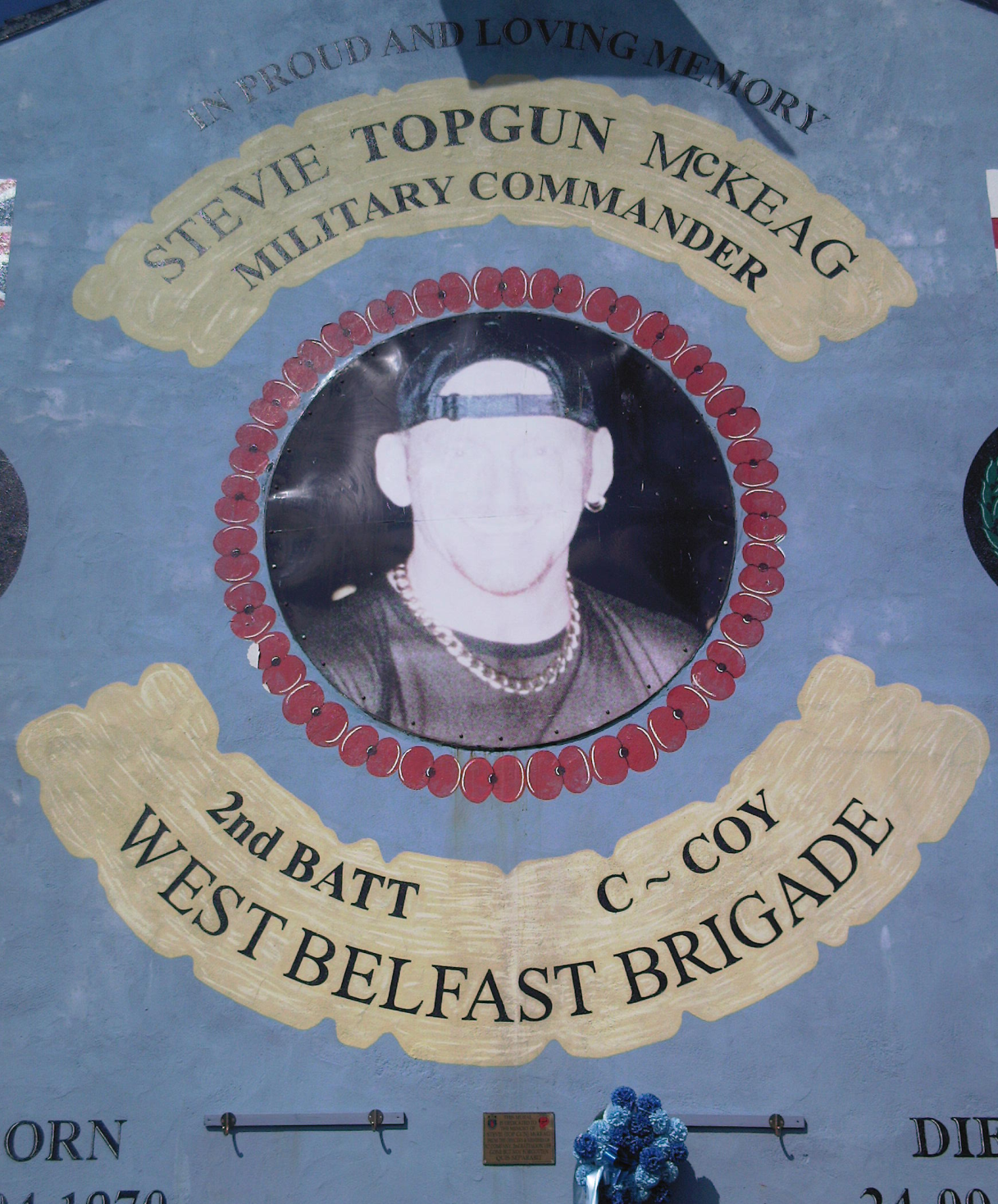
- Born: Stevie McKeag; 1 April 1970; Belfast, Northern Ireland
- Died: 24 September 2000 (aged 30); Belfast
- Burial place: Roselawn Cemetery, Belfast
- Military career
- Allegiance: Ulster Defence Association
- Rank: Commander
- Nickname: Top Gun
- Unit: C-Company, West Belfast Brigade
- Conflict: The Troubles

Stephen McKeag (1 April 1970 – 24 September 2000), nicknamed Top Gun, was a Northern Irish loyalist paramilitary and a Commander of the Ulster Defence Association's (UDA) 'C' Company in the 1990s. He is responsible for many killings of Catholics and Irish republicans. Although most of his operations took place from the Shankill Road in Belfast, McKeag was actually a native of the lower Oldpark Road in the north of the city.

== Early years ==
As a youth, McKeag's first group affiliation was with the neo-nazi white power skinhead gangs that existed on the Shankill and which were co-opted into the UDA's youth wing Ulster Young Militants. McKeag then later became a born-again Christian and married young to a woman named Alison. His active interest in Christianity would diminish as he became more involved in the UDA, whilst his marriage also broke up. Along with Johnny Adair and other younger figures, McKeag helped to fill the power vacuum left in the UDA by the deaths of John McMichael and Jim Craig and the departures of Andy Tyrie and Tommy Lyttle.

== Killings ==
McKeag became involved in 'C' Company of the lower Shankill – the most active unit of the UDA – around 1989, heading his own section of the company which was a hit squad (other sections concentrating on drug-dealing, money laundering and similar activities). According to Henry McDonald and Jim Cusack, the UDA gave an annual "Volunteer of the Year" award to the organisation's top hitman. The award, presented on the Shankill Road and usually consisting of a trophy in the form of a model gun and plaque made by loyalists prisoners, was dominated by McKeag from 1990 onwards and helped to ensure that he became known as "Top Gun" both to his UDA comrades and his republican opponents. In all, the RUC estimated that McKeag was responsible for at least 12 killings of mostly innocent Catholic civilians, although the figure was placed higher by a number of his former paramilitary associates.

One of McKeag's earliest attacks occurred on 11 March 1990 when he shot and killed Eamon Quinn outside his Kashmir Road home in the Clonard district of the Falls Road, beginning a long campaign of sectarian killings by the UDA. On 31 July he was behind a similar attack on the Springfield Road, where Catholic John Judge was killed after being shot five times by McKeag and his unit. This was followed on 16 October by the killing of Dermot McGuinness in Rosapena Street in north Belfast. Another victim was Seamus Sullivan, the son of former Belfast City Council member Jim Sullivan of the Workers' Party, killed on 4 September 1991 at the council depot on Springfield Avenue where he worked. Lawrence Murchan, a shopkeeper who was killed by McKeag and his unit on St James's Road on 28 September was the 2000th person to be killed during The Troubles. This was followed on 22 December by an attack on the Devenish Arms in Finaghy, resulting in the death of civil servant Aidan Wallace and wounding an 8-year-old boy who lost an eye.

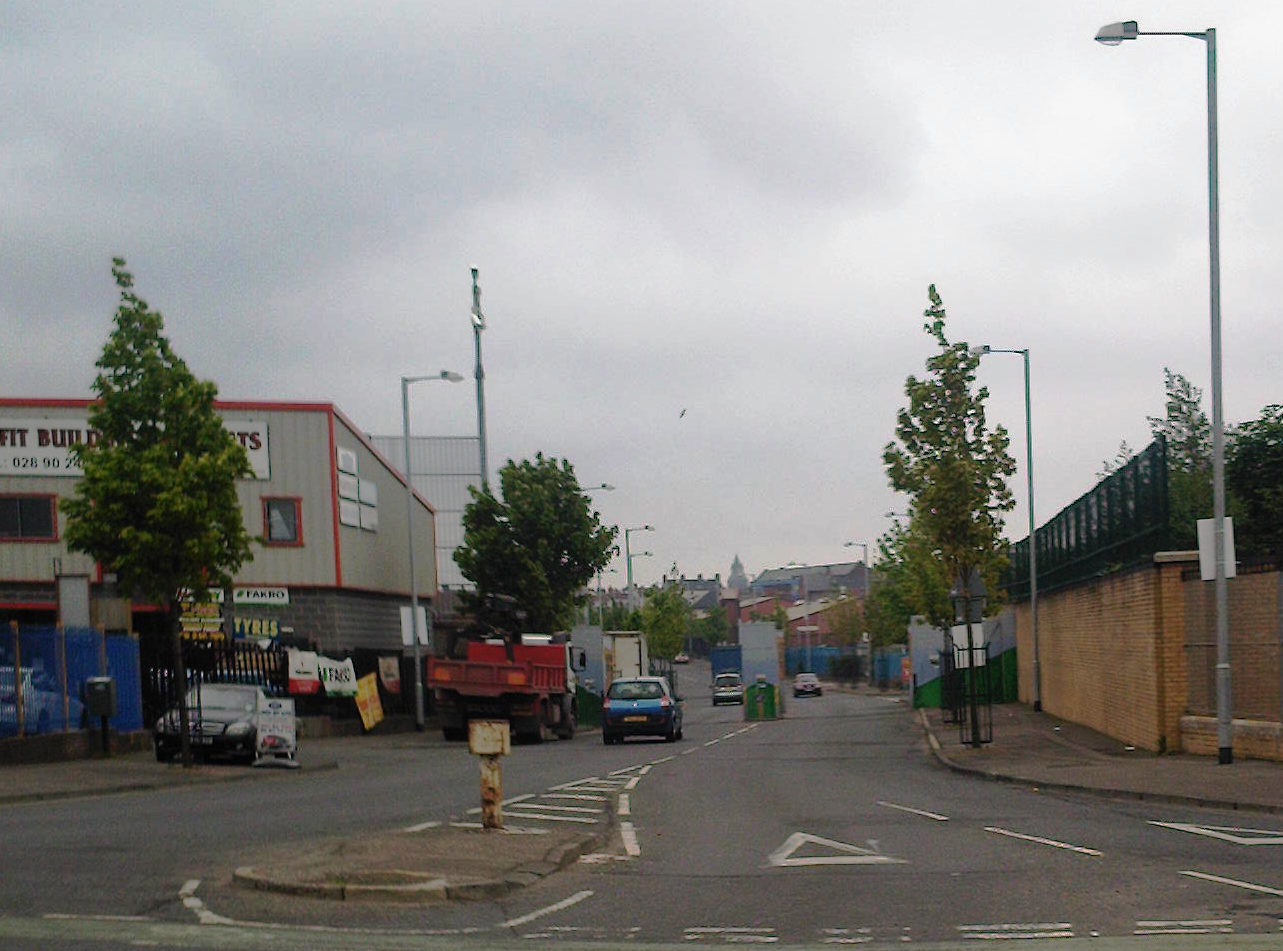
Lanark Way, known to McKeag as the "Yellow Brick Road"

Following his killing of Catholic shop worker Philomena Hanna at a chemists near the Springfield Road on 28 April 1992, eyewitnesses reported that as McKeag and his driver sped back to the Shankill via Lanark Way they shouted and sang his favourite song, 'Follow the Yellow Brick Road' from The Wizard of Oz. Other UDA members later confirmed that the Yellow Brick Road was McKeag's nickname for Lanark Way, a street linking the Shankill and Springfield roads and favoured by loyalist hitmen as an escape route from Republican West Belfast. An attack on 14 November 1992, launched by McKeag, under the orders of Johnny Adair, on a branch of Sean Graham's bookmakers on the Ormeau Road left three Catholics dead and a number of others, including some Protestants who also frequented the betting shop, injured.

As well as civilian Catholics, McKeag was also involved on attacks upon republicans. On 24 March 1993, Peter Gallagher, a 44 year old Sinn Féin member from Toomebridge, County Antrim was killed by McKeag when he arrived at his work at the Westlink Enterprise Centre, just off Distillery Street in West Belfast. Mr Gallagher was shot several times by a lone assassin which many now presume was McKeag. Mr Gallagher was a father to seven children and had recently become a grandfather before his death.

On 1 May 1993 Alan Lundy, a former Provisional IRA activist, was killed by McKeag at the home of Sinn Féin's councillor Alex Maskey, in the Andersonstown area. McKeag struck again on 8 August 1993, killing Sean Lavery at the Antrim Road home of his father Bobby Lavery, a Sinn Féin councillor who had been the target of the attack. However non-republicans continued to be targets and on 30 August he killed Marie Teresa Dowds de Mogollon in an attack on her home, although this murder was seen as extreme by UDA brigadiers outside C Company, resulting in it eventually being claimed as an accident when it was claimed under the UDA's Ulster Freedom Fighters cover name. This was followed on 7 September 1993 when McKeag and two other UDA members entered a hairdresser's shop on the upper Donegall Road and shot the proprietor Sean Hughes dead. Although brought to trial he was not convicted after eyewitness testimony did not stand up to scrutiny. The following day shopkeeper Michael Edwards was killed at his Finaghy home by McKeag and his unit and on 15 October McKeag killed Paddy McMahon after calling for him to deliver a pizza to a derelict house. McKeag was held in prison soon after this attack for the Hughes trial and the mantle of top hitman in C Company temporarily passed to Gary "Smickers" Smyth.

Following the killing of Loyalist Volunteer Force (LVF) leader Billy Wright by the Irish National Liberation Army (INLA) inside the Maze Prison in December 1997, Adair, who was a strong admirer of "King Rat", told McKeag that he had carte blanche to avenge the murder. McKeag did so on 28 December when he entered the Clifton Tavern in north Belfast and opened fire with an Uzi, killing Edmund Trainor and injuring a number of others. On 23 January 1998 he was also involved in the killing of Liam Conway on north Belfast's Hesketh Road, although McKeag was brought before the Inner Council of the UDA for this attack as the movement had declared a ceasefire a few hours earlier. McKeag claimed that the attack was in response to the continuing activity of the INLA, and his fearsome reputation meant that the Inner Council would not reprimand him, even though the murder resulted in the Ulster Democratic Party being excluded from all-party talks. By this time McKeag was effectively in command of C Company whilst Adair was in prison.

== Decline ==
In June 1998 McKeag, a keen motorcyclist, suffered serious injuries when a motorbike he was riding collided with a car being driven by a member of the Ulster Volunteer Force (UVF). He suffered a number of broken bones and required several operations, including the insertion of pins into his leg, and as a consequence he also developed an addiction to painkillers. He also had a collapsed lung and stomach damage and for a time had to wear a urostomy bag.

A celebrated figure within loyalism for his exploits, cracks began to show in 1999, notably at an event at the Royal Antediluvian Order of Buffaloes on the Corcrain estate in Portadown where McKeag was mobbed by fans from the Loyalist Volunteer Force (LVF) and on stage was applauded by all except his C Company comrades Adair and Gary "Smickers" Smyth. Smyth continued the resentment a few months later when, as McKeag received another "Volunteer of the Year" prize, he yelled "what about me" from the audience. With Adair in prison and Smyth in temporary command of C Company, McKeag fell out of favour and was soon ordered off the Shankill, ostensibly for becoming involved in fights between women at illegal UDA-run drinking dens on the Shankill.

When Adair returned to the Shankill in the summer of 2000 he brought McKeag back to use him for the loyalist feud he was planning against the UVF. McKeag however refused to take part and was severely beaten by Adair and his allies and cut off from organised loyalism altogether. Some within C Company, including William "Winkie" Dodds, felt that Adair had a long-term jealousy of McKeag's exploits as a killer and argued that Adair had based much of his own reputation for violence upon activities actually carried out by McKeag. It was also claimed in An Phoblacht, Sinn Féin's official newspaper, that McKeag had been involved in a £70,000 cocaine deal that he had excluded Adair from, although the allegation was not quoted elsewhere. One of McKeag's last violent actions was opening fire on police with an AK-47 during riots in response to the Drumcree conflict on Belfast's Carlisle Circus, a junction at the base of the Crumlin and Antrim Roads near the city centre.

== Personal life ==
Physically McKeag, like Johnny Adair, was shaven-headed, muscular and heavily tattooed and he wore a miniature golden gun around his neck on a thick gold chain. Maintaining a number of girlfriends simultaneously, McKeag fathered four children by four different women – two daughters both called Stephanie and two sons both called Stephen. In the case of one child, McKeag even delivered it himself after his Newtownards-based girlfriend broke her waters in his car, forcing him to pull into a petrol station to deliver the baby. One of McKeag's girlfriends was Jacqueline Newell who had previously been involved with Derek Adgey, a one-time member of the Royal Marines. Both Newell and Adgey were sentenced in 1995 for passing information about leading republicans including Brian Gillen and Alex Maskey to the UDA and it has been claimed that McKeag was their main point of contact with the organisation. McKeag was also dating Tracey Coulter, daughter of the UDA's Jackie Coulter, later murdered in a UDA/UVF feud.

Outside of his loyalist activities McKeag also had a reputation for having unusual hobbies. An animal lover, McKeag variously owned a Rottweiler dog, a parrot, an iguana, a scorpion, a snake and a collection of tropical fish, and had even attempted to purchase a monkey until his then live-in girlfriend prevented him from doing so. He had an extensive collection of electronic gadgets and mixed rave music tunes as a hobby. He was also known for the flashy Christmas decorations with which he festooned his house every December, including flashing lights and plastic reindeer on the roof.

== Death and aftermath ==
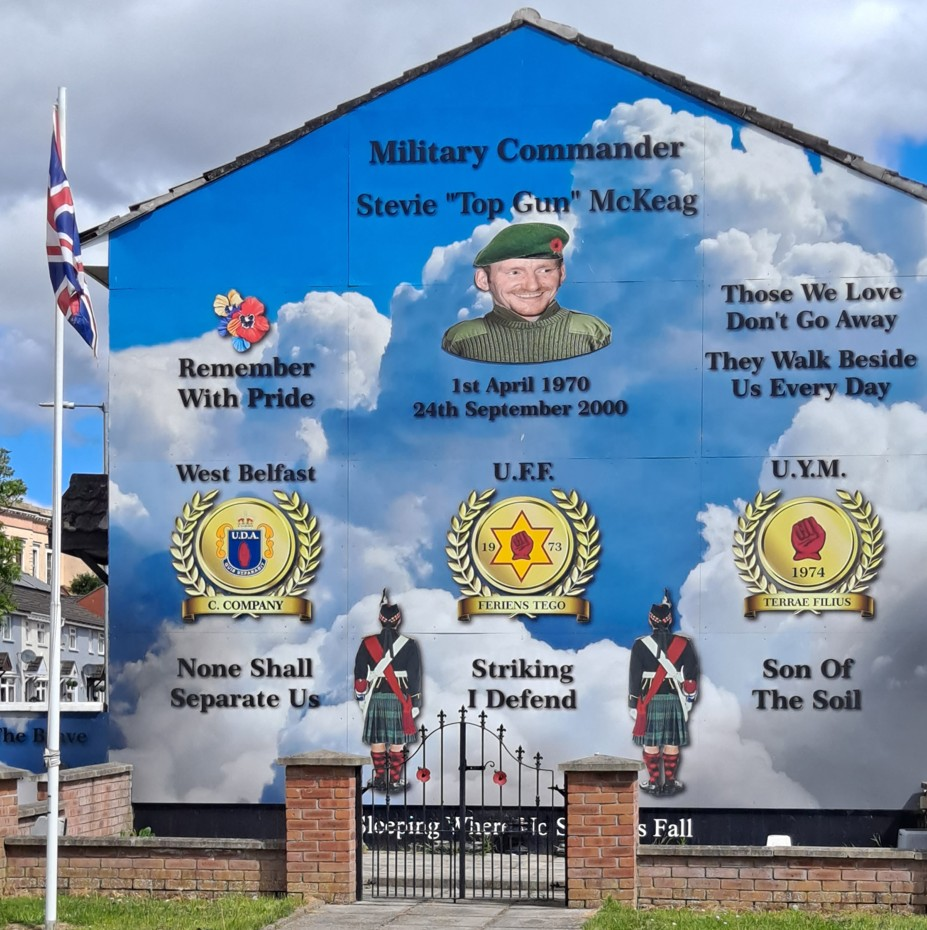
A mural dedicated to McKeag on Hopewell Crescent in Belfast

McKeag was found dead by family members at his home at Florence Court off the Crumlin Road on 24 September 2000. His face was heavily bruised and a crossbow bolt embedded into the wall nearby, and it was initially assumed that he had been killed; however a post-mortem found that his death was caused by a lethal combination of painkillers and cocaine. Some of his supporters continued to blame Adair, due to the love triangle which emerged between him and McKeag when Tracey Coulter started sleeping with Adair too. It was claimed that Adair's men had entered the house, attacked McKeag, who had fired the crossbow at them, and then forced quantities of cocaine down his throat to kill him. There was no evidence to support these claims.

McKeag was buried at Roselawn Cemetery in the east of the city in front of around 1,000 mourners, including Adair, Smyth and UVF/RHC representatives, with floral tributes sent by Ulster Young Militants and Combat 18. Although by this time he was estranged from the leadership of C Company, McKeag's litany of violence meant he retained his hero status with the younger members of the group and as a result a new mural was painted on the lower Shankill in commemoration of McKeag. It has been updated several times.

== Bibliography ==
- David Lister & Hugh Jordan, Mad Dog: The Rise and Fall of Johnny Adair and C Company, Edinburgh: Mainstream Publishing, 2004
- Henry McDonald & Jim Cusack, UDA – Inside the Heart of Loyalist Terror, Dublin: Penguin Ireland, 2004
