= Winkie Dodds =

Northern Irish paramilitary (born 1959)

- Born: William Dodds; 7 May 1959 (age 67); Belfast, Northern Ireland
- Spouse: Maureen Dodds
- Military career
- Allegiance: Ulster Freedom Fighters
- Rank: Brigadier
- Nicknames: Big Evil, Stinky Winkie
- Units: C Company, 2nd Battalion Shankill Road, West Belfast Brigade
- Conflict: The Troubles

William "Winkie" Dodds (born 7 May 1959) is a Northern Irish loyalist activist. He was a leading member of the West Belfast Brigade of the Ulster Defence Association (UDA) and for a number of years a close ally of Johnny Adair. Frequently serving as head of the West Belfast Brigade during Adair's spells in prison, Dodds later split from his old friend and is now no longer active in loyalist paramilitarism.

== Early years ==
Dodds and Adair first came into contact when Adair was 12 and Dodds was 16. Dodds would demand money from the younger boy as Adair went round the doors of the Shankill Road delivering copies of the Belfast Telegraph. The two soon became friends when Dodds began to hang around outside the Buffs Club with Adair and his gang. Like Adair, Dodds flirted with the white power skinhead scene and sometimes accompanied the others to skinhead discos in areas such as Rathcoole and Monkstown. In appearance Dodds was heavily built and had a tattoo of a pistol on his left arm.

== C Company commander ==
Dodds became active in the UDA before Adair and in the early 1980s he was given a six-year prison sentence for a post office robbery. Released in the summer of 1985 the 27-year-old Dodds was immediately given command of C8, one of numerous "teams" that made up C Company (the lower Shankill section of the West Belfast Brigade), and before long the man known as both "Big Evil" and "Stinky Winkie" was made military commander of C Company as a whole. Dodds took his old friends Adair and Mo Courtney under his wing and trained them in preparation for including them in murder squads. Before long Dodds had turned C Company into one of the UDA's most active murder units, ordering the killing of, amongst others, Francisco Notarantonio in October 1987. Dodds had chosen his name from a security forces list supplied to him by infiltrated Intelligence agent Brian Nelson. The killing of Terrence McDaid on 10 May 1988 was ordered by Dodds in similar circumstances, although in this case the wrong man was killed. Nelson had given Dodds the address and photograph. The address was incorrect, however and the actual target was McDaid's older brother Declan, the two brothers looking very much alike. Nelson criticised Dodds for this failure, who countered that the two were physically very similar in appearance.

Along with the commander of A Company Matt Kincaid, B Company commander Jim Spence and deputy brigadier Eric McKee, Dodds was one of a number of leading West Belfast UDA figures imprisoned as part of the Stevens Inquiries. With other leading figures like Nelson and West Belfast brigadier Tommy Lyttle also in prison, the initiative passed to Adair and other young members. As part of wider restructuring to take account of the sudden loss of leadership in West Belfast, Adair replaced Dodds as head of C Company.

== Return to action ==
Dodds was released soon afterwards and, although his place had now been firmly taken by Adair, the two remained good friends and Dodds continued in C Company. Along with Adair, Dodds was a target of the October 1993 Provisional IRA Shankill Road bombing as the two men had been seen by IRA Intelligence entering the UDA headquarters in the room above Frizzell's fish shop earlier that same day. Both had long since left by the time the bomb exploded however. By 1994 Dodds had also become close to Derek Adgey, a Royal Marine who provided details of republicans to Dodds that were then used by C Company, in particular their leading gunman Stephen McKeag. According to Royal Ulster Constabulary (RUC) notes, Dodds was often in the car when McKeag made his sorties on to the Falls Road. By this time Dodds was second in command of C Company to Donald Hodgen, Adair having become West Belfast brigadier.

== Brigadier ==
On 16 May 1994 Dodds was one of around twenty leading figures in C Company arrested as part of a police operation against the group. Dodds was released without charge but Adair was sent down and Dodds was chosen to serve as West Belfast brigadier during his incarceration. Dodds however continued to take his orders from Adair despite the latter's imprisonment. According to police intelligence files Dodds operated a large-scale drug-dealing operation as part of his brigadiership. Dodds also helped to organise Adair's prison wedding in February 1997 as Dodds' wife Maureen was a close friend of Gina Crossan, Adair's long-time partner whom he married inside the Maze.

The Combined Loyalist Military Command (CLMC) had declared its ceasefire soon after Adair's imprisonment, meaning that the brigade was supposed to be significantly less active. Stephen McKeag however largely ignored the ceasefire and continued killing until Dodds brought him into UDA headquarters and demanded an explanation. Quoting from the text of the original ceasefire statement, McKeag insisted he was simply reacting to republican violence and refused to stop. The two remained close however and in May 1999 they accompanied Adair, who had been given a temporary parole, to Glasgow to attend a loyalist dinner. Following Adair's full-time release in September 1999 Dodds stepped aside so as Adair could once again take on the role of brigadier.

== Adair's ally ==
Dodds remained a leading figure in West Belfast and was still a close comrade of Adair. On 10 December 1999 he was part of a five-man team, along with Adair, John White and brigadiers Jackie McDonald and John Gregg to meet General John de Chastelain, chairman of the Independent International Commission on Decommissioning. Around this time Adair moved into Boundary Way on an estate in the lower Shankill known locally as "Beirut", becoming Dodds' next door neighbour. The two continued to be close and often travelled to Mid-Ulster together to attend Loyalist Volunteer Force (LVF) events, with Adair keen to develop close links with the LVF.

Adair initiated a loyalist feud with the Ulster Volunteer Force (UVF) on 19 August 2000 and Dodds took a leading role in the brief but bloody conflict that followed, relaying orders to A Company in Highfield that the estate should be "cleansed" of UVF members. However Adair was arrested on 22 August 2000 whilst he and Dodds were driving down the Shankill Road. With command reverting to Dodds UVF member Samuel Rockett was shot and killed at his home by C Company the following night. The feud came to an uneasy truce soon afterwards.

== Split ==
Dodds' role in the UDA was significantly scaled back in early 2002 when he suffered a stroke. The stroke forced him to stand down from the role of West Belfast brigadier which he once again occupied in Adair's absence. Meanwhile, Adair was released again in 2002 and soon took to feuding with other UDA brigadiers, resulting in his expulsion from the movement in September. Adair attempted to resist but soon his actions took on a paranoid dimension that eventually led to a split between Dodds and him. Adair heard that Dodds' cousin William "Muggsy" Mullan had been drug-dealing with the Shoukri brothers, Adair's rivals in North Belfast, and so Adair ordered Mullan to pay him a £10,000 fine or leave Northern Ireland. Mullan's family scraped together £7000 which Dodds took to Adair but he refused to accept it and Mullan was forced to flee. Winkie's brother Milton "Doddsy" Dodds met some Adair's men in a bar and asked them why the brigadier had treated his brother so badly but Donald Hodgen punched him and later that night Adair's ally Fat Jackie Thompson led a punishment squad to Doddsy's house where he was beaten with baseball bats. The following day Winkie Dodds decided he had had enough of Adair's erratic behaviour and he and his wife left the Shankill altogether to set up home in the White City estate near Newtownabbey where John Gregg, by then an enemy of Adair, agreed to place the family under the protection of his South East Antrim Brigade. Gregg's political adviser Tommy Kirkham helped Dodds and his family move into the area, claiming "they didn't feel they could stay there any longer". In response Dodds being driven off the Shankill Mo Courtney, another old friend of both Dodds and Adair, began to conspire with the mainstream UDA against Adair. When Gregg was subsequently killed by Adair's allies Dodds attended the funeral.

Following the actions by Jackie Thompson that forced Adair's supporters off the Shankill Road Dodds and his wife returned to live in the area. By this time Dodds was forced to walk with a stick and had difficulty speaking due to his stroke. Nonetheless, when asked his opinion of Adair soon after returning to the Shankill Dodds stated of his former friend "he's a fucking wanker".

Other offices
Preceded by Johnny Adair	Ulster Defence Association West Belfast Brigadier; 1995–1999	Succeeded by Johnny Adair
Preceded by Johnny Adair	Ulster Defence Association West Belfast Brigadier; 2000–2002	Succeeded by Johnny Adair
