= UDA South East Antrim Brigade =

Paramilitary gang of Northern Island

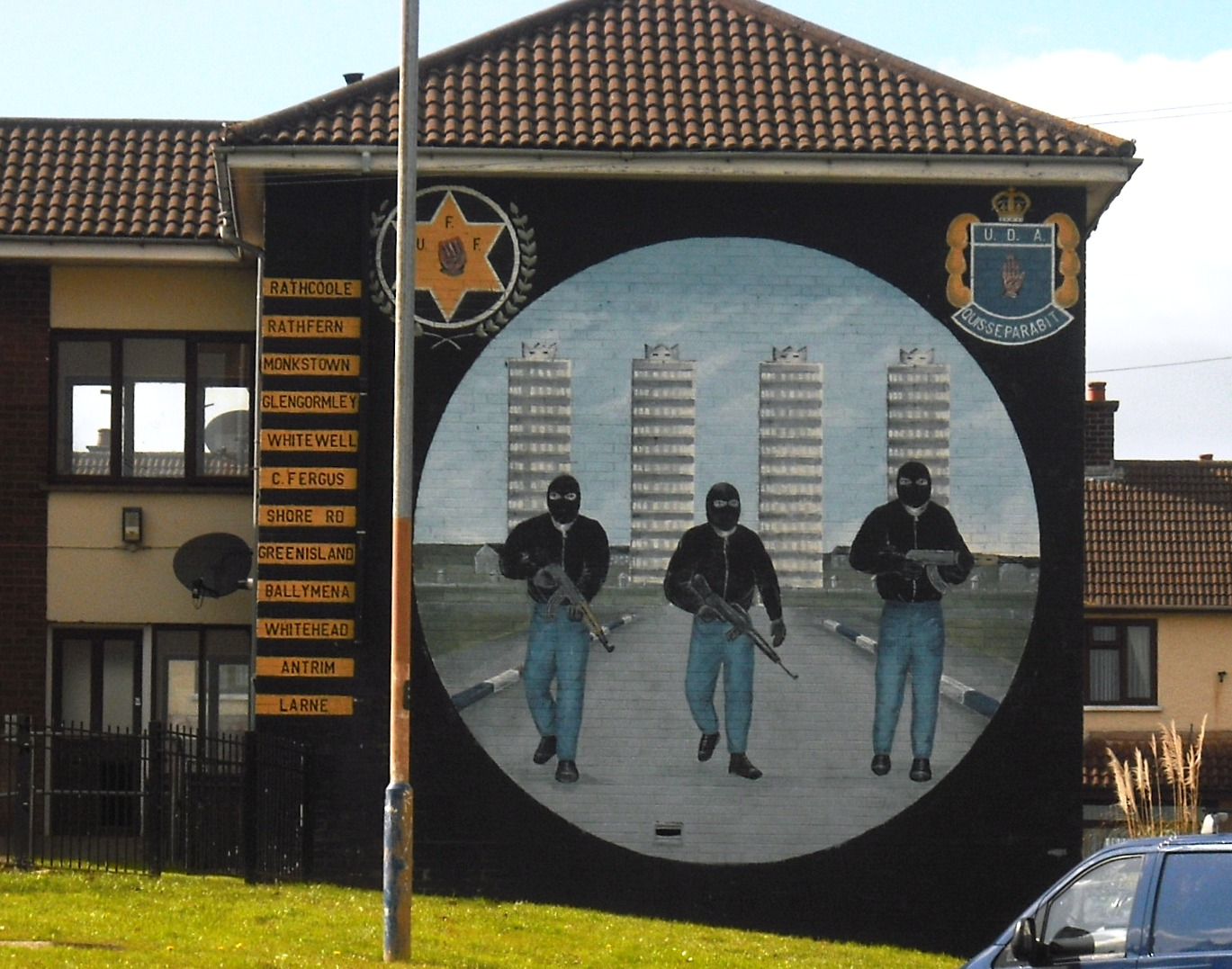
Mural in Rathcoole, Newtownabbey showing the areas covered by the brigade, the mural was later replaced with a mural of Queen Elizabeth II

The UDA South East Antrim Brigade was previously one of the six brigades of the Ulster Defence Association (UDA) and are heavily involved in the drug trade. It is claimed they control "100%" of an illegal drugs network in south-east County Antrim, Northern Ireland. A mural in support of the group lists its areas of activity as being Rathcoole (the mural's location), Rathfern, Monkstown, Glengormley and Whitewell, all of which are part of Newtownabbey, as well as Carrickfergus, the Shore Road, Greenisland, Ballymena, Whitehead, Antrim and Larne. A newer mural in the Cloughfern area of Newtownabbey and flags have updated the areas to include Ballycarry, Ballyclare, the rural hinterland of Ballymena called 'Braidside' and despite not being in County Antrim, the town of Newtownards. The Guardian has identified it as "one of the most dangerous factions". The Irish News described the brigade as 'powerful' and at one time being 'the most bloody and murderous gang operating within the paramilitary organisation'. Since 2007 the South East Antrim Brigade has operated independently of the UDA following a fall-out.

== Emergence under Alan Snoddy ==
It is unclear when South East Antrim (SEA) was first designated as a brigade area although its first recognised leader was Alan Snoddy and he held the title of Brigadier by at least 1979. Snoddy was close to UDA leader Andy Tyrie and was recognised as one of his closest allies amongst the UDA leadership.

Amongst the Brigade's most notorious attacks during the Troubles was the attempted killing of Sinn Féin president Gerry Adams in 1984. Adams was in a taxi near Belfast City Hall with some associates when another car containing John 'Grug' Gregg and two fellow Rathcoole UDA members pulled up alongside and opened fire on Adams. Adams was hit five times in the attack but the taxi rushed to the Royal Victoria Hospital where he received treatment and survived. Gregg, Colin Gray and Gerry Welsh were immediately arrested by the waiting British Army, who had doctored the bullets to reduce their lethality. They were convicted for the attack the following year. The attack is commemorated in the song South East Antrim Brigade by loyalist singer Rab C, many of whose compositions were about the brigade and its leading members.

In the later 1980s Snoddy took ill with cancer and many of his duties as brigadier were filled by his ally Joe English. Snoddy died from the illness in September 1988 and English immediately succeeded him.

== Towards ceasefire under Joe English ==
As brigadier Joe English enjoyed, theoretically, more power than his predecessor, as Andy Tyrie had been removed from the UDA leadership and replaced by a collective leadership of the movement's six brigadiers, including English. As the oldest member, English usually chaired the meetings of this Inner Council, although he often struggled to control UDA West Belfast Brigade brigadier Johnny Adair. The two clashed frequently and, in 1993, Adair even threatened to kill English after English had suggested that the UDA should not claim the murder of Marie Teresa Dowds de Mogollon, which Adair's top hitman Stephen McKeag had perpetrated. Later in the year, English was forced to confront Adair about rumours that Adair was considering attending an Inner Council meeting armed in order to eliminate the other five brigadiers and assume sole control of the UDA. English was a strong advocate of political means and pushed for the UDA to call a ceasefire in the early 1990s, a position that was anathema, at that point, to Adair.

== John Gregg as Brigadier ==
Gregg was released from prison in 1993. His assassination attempt had made him a loyalist hero and he quickly took over from English as brigadier. According to the Workers' Party, English was stood down by the UDA after he had expressed willingness to enter into dialogue with them. English would soon re-emerge as part of the Ulster Democratic Party. Under Gregg, drug-dealing became a major problem in brigade areas, particularly Rathcoole, with Gregg himself said to have a leading role in the illicit trade. In late August 1997, the brigade became involved in simmering tensions with fellow loyalist paramilitaries in the Ulster Volunteer Force (UVF). Cloughfern Young Conquerors, a flute band attached to the brigade, had been to Derry for the annual Apprentice Boys of Derry march through the city centre when at the train station they met members of the Shankill Protestant Boys, a UVF-affiliated band. Brawls between the two had been frequent and tensions had been growing between the UDA and UVF, leading to a drink-fuelled pitched battle between the two groups at the train station. During the course of the melee a Shankill Protestant Boys member managed to gouge out Gregg's eye.

Although the UDA was officially on ceasefire, the South East Antrim Brigade remained active in late 1998 and early 1999, undertaking a series of pipe bomb attacks on Catholic properties. These were carried out under the Red Hand Defenders cover name, with some attacks also blamed on the Orange Volunteers who were active in similar attacks at the time. Gregg, who was noted for his sectarian beliefs, insisted that such attacks were necessary in order to prevent the "greening" of places such as Carrickfergus and Antrim, a process he claimed had already happened in Glengormley where the Catholic population had experienced significant growth. Around this time Gregg spearheaded an initiative to significantly increase recruitment into the South East Antrim Brigade. He told author Ian S. Wood that he had only supported the Combined Loyalist Military Command ceasefire in an effort to ensure the release of imprisoned friends. In 2000, he helped to ensure that a proposal before the Inner Council to initiate the decommissioning of weapons was rejected. Trevor Lowry (aged 49) was beaten to death in Glengormley by UDA members under Gregg's command on 11 April 2001 after he was mistaken for a Catholic.

Gregg was not close to Johnny Adair but sympathised with his uncompromising attitudes and his anti-UVF views. Under Gregg, the South East Antrim Brigade was linked to the killing of UVF member Mark Quail during Adair's feud with the UVF in 2000 although according to the BBC the killing was not directly connected to Adair's issues with the UVF but rather stemmed from a pub dispute in north Belfast between members of the two paramilitary groups.

However, in late 2002 a UDA member originally from the Woodvale Road who had moved to Rathcoole was attacked after it emerged that he was a friend of Joe English, the former brigadier who had since been exiled from the area by Gregg for his anti-drugs stance. In response, three Woodvale UDA members went to Gregg and complained about the attack in a move Gregg saw as a threat. He complained to senior figures in West Belfast before ordering that the three men be kneecapped. The shootings raised some anger on the Shankill, where the three were well-liked figures, and Adair sought to exploit this as a method of getting rid of Gregg. He sought to portray Gregg as unstable and thuggish and spread a rumour that he was about to be replaced as brigadier. This briefly occurred in late August when one of Adair's allies took command of the brigade, although this proved short-lived. Gregg was back in command by October, at which point he was one of the brigadiers who passed the resolution expelling Adair from the UDA for his involvement in the attempted murder of Jim Gray.

On 8 December, a bomb was found under Gregg's car, apparently placed there by one of Adair's allies from the Loyalist Volunteer Force. This was followed by two pipe bombs being thrown at Gregg's house and shots being fired at that of his friend Tommy Kirkham. A bomb attack on Adair's house on 8 January 2003 was blamed on Gregg by John White. Adair was returned to prison two days later. Members of Adair's C Company shot and killed Gregg the following month. His deputy Rab Carson was killed in the same attack, with both men having just returned from Scotland where they were attending a Rangers F.C. match. Adair would be removed from his position of power soon afterwards in a show of strength by the mainstream UDA under the command of Jackie McDonald.

== Under Gary Fisher ==
Gary Fisher, a close associate of Tommy Kirkham, succeeded Gregg as brigadier. Under Fisher, the South East Antrim Brigade became close to the Shoukri brothers, who commanded the neighbouring North Belfast Brigade before being expelled from the UDA in June 2006. In a move that was not universally popular in the region, Fisher allowed the Shoukris and their ally Alan McClean to live under South East Antrim Brigade protection and even attend meetings of the brigade's commanders. In response to the criticism from the rest of the UDA leadership, Fisher withdrew the South East Antrim brigade from the UDA and reconstituted it as a separate movement.

In 2007, the UDA's inner council expelled the Brigadier in the South East Antrim area and his political adviser after a long-running stand-off between the mainstream UDA and the South East Antrim Brigade. The council released a statement expelling two figures within it, believed to be senior UDA figures Fisher and Kirkham, once a member of the Ulster Political Research Group (UPRG), although they were not named. This came within a few days of a £1m allocation to a conflict transformation project in loyalist areas. The Belfast Telegraph called the move "a familiar loyalist pattern of events." The dissident branch was also revealed to have contained an informer after Jon McDowell, Tommy Kirkham's assistant, told the Belfast Telegraph that he was an RUC Special Branch agent in November 2007. A new interim leadership was appointed in their stead although the brigade effectively divided between those who supported the wider UDA leadership and those who remained loyal to Fisher. As of 2014, the South East Antrim Brigade is no longer considered part of the wider UDA and their brigadier does not attend meetings of the organisation's ruling Inner Council.

In 2009, the brigade claimed to have decommissioned a substantial quantity of guns and explosives in a single day in the presence of the chairman of the Independent International Commission on Decommissioning (IICD). The brigade representatives refused to give any details about how many weapons or how much commercial explosives were destroyed during the day-long exercise. On 8 February 2010, British Prime Minister Gordon Brown announced that the Brigade had completed decommissioning. The process was confirmed as complete by the IICD and came in the last 24 hours of the commission's existence. The decommissioning was completed at the same time as that of the republican Irish National Liberation Army (INLA) and Official Irish Republican Army (OIRA). Accusations that the brigade has remained active continued, however, and in 2009, the mother of Jason Ballard, a 20-year-old Greenisland native subjected to a vicious beating at his home, claimed that the attack had been carried out by the South East Antrim Brigade, although they denied any involvement in the attack. In 2010, the Independent Monitoring Commission confirmed that the split between the Fisher faction of the brigade and the wider UDA had not ended. As of 2014 Fisher was still identified by the Irish Independent as Brigadier, with the brigade reported as being in the process of rearming.

In March 2014 the South East Antrim Brigade was widely reported as being behind a "rampage" in which up to 100 people, some of them wearing masks, attacked a number of residential properties in Larne. A Police Service of Northern Ireland officer was injured during the disturbance. Assistant Chief Constable George Hamilton described the incident as a "power trip" by the brigade, and suggested that it was an attempt by the group to assert their dominance over the local community. The targets of the attack were reported locally as being two brothers who had been involved in a scuffle with three UDA members the night before. Both men, who lived on Ferris Avenue, had their houses burnt out during the attack. Three arrests were made in the days immediately after the attack.

On 13 March 2017 Geordie Gilmore, formerly a commander in the brigade until being stood down in 2016 following a dispute over drug money, was shot in the neck in Carrickfergus. Gilmore died the following day, with the incident described as part of an ongoing feud in the town. Two men were subsequently charged with the murder. Gilmore had been targeted in an unsuccessful crossbow attack the previous August. The South-east Antrim brigadier, who was not named in reports, stated that any brigade members attending Gilmore's funeral would be expelled.

On 29 May 2017 Colin Horner, a friend of Gilmore and former UDA member, was fatally shot in front of his three-year-old son at a busy shopping centre in Bangor, County Down. Police confirmed that they were treating it as part of the existing feud. Horner's friend, Carrickfergus loyalist Geordie Gilmore, had been killed during the feud two months earlier. Two men from the Newtownards area were arrested in connection with the killing. Fisher was subsequently identified by the Sunday Life as brigadier, with the paper accusing him of ordering the shooting of Horner. On 16 January 2019 four men were jailed for life for their involvement in the murder.

On 11 December 2018 handguns bought on the 'dark net' by two Co Antrim men linked to a loyalist feud may have been destined for use by the South East Antrim UDA.

On 3 January 2019 police reported a baby in a pram narrowly escaped injury after homes were attacked in Co Down by South East Antrim UDA members.

On 4 January 2019 police investigated SEA UDA graffiti sprayed on eleven properties.

=== Threats against journalists and politicians ===
On 8 May 2020 a number of journalists working for the Sunday Life and Sunday World newspapers were warned by the PSNI about imminent attacks against journalists by the South East Antrim UDA. At least one journalist was warned of a possible under car booby trap.

The threats were condemned by Peter Vandermeersch of Independent News & Media and Seamus Dooley, assistant General Secretary of the National Union of Journalists, and by Amnesty International UK. Patsy McGlone, Stephen Farry, Steve Aiken and Doug Beattie also condemned the attacks and were subsequently warned by the PSNI of threats from the South East Antrim UDA.

According to the Irish Times there are suspicions that the threats are in response to coverage of the murder of Glenn Quinn in Carrickfergus in January 2020.

On 25 November 2020 the Belfast Telegraph reported that the South East Antrim UDA had passed on a threat against one of their journalists.

In July 2021, Doug Beattie, the leader of the Ulster Unionist Party, told the BBC that the South East Antrim UDA had threatened to kill him twice.

South East Antrim UDA, now under the name "Real UFF" (not to be confused with the dissident group RUFF) issued threats to loyalist Jamie Bryson.

In July 2024, the Irish Independent reported that the South East Antrim UDA had made death threats against a Mediahuis journalist and this was being investigated by the PSNI

== Brigadiers ==
1979: Alan Snoddy
1988: Joe English
1993: John Gregg
2003: Gary Fisher
