= Martin Lynch (Irish republican) =

Member of the Provisional Irish Republican Army

Martin Lynch is a native of Belfast, Northern Ireland and was reportedly a member of the Provisional Irish Republican Army (IRA) Army Council. Lynch is alleged to have been the adjutant-general, who had day-to-day control of the IRA. He is a former driver of Gerry Adams and Martin McGuinness, and is considered an Adams loyalist. He was also the Sinn Féin Northern chair.

In 1992 he was convicted on weapons possession charges and sentenced to 10 years imprisonment for having an armalite rifle, a rocket launcher, a Colt pistol and ammunition.

In 1999 a car used by Lynch, which took Adams and McGuinness to meetings with the Provisional Irish Republican Army, was found to contain an MI5 bugging device. Mo Mowlam had personally sanctioned the listening and tracking device found in the vehicle, as she later confirmed in a television interview. MI5 later briefed the Sunday Times that the £20,000 device had also been intended to help locate IRA weaponry. The target of the surveillance was Lynch, whose unsuspecting wife owned the car. Adams tacitly confirmed the vehicle's status as IRA transport when he stated that it was used by both McGuinness, Sinn Féin's chief negotiator, and himself when they travelled to meetings with the IRA. He accused the British of endangering the peace process, describing the affair as "an outrageous breach of faith which must be addressed at the highest levels".
