= Brian Gillen =

Irish Republican Army member

Brian "Ginger" Gillen (born 1956/1957) was alleged to be a volunteer in the Belfast Brigade of the Provisional Irish Republican Army, and, later, named to the IRA Army Council. His solicitor was Pat Finucane, who was shot dead by loyalists in 1989.

In 1995 Gillen, as Officer Commanding of the IRA's Belfast Brigade, was a member of the IRA Executive and was critical of the strategy employed by Gerry Adams. In 1997, he was elected to the Army Council with the backing of Adams, after he backed the leadership over dissident republicans who wished to steer the IRA in a more hardline direction.

In 2000, Gillen, along with Adams, Martin McGuinness, Pat Doherty and Brian Keenan were issued with a subpoena, in order to appear at Northern Ireland High Court as part of a civil action which was taken by relatives of the 29 Omagh bombing victims.
