= Kneecapping =

Form of punitive injury to the knee

Kneecapping is a form of malicious wounding, in which the victim is injured in the knee, often as torture. The injury is typically inflicted by a low-velocity gunshot to the back of the knee (popliteal fossa) with a handgun. The term is considered a misnomer by medical professionals, because only a very small minority of victims suffer damage to the kneecap. A review of eighty kneecapping victims found that only two had a fractured kneecap. Some victims have their elbows and ankles shot as well.

== History ==
During the Troubles in Northern Ireland, paramilitaries considered themselves to be law enforcers in their own areas. They used limb shootings to 'punish' alleged "political" and "normal" criminals. The Irish Republican Army defined "political" crime as informing or fraternizing with British soldiers, while "normal" crime was judged to include vandalism, theft, joyriding, rape, selling drugs, and antisocial behaviour. If the crime was considered to be grave, the victim was also shot in the ankles and elbows, leaving them with six gunshot wounds (colloquially known as a six pack). Approximately 2,500 people were victims of these paramilitary attacks, known as "punishment shootings" at the time, through the duration of the conflict. Those who were attacked often faced social stigma.

The Red Brigades, an Italian Marxist terrorist group, employed limb shootings (gambizzazioni) to warn their opponents. They used the method to punish at least 75 people up to December 1978.

The Bangladesh Police employed kneecapping from 2013 to punish the opposition and prevent them from participating in protests against the government. Human Rights Watch condemned the tactic in a report, which compared it to the usage by the Irish Republican Army, and called on the authorities to "order prompt, impartial, and independent investigations" into the allegations.

Hamas kneecapped, beat, and tortured scores of Palestinians in the Gaza Strip after the 2008–2009 Gaza War, who were accused of collaborating with Israel by the militia group. Amnesty International published a report on kneecapping in Gaza and called on Hamas to end "the campaign of abuses", and for an "independent, impartial and nonpartisan national commission of experts to investigate." Human Rights Watch also condemned the attacks in a report, which documented nearly 50 cases of the tactic, based on the testimony of local human rights groups. The report noted one Palestinian who escaped to Egypt for medical care was shot for supporting the Israeli attacks and thereafter used a wheelchair. Others were shot for criticising Hamas, leading the report author to state the brutality mocks the claims that Hamas is providing law and order. Columnist Richard Cohen wrote in an op-ed that the attacks would harm the Israeli–Palestinian peace process. Hamas again kneecapped and executed Palestinians who they accused of stealing food and aid supplies during the Gaza war in 2024. The group published videos of their actions, including one where they use a metal bar to break the knees of a blindfolded man.

== Treatment ==
The severity of the injury can vary from simple soft tissue damage to a knee joint fracture with neurovascular damage. The latter requires several weeks in hospital and intensive outpatient physiotherapy for recovery. If the damage is too great, amputation may be necessary, but this rarely occurs. In Northern Ireland thirteen people had their legs amputated as a consequence of limb punishment shootings over the duration of the Troubles. In the long term, it is estimated that one out of five victims will walk with a limp for the rest of their lives.

== See also ==
- Hamstringing
- Tarring and feathering

== General sources ==
- "Gaza: Hamas kneecappings, punishment beatings and killings of 'collaborators' revealed in new Amnesty report". Amnesty International UK. 10 February 2009.
- "Hamas' deadly campaign in the shadow of the war in Gaza". Amnesty International Ireland. February 2009. Archived from the original on 3 July 2015.
- Barr, R. J.; Mollan, R. A. B. (1989). "The orthopaedic consequences of civil disturbance in Northern Ireland" (PDF). The Journal of Bone and Joint Surgery. 71 (5): 739–744. doi:10.1302/0301-620X.71B5.2584241. PMID 2584241. Archived (PDF) from the original on 6 January 2014.
- Conroy, John (1980). "Kneecapping". Alicia Patterson Foundation. Archived from the original on 8 January 2014.
- Graham, L. E.; Parke, R. C. (2004). "The Northern Ireland Troubles and limb loss: a retrospective study". Prosthetics and Orthotics International. 28 (3): 225–229. doi:10.3109/03093640409167754. PMID 15658635. S2CID 6061030.
- Orsini, Alessandro (2011). Anatomy of the Red Brigades: The Religious Mind-set of Modern Terrorists. Translated from Italian by Sarah J. Nodes. Cornell University Press. ISBN 978-0-8014-6139-2.
- Williams, John (1997). "Casualties of Violence in Northern Ireland". International Journal of Trauma Nursing. 3 (3): 78–82. doi:10.1016/s1075-4210(97)90033-x. PMID 9295579.
