= John Gregg (loyalist) =

Northern Irish loyalist (1957–2003)

- John "Grugg" Gregg in 1990
- Born: John Gregg; 1957
- Died: 1 February 2003 (aged 45–46); Belfast, Northern Ireland
- Burial place: Carnmoney Cemetery
- Military career
- Allegiance: Ulster Defence Association
- Branch: UDA South East Antrim Brigade
- Service years: 1971–2003
- Rank: Brigadier
- Nicknames: "Grugg", "The Reaper"
- Conflict: The Troubles

John Gregg (1957 – 1 February 2003) was a Northern Irish loyalist who was a senior member of the UDA/UFF loyalist paramilitary organisation. In 1984, Gregg seriously wounded Sinn Féin president Gerry Adams in an assassination attempt. From the 1990s until he was shot dead in 2003 by rival associates, Gregg served as brigadier of the UDA's South East Antrim Brigade. Widely known as a man with a fearsome reputation, Gregg was considered a "hawk" in some loyalist circles.

== Early life ==
Gregg was born in 1957 and raised in a Protestant family from the Tigers Bay area of North Belfast. Gregg when explaining his family background, revealed that his father, regarded as a quiet man, had trust in the Royal Ulster Constabulary (RUC) and British Army but joined the loyalist vigilante groups set up around the start of the Troubles ostensibly to protect the Protestant community from attacks by republicans. His own earliest memory of the Troubles was the Northern Ireland Civil Rights Association marches in Derry, a movement to which Gregg and his family were strongly opposed.

== Ulster Defence Association ==
Gregg joined the Ulster Young Militants (UYM), the youth wing of the loyalist paramilitary Ulster Defence Association (UDA) at the age of 14. He spent six months in jail for rioting in 1977. He later became part of the UDA South East Antrim Brigade. Members of this brigade were believed to be behind the killings of Catholic postman Danny McColgan, Protestant teenager Gavin Brett and Trevor Lowry (the latter kicked to death in the mistaken belief he was a Catholic), and a spate of pipe bomb attacks on the homes of Catholics.

== Assassination attempt on Gerry Adams ==
On 14 March 1984, he severely wounded Sinn Féin president Gerry Adams in an attack supposedly ordered as a response to the earlier killings of Ulster Unionist Party politicians Robert Bradford and Edgar Graham. Gregg, at the time the head of the UDA group in Rathcoole, was in charge of a three-man hit team that pulled up alongside Adams' car near Belfast City Hall and opened fire injuring Adams and his three fellow passengers, who nonetheless escaped to seek treatment at the Royal Victoria Hospital, Belfast.

Gregg and his team were apprehended almost immediately by a British Army patrol that opened fire on them before ramming their car. The attack had been known in advance by security forces due to a tip-off from informants within Rathcoole; Adams and his co-passengers had survived in part because Royal Ulster Constabulary officers, acting on the informants' information, had replaced much of the ammunition in the UDA's Rathcoole weapons dump with low-velocity bullets.

Gregg was sentenced to 18 years in prison; however, he only served nine years before he was released in 1993. When asked by the BBC in prison if he regretted anything about the shooting, his reply was, "Only that I didn't succeed."

== Brigadier ==
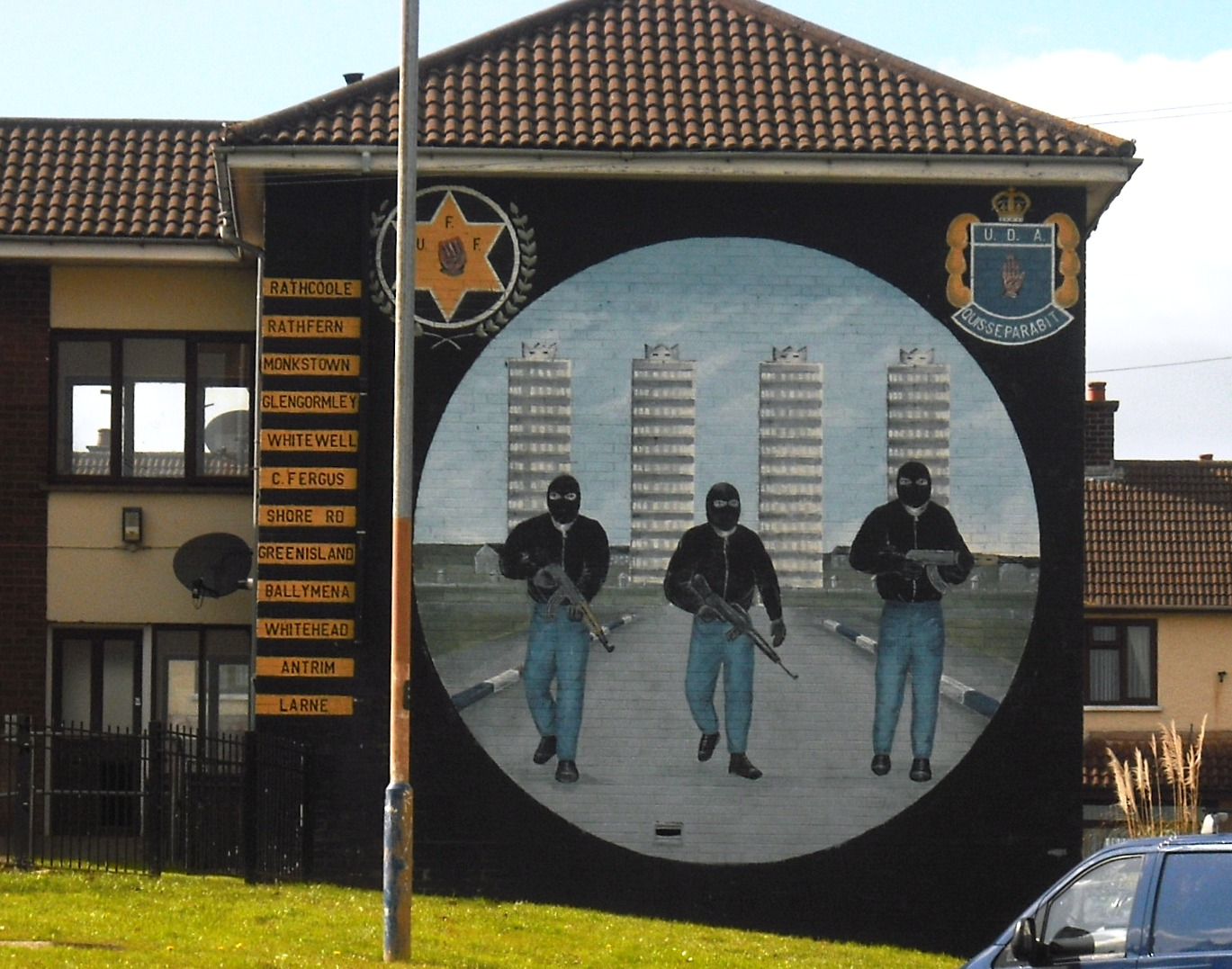
UDA mural in Gregg's Rathcoole stronghold

Following his release from prison, Gregg returned to Rathcoole, where he again became an important figure, taking a central role in the illegal drug trade, with his Rathcoole stronghold a centre of narcotics. Sometime after the Combined Loyalist Military Command of 1994 he succeeded Joe English, who had emerged as a leading figure in the Ulster Democratic Party, as so-called brigadier of the South-East Antrim UDA. Under Gregg the South-East Antrim Brigade were prepared to ignore the terms of the loyalist ceasefire, such as on 25 April 1997 when he dispatched a five-man team to Carrickfergus to set fire to a Catholic church in retaliation for a similar attack on a Protestant church in East Belfast (this earlier attack had actually been organised by dissident loyalists seeking to provoke the UDA into returning to violence). Gregg's fearsome reputation earned him the nickname "the Reaper" and he bore a tattoo of the Grim Reaper on his back as a tribute.

Gregg played the bass drum in the UDA-affiliated flute band Cloughfern Young Conquerors, a loyalist flute band which police claimed regularly caused trouble at Orange Order parades. In late August 1997 this band was one of a number of similar flute bands to travel to Derry for the annual Apprentice Boys of Derry march through the city centre. As the band prepared to take the train home that evening they met members of the Shankill Protestant Boys, another band in town for the parade that was affiliated to the Ulster Volunteer Force (UVF). Brawls between the two had been frequent and tensions had been growing between the UDA and UVF leading to a drink-fuelled pitched battle between the two groups at the train station. During the course of the melee a Shankill Protestant Boys member managed to gouge out Gregg's eye, although it is also claimed that Gregg lost his eye due to a fight with republicans at the same parade.

== Anti-Catholic campaigns ==
Along with Jackie McDonald and Billy McFarland, fellow brigadiers on the UDA's Inner Council, Gregg was lacking in enthusiasm for the Good Friday Agreement when it appeared in 1998. Throughout 1999 his brigade continued to be active, undertaking a pipe bomb campaign against Catholic homes whilst on 12 May members of his brigade shot and wounded a Catholic builder in Carrickfergus under the cover name "Protestant Liberation Force". Much of this activity was inspired by Gregg's personal hatred of Catholics. A senior police source once described him as a man driven by "pure and absolute bigotry". Gregg was also characterised as "a bully, a racketeer, and a sectarian bigot who took particular delight in carrying out vicious punishment attacks and randomly targeting Roman Catholics." In 2000 he helped to ensure that a proposal before the Inner Council to initiate the decommissioning of weapons was rejected.

Having witnessed demographic shifts in Glengormley and Crumlin, traditionally loyalist majority towns that had come to have nationalist majorities on account of loyalists moving out of Belfast, he determined that the same thing would not happen in Carrickfergus and Larne and so launched a campaign of pipe bomb and arson attacks on Catholic homes there (despite these towns having very small Catholic populations). The main target proved to be Danny O'Connor, a Social Democratic and Labour Party (SDLP) representative on initially Larne Borough Council and then the Northern Ireland Assembly, whose home and office were attacked at least 12 times by Gregg's men between 2000 and 2002. Protestant Trevor Lowry (aged 49) was beaten to death in Glengormley by UDA members under Gregg's command on 11 April 2001 after he was mistaken for a Catholic. Catholic workman Gary Moore was killed in Monkstown in 2000 in another killing attributed to Gregg's unit.

In 2001, Gregg's reign of terror in Rathcoole, where drug dealing, knee-capping and savage beatings were the norm, was challenged by local British Labour Party Councillor Mark Langhammer, who also objected to Gregg's close links to neo-Nazi groups in Great Britain. He called on the Police Service of Northern Ireland (PSNI) to establish an auxiliary police "clinic" on the estate, which had no permanent police building, so that locals concerned about crime could have somewhere to go. This followed in summer 2002 when a community centre was taken over for this purpose although Gregg's UDA objected and daubed the building with the word "tout". On 4 September 2001, Langhammer's car was blown up outside his Whiteabbey home by Gregg's men, although Langhammer himself was asleep at the time and no one was injured.

== Johnny Adair ==
Despite the continuing activity of his brigade, and his own earlier maiming, Gregg shared the reluctance of other brigadiers about what he saw as a coming war between the UVF and West Belfast brigadier Johnny Adair. Nonetheless he was not keen to antagonise Adair and so, along with McFarland, McDonald and Jimbo Simpson, accepted his invitation to attend a "Loyalist Day of Culture" organised by Adair on the Lower Shankill on 19 August 2000. Old tensions resurfaced however, and after Adair's men fought with UVF supporters at the Shankill's Rex Bar, Adair launched a pogrom of the lower Shankill, forcing out all UVF members and their families and initiating a loyalist feud.

Gregg initially remained aloof from the struggle and instead concentrated on his anti-Catholic campaign. However, in the second half of 2002 he was dragged into the conflict after Adair made him a target in his own attempts to take full control of the UDA. A UDA member originally from the Woodvale Road had moved to Rathcoole where he had been beaten up after it emerged that he was a friend of Joe English, the former brigadier who had been exiled from the estate by Gregg for his anti-drugs stance. As a result of the attack, three Woodvale UDA members went to Gregg and complained about the attack. Gregg took this as a threat and, after complaining to senior figures in the West Belfast UDA, ordered the three men to be kneecapped. The shootings raised some anger on the Shankill, where the three were well-liked figures, and Adair sought to exploit this as a method of getting rid of Gregg. He sought to portray Gregg as unstable and thuggish and spread a rumour that he was about to be replaced as brigadier.

By September 2002, Adair had even circulated stories to contacts in the media that Gregg was under death threat from the UDA. In late August, Adair had even managed to have Gregg stood down as Brigadier for "not being militant enough" and replaced by one of Adair's own associates. However, this proved short-lived. In October 2002, Gregg was one of the brigadiers who passed the resolution expelling Adair from the UDA for his involvement in the non-fatal shooting of Jim Gray.

Adair ignored the expulsion, erecting "West Belfast UDA – Business as Usual" banners on the Shankill Road, whilst continuing his struggles with the remaining brigadiers, Gregg in particular. On 8 December a bomb was found under Gregg's car, apparently placed there by one of Adair's allies from the Loyalist Volunteer Force. Soon after two pipe bombs were thrown at Gregg's house, and his friend Tommy Kirkham's house was shot at. In response, graffiti appeared around the walls of Rathcoole in December, stating: "Daft Dog and White beware. The Reaper is coming for you" as a threat to "Mad Dog" Adair and his ally John White. A bomb attack on Adair's house on 8 January 2003 was blamed on Gregg by White, although Adair himself was returned to prison two days later after a dossier detailing his drug-dealing and racketeering activities was shown to Secretary of State for Northern Ireland Paul Murphy.

== Killing and aftermath ==
On 1 February 2003, along with another UDA member, Robert "Rab" Carson, Gregg was shot dead on Nelson Street, in the old Sailortown district near the Belfast docks, while travelling in a taxi after returning from Glasgow where he regularly went to Rangers F.C. games. Gregg had been a regular visitor to Ibrox Park for a number of years, often in the company of Michael Stone, and had even picked up a conviction for violence at an Old Firm match. Gregg's movements were known to C Company member Alan McCullough who, receiving instruction from Adair (then in HMP Maghaberry), arranged for a hit team to kill Gregg and his associate as the taxi took them from the port of Belfast.

When the taxi stopped at traffic lights close to the motorway, it was rammed by another taxi which had been hijacked earlier on the Shankill Road. Masked gunmen immediately opened fire on the occupants with automatic weapons. Gregg, seated in the backseat, was hit at close range and died instantly. A mortally wounded Carson died later in hospital, and taxi driver William McKnight was seriously hurt. Gregg's 18-year-old son Stuart and another man were also in the vehicle but neither sustained injuries in the shooting attack. Carson was described by UDA sources as a "dear friend" of Gregg and a junior member of the South-East Antrim Brigade.

Gregg's killing proved to be the undoing of Adair. Gregg was the most senior UDA member killed since South Belfast brigadier John McMichael was blown up by the IRA in 1987. Despite his reputation for gangsterism, Gregg's failed attack on Gerry Adams had afforded him legendary status and, under the direction of Jackie McDonald, the remaining UDA brigadiers concluded that Adair had to be removed.

Gregg was given a paramilitary funeral which was attended by thousands of mourners, including senior UDA members Jackie McDonald, Jim Gray, Sammy Duddy and Michael Stone. Senior members of the Ulster Volunteer Force, the Loyalist Volunteer Force and Red Hand Commando also attended. A volley of shots was fired over his coffin by UDA gunmen outside his Rathcoole home. The coffin was draped in the Ulster flag and the flag of the UFF. Members of the loyalist flute band, Cloughfern Young Conquerors dressed in uniform accompanied the coffin. Afterward, a lone piper led the cortege to Carnmoney Cemetery where he was buried. At the service on 6 February, UVF/RHC representatives joined the UDA leadership in a show of anti-Adair solidarity. That same night Jackie McDonald's men raided the lower Shankill and ran those members of C Company that had remained loyal to Adair, who was still in prison, out of the city. In May of that same year, Alan McCullough was himself killed by the UDA.

Following the conclusion of the feud with Adair the UDA reconstituted its ceasefire in what they christened the "Gregg initiative". The juxtaposition of this initiative with the name of Gregg was condemned by the mother of a Catholic who had been killed by members of the South-East Antrim Brigade in 2000 as she argued "it's sickening to call it the Gregg initiative when he was a ruthless terrorist....Everyone goes on about Johnny Adair but they're all as bad as each other".

In November 2011, Stuart Gregg received £400,000 compensation for psychological trauma due to having witnessed his father's murder.

== Personal life ==
Gregg was married with one son and two stepdaughters.

Other offices
Preceded by Joe English	Ulster Defence Association South East Antrim Brigadier; 1990s–2003	Succeeded by Gary Fisher
