= John White (loyalist) =

Northern Irish loyalist politician, Ulster paramiltary group member, and murderer

Member of the Northern Ireland Forum
- In office 30 May 1996 – 25 April 1998
- Preceded by: Forum established
- Succeeded by: Forum abolished

Personal details
- Born: 1950 (age 75–76) Belfast, Northern Ireland United Kingdom
- Party: Ulster Democratic Party (before 2001)
- Known for: Leading member of the Ulster Defence Association; Perpetrator of the Murder of Paddy Wilson and Irene Andrews; Invented UFF covername
- Criminal information
- Other names: Captain Black; Coco
- Status: Released under the Good Friday Agreement
- Penalty: Life imprisonment

Details
- Victims: Paddy Wilson; Irene Andrews
- Date: 25–26 June 1973
- Killed: 2

John White (born 1950) is a Northern Irish loyalist politician and convicted murderer. White was a leading figure in the loyalist paramilitary group, the Ulster Defence Association (UDA) and murdered Irish nationalist politician Paddy Wilson and his friend Irene Andrews in 1973. After he was released following the Good Friday Agreement entered politics as a central figure in the Ulster Democratic Party (UDP). A close ally of Johnny Adair, White was run out of Northern Ireland when Adair fell from grace and is no longer involved in loyalist activism.

== Early years ==
Born in Belfast, White was one of eight children, two of whom had died in infancy, whose father was permanently disabled as a result of wartime injuries. The family had initially lived on the mainly nationalist Ballymurphy area of the Springfield Road, Belfast but had left upon the outbreak of the Troubles to move to the Old Lodge Road area of the lower Shankill. White has said that although his house "wasn't a loyalist one" his father "hated Catholics" and was bitter about what he saw as the treachery of the Republic of Ireland in not becoming involved in the Second World War.

== Early UDA activity ==
White began his career in loyalism with a group called the Woodvale Defence Association, a vigilante group based on the Woodvale estate in the upper Shankill, in the early 1970s. Before long the WDA was absorbed into the Ulster Defence Association (UDA) and White became one of this group's leading members.

White was close to Charles Harding Smith, who emerged as the first leader of the West Belfast UDA, and in April 1972 he accompanied Harding Smith to London, where the two held a meeting with an arms dealer in order to procure weapons for the UDA. However, both men were arrested after the meeting and charged with the procurement of arms. After a series of mistakes by the prosecution, the case collapsed in December of that year, allowing White and the other defendants to return to Belfast.

== Ulster Freedom Fighters and the Paddy Wilson killing ==
White was credited with inventing the "Ulster Freedom Fighters" (UFF) covername adopted in 1973 in order to help the UDA to avoid being outlawed.

He claimed that the UDA had become too bloated, having as it did around 30,000 members, to act efficiently and that it was felt there was a need to separate off a group of hardcore militants who were "willing to take the war to the IRA". When Peter Taylor replied that the majority of UFF victims were in fact Catholic civilians, White responded that the UFF felt that by killing non-combatants the Catholic community might force the IRA to surrender. He was the UFF's "Captain Black", a pseudonym often used for press statements, and that organisation admitted, without naming him, that he had been involved in murders. Amongst these was the brutal killing of the Roman Catholic Social Democratic and Labour Party Senator Paddy Wilson, who was stabbed to death and had his throat cut in 1973 along with Irene Andrews, Wilson's Protestant friend. Their bodies were found dumped in a quarry on the Hightown Road near Cavehill, with Wilson having suffered 32 stab wounds and Andrews 19. White would later claim that on the night of the killing he and Davy Payne had led an assassination squad with the intention of killing a Catholic and that Wilson and Andrews had just been discovered by accident rather than being actual targets.

Following the killings of Wilson and Andrews, White was interned for a while before being released again. He was arrested for the murders in 1978 and under interrogation confessed his guilt and expressed remorse. White was subsequently given a life sentence for the double murder. Following his imprisonment, White at first remained an important paramilitary figure and served as officer commanding of the UDA inside the Maze. He also studied with the Open University and gained a degree in Social sciences and criminology.

== Ulster Democratic Party ==
Upon his release in 1992, White joined the Ulster Democratic Party (UDP) and became a familiar face as the party worked with the Progressive Unionist Party to help broker a loyalist ceasefire. When the statement of ceasefire from the Combined Loyalist Military Command was read by Gusty Spence at Fernhill House in October 1994, White was one of the UDP delegates sitting alongside Spence. Initially a strong supporter of the Belfast Agreement, White was elected to the Northern Ireland Forum talks body in 1996, although he (along with the UDP as a whole) failed to gain a seat in the Northern Ireland Assembly in 1998. According to Sammy Duddy, White's failure to get elected was inevitable as the savage nature of his earlier double murder had even sickened many loyalists and as a result, there was a reluctance to vote for him. However, White was a high-profile figure in the developing tendency of loyalist politics and on 22 July 1996 he was part of a four-man delegation, along with Gary McMichael, David Ervine and Hugh Smyth, to meet Prime Minister John Major at 10 Downing Street.

Given his background in paramilitarism, White became the closest UDP member to Johnny Adair and began to work closely with the West Belfast Brigadier, much to the concern of many of his fellow UDP politicians, who saw Adair as a destabilising influence, especially in relations with the Ulster Volunteer Force (UVF). At this point, White remained committed to the Northern Ireland peace process and when word came out from the Maze that the incarcerated Adair was wavering in his support of peace, White accompanied Secretary of State for Northern Ireland Mo Mowlam into the jail on 9 January 1998 to meet with Adair and other leading UDA prisoners to discuss their grievances. White and Adair had been near-neighbours during Adair's childhood, with both of their families living on the Old Lodge Road, although with thirteen years between them they only vaguely knew each other.

White, who had long been a public exponent of decommissioning, accompanied Adair to meet General John de Chastelain of the Independent International Commission on Decommissioning on 10 December 1999, with leading UDA members John Gregg, Jackie McDonald and Winkie Dodds also in attendance. Although the meeting ended inconclusively, White had convinced Adair that decommissioning could make his name and soon afterwards Adair called a meeting of the Inner Council at which he said the UDA should decommission every weapon it had. All the brigadiers rejected the move, although Adair leaned on Jimbo Simpson and another unidentified brigadier so that when a vote was taken, it was tied at three votes for and three against. After the others had left, Adair invited them to a second meeting at which he did not turn up but instead sent White to read a prepared statement. In this, Adair attacked his fellow brigadiers for their lack of forward vision, particularly attacking North Antrim and Londonderry chief Billy McFarland, whom he denounced as a dinosaur. Jackie McDonald dismissed the whole plan as a scam by Adair, whom he believed wanted to make himself look good to the world's media in return for giving up a load of old and spent weapons. Around this time, Adair had already opened a new line of contact with arms dealers in Amsterdam from whom he was procuring more sophisticated weapons for his main power base of C Company.

== Adair's ally ==
As Adair moved closer towards the Loyalist Volunteer Force (LVF) and a dissident position, so too did White increasingly become associated with the renegade end of loyalism. In 1999, he strongly condemned the killing of Frankie Curry, an active dissident who had come up with the Red Hand Defenders covername, stating "It's disgraceful that a man who dedicated his life to the loyalist cause should be cut down like this by people who call themselves loyalists". When Adair, who had also praised Curry, was released under the terms of the Belfast Agreement on 14 September 1999, White met him outside the prison gates and accompanied him back to the Shankill.

White meanwhile came under heavy police surveillance. As a result of what he claimed to be his success as a property dealer he had become considerably wealthy and rumours began to circulate that his wealth was actually derived from his involvement in the drugs trade. White's nickname "Coco" emerged at this time due to his alleged involvement with cocaine. Progressive Unionist Party leader David Ervine alleged that he once heard White describe himself as a "patriotic drug dealer" whilst Jackie McDonald alleged that White and Adair once left a UDA Inner Council meeting, only to return a few minutes later with white dust around their nostrils. Adair's one-time girlfriend, Jackie "Legs" Robinson, also alleged that on one occasion she had been accompanied by White to Kelly's nightclub in Portrush and that as they travelled White took out a large bag of ecstasy tablets and gave her two. White was never prosecuted for any drug-related crimes.

On 19 August 2000, White read a brief statement at a "Loyalist Day of Culture" on the lower Shankill before Adair and other UDA members, wearing balaclavas, took the stage and fired machine guns. Later that same day a bitter loyalist feud broke out between Adair's men and the local UVF, who hated Adair's LVF allies. White's office in the mid-Shankill was blown up by the UVF as soon as the feud started and in order to underline his support for Adair, White established his new office on Boundary Way, facing Adair's house. The feud fizzled out when Adair was imprisoned soon afterwards but White remained close and the following year was a regular at the Holy Cross dispute alongside Adair's brother James.

White was again on hand when Adair was released on 15 May 2002 and made a speech in which he claimed that Adair would make "a positive contribution to the peace process". On Adair's behalf, White even held a meeting with Sinn Féin's Alex Maskey to discuss peace strategies. The meeting was not sanctioned by the rest of the UDA and soon Adair was linking up with the LVF to target fellow brigadiers such as Jim Gray and John Gregg. In October 2002, both Adair and White were expelled from the UDA after a stormy meeting of the Inner Council.

After Adair supporters killed Gregg in early 2003, Jackie McDonald launched an attack on Adair's Lower Shankill stronghold and ran his supporters, including White, out of the area. They were put on the ferry to Scotland and ordered not to return. One of the main catalysts for the launch of the attack had been a television appearance by White the day before it happened in which he described himself as "indifferent" to the killing of Gregg, a figure widely respected in loyalism for having shot and wounded Gerry Adams in the 1980s.

White and the others were escorted to Larne by the police and immediately caught the ferry to Cairnryan. White arrived in the company of "Fat" Jackie Thompson and the two were detained for a while by Met Special Branch officers attached to Dumfries and Galloway Constabulary. In the immediate aftermath he told the press "I will return". However, White, whose precise whereabouts are still unclear, stated soon afterwards that he was done with the UDA and loyalism in general. He was reported to have become a born-again Christian. A 2003 Panorama programme stated White was living in the Salford area of Manchester.

== Personal life ==
He was sometimes known by the nickname "Coco".

== Bibliography ==
- Lister, David & Jordan, Hugh. Mad Dog: The Rise and Fall of Johnny Adair and 'C' Company, Mainstream, 2004
- McDonald, Henry & Cusack, Jim. UDA: Inside the Heart of Loyalist Terror, Penguin Ireland, 2004
- Taylor, Peter. Loyalists, Bloomsbury, 2000
- Wood, Ian S., Crimes of Loyalty: A History of the UDA, Edinburgh University Press, 2006

Northern Ireland Forum
| New forum | Regional Member; 1996–1998 | Forum dissolved |
