= Jackie Mahood =

Ulster Volunteer Force member (born 1954)

- Born: c. 1954 (age 71–72); Belfast, Northern Ireland
- Occupation: Taxi firm owner
- Known for: Ulster loyalist activist Ulster Volunteer Force and Loyalist Volunteer Force member
- Spouse: Rae Mahood
- Children: 3
- Parent(s): John Alexander and Sarah Mahood

Jackie Mahood (born c. 1954) is a Northern Irish former loyalist activist with both the Ulster Volunteer Force (UVF) and Progressive Unionist Party (PUP). He later split from these groups and became associated with the breakaway Loyalist Volunteer Force (LVF), founded in 1996 by Billy Wright.

== Family ==
Mahood was born in Belfast, Northern Ireland, one of the three children of John Alexander and Sarah Mahood. He has a sister, Sandra and a deceased brother, Bobby. Mahood was brought up a Protestant in Ainsworth Avenue, a street that marks the dividing line between two staunchly loyalist areas of the upper Shankill Road and Woodvale Road. However, Ainsworth Avenue had a significant Catholic minority population and linked directly to the mainly Catholic Springfield Road until the early years of the Troubles when the Ulster Defence Association (UDA) erected temporary barricades which were later replaced with peace lines. He is married to Rae, by whom he has three children. His father, a member of the Orange Order, died in January 2008.

== UVF and PUP activity ==
A member of the UVF, Mahood was sentenced to 14 years in 1975 for wounding with a firearm during a gun attack on a pub and possession of an illegal gun. Like a number of his contemporaries, Mahood joined the PUP after serving time in prison for offences related to his membership of the UVF. Following his release from prison, Mahood returned to the UVF and served as commander in north Belfast in the mid-1990s.

Following the Combined Loyalist Military Command (CLMC) ceasefire of 1994, Mahood was part of the first PUP delegation to hold talks with representatives of the British government. Mahood was on poor terms with David Ervine, who feared the growth of the hawkish Billy Wright and his allies. Ervine threatened to resign from the talks team over the inclusion of Mahood. Mahood eventually left the PUP after becoming disillusioned with the Belfast Agreement.

== Dissident loyalist ==
Although based in Belfast, Mahood was close to UVF Mid-Ulster Brigade leader Billy Wright and helped to establish the LVF in 1996 after Wright and his Portadown unit were stood down by the UVF Brigade Staff (Belfast leadership) in August of that year. According to David Ervine, Mahood had acted as the liaison between the Brigade Staff and Wright; in this capacity he agitated for Wright to be accepted as the UVF's chief strategist just before the split, although Ervine also suggested that Mahood was highly unpopular with the rest of the UVF leadership, apart from Wright, due to his involvement in criminality. Ervine went on to claim that Mahood had provided the gun which was taken from the UVF Shankill Road arms dump that the Mid-Ulster Brigade used to kill Catholic taxi driver Michael McGoldrick in July 1996 at the height of the Drumcree stand-off, an act which led to Wright's expulsion from the UVF as the leadership had not sanctioned the murder. According to Ervine, the gun was procured from the arms dump to incriminate the Belfast UVF while the organisation was on ceasefire at the time. These allegations were published in Ed Moloney's book Voices From the Grave: Two Men's War in Ireland in 2010 and infuriated Mahood who publicly denied Ervine's claim that he had provided the weapon used in McGoldrick's killing, maintaining that he was the victim of a UVF "smear campaign". Following the LVF's establishment, Mahood encouraged Wright to challenge the Brigade Staff and return the entire UVF to a war footing. Mahood also enjoyed a close relationship with UDA leader Jim Spence and encouraged Spence to link up with Wright. However, Spence, who had no desire for a feud with the UVF, kept his distance from the man he nicknamed "Billy Wrong". Mahood was shot by masked men as he sat in his office in Belfast's Crumlin Road on 27 November 1997. He was hit three times in the neck and jaw and left for dead, although he survived the attack. Mahood claimed that the UVF was behind the attack and also claimed to know the identity of the shooter.

Mahood also became an ally of dissident former Red Hand Commando hitman Frankie Curry and, in 1999, when Curry was killed, Mahood allegedly used the cover name "Red Hand Defenders" to issue a death threat against the journalists Henry McDonald and Jim Cusack, accusing them of helping to get Curry killed by reporting on his involvement in a bombing campaign. Mahood himself was targeted a number of times in assassination attempts by the UVF and as he grew closer to the UDA on the Shankill, which maintained links with the LVF, his name appeared on one of their leaflets, accusing the UVF of being "Protestant killers" due to the killings of Curry, Andrew Robb and David McIlwaine and attempts on the lives of Mahood, Clifford Peeples and Kenny McClinton.

In July 2000, Mahood was shot at for the second time as he dropped an employee off at his home in Lavens Drive in North-West Belfast. Shots were fired into his car but Mahood sped away to a nearby Royal Ulster Constabulary (RUC) station on Tennant Street off the Shankill Road. From there he was taken to hospital to be treated for shrapnel wounds, having escaped being hit by the bullets.

On 21 August 2000, Mahood's older brother Bobby was shot and killed by the UVF along with his friend UDA commander Jackie Coulter close to Crumlin Road. Bobby Mahood, a publican and former UVF member, and Coulter were shot as a part of a loyalist feud between the UVF and UDA West Belfast Brigade.

Mahood became close to Johnny Adair and was at the UDA leader's house in 2002 when they learned about the suicide of LVF chief Mark "Swinger" Fulton, who had succeeded Billy Wright as leader following the latter's assassination inside the Maze Prison by Irish National Liberation Army (INLA) prisoners in December 1997. When Adair was removed from the UDA leadership and Jim Spence emerged as a leading figure, the relationship between Mahood and Spence deteriorated severely, to the point that in 2003 The People reported that the two men had brawled in the street in the Lyndhurst area near Glencairn where they were both living at the time.

In 2008, Mahood, along with Kenny McClinton and Alex Kerr, was reported as having refused to co-operate with the inquiry into Billy Wright's killing.

== "Taxi wars" ==
Until rival loyalist paramilitaries forced him out of business in the 2000s, Mahood ran the most successful taxi firm based in North Belfast, operating a fleet of taxis which serviced the greater Belfast area. The business turned an estimated £70,000 a year profit. His drivers received death threats and 24 taxis were subjected to arson and gun attacks. The so-called "taxi wars" had seen the offices of Mahood's Call-A-Cab firm attacked by the UVF whilst also seeing the LVF return fire on the Ballysillan-based Sunningdale Taxis.

The loss of the business forced him into bankruptcy with his official notice posted on 14 August 2009. He attempted to gain compensation but initially was turned down by the Secretary of State for Northern Ireland Shaun Woodward. However, a court subsequently ruled that Mahood could take his claim to court when it emerged that a clandestine offer had been made to him by the Northern Ireland Office. Mahood sought £400,000 compensation for the loss of his business, arguing that it had been caused by repeated attacks on his depot by loyalists, but the case was dismissed.
