= Murders of Andrew Robb and David McIlwaine =

2000 killings in Northern Ireland

Andrew Robb and David McIlwaine killings
- Teenagers David McIlwaine (left) and Andrew Robb (right) were killed by members of the Ulster Volunteer Force as part of a feud with the Loyalist Volunteer Force
- Location: 54°19′45″N 6°25′26″W; Druminure Road, Tandragee, County Armagh, Northern Ireland
- Date: 19 February 2000 c. 5.00 a.m. GMT
- Attack type: Beating, stabbing
- Deaths: 2
- Perpetrators: 3 members of the Ulster Volunteer Force Mid-Ulster Brigade

The Tandragee killings took place in the early hours of Saturday 19 February 2000 on an isolated country road outside Tandragee, County Armagh, Northern Ireland. Two young Protestant men, Andrew Robb and David McIlwaine, were beaten and repeatedly stabbed to death in what was part of a Loyalist feud between the Ulster Volunteer Force (UVF) and their rivals, the breakaway Loyalist Volunteer Force (LVF). The men were not members of any loyalist paramilitary organisation. It later emerged in court hearings that Robb had made disparaging remarks about the killing of UVF Mid-Ulster Brigade leader Richard Jameson by an LVF gunman the previous month. This had angered the killers, themselves members of the Mid-Ulster UVF, and in retaliation they had lured the two men to the remote lane on the outskirts of town, where they killed and mutilated them.

Three men had carried out the double killing: Stephen Leslie Brown (also known as Stephen Leslie Revels), Noel Dillon, and Mark Burcombe. On 3 April 2009, Brown was sentenced to 35 years' imprisonment for each count of murder. Dillon committed suicide in January 2005, and Burcombe, originally charged with the killings, turned 'Queen's evidence' by testifying against Brown and therefore received a reduced sentence. The trial judge, Mr. Justice Gillen, stated that the murders, perpetrated 22 months after the signing of the Good Friday Agreement, were "among the most gruesome of the past 40 years". Both teenagers sustained penetrating, multiple knife wounds inflicted with a butcher's knife which nearly decapitated them. Additionally, Brown stabbed McIlwaine deeply in his left eye.

The UVF's Brigade Staff (Belfast leadership) did not sanction the killings.

== Background ==
The origins of the lethal 2000–2001 loyalist feud which erupted between the Ulster Volunteer Force (UVF) and the Loyalist Volunteer Force (LVF) began when a brawl broke out in the Portadown F.C. Society Club on 27 December 1999. The leader of the UVF Mid-Ulster Brigade, Richard Jameson, had been jostled and insulted by members of the LVF who had been holding a celebration at the club to commemorate the second anniversary of the shooting death of their former leader, Billy Wright. Wright had founded the LVF in 1996 after he and the Portadown unit of the Mid-Ulster Brigade had been stood down by the UVF's Brigade Staff following an unauthorised sectarian killing carried out by his men during the Drumcree standoff. In December 1997 Wright was shot dead inside the Maze Prison by the Irish National Liberation Army (INLA).

Shortly after Jameson left the club, he returned with a number of UVF men armed with baseball bats and pickaxe handles. A violent altercation broke out in which 12 people were seriously injured including three LVF prisoners out on Christmas parole. The LVF decided to retaliate and sent a gunman to assassinate Jameson in the driveway outside his home on 10 January 2000. The UVF's Brigade Staff in Belfast immediately convened a "war council" at "the Eagle", their headquarters over a chip shop on the Shankill Road, where they discussed plans to avenge Jameson's killing. The LVF's leader, Mark "Swinger" Fulton, who was imprisoned at the time, claimed to no avail that his organisation had not been involved in the shooting.

== Deaths ==
=== Preliminary events ===
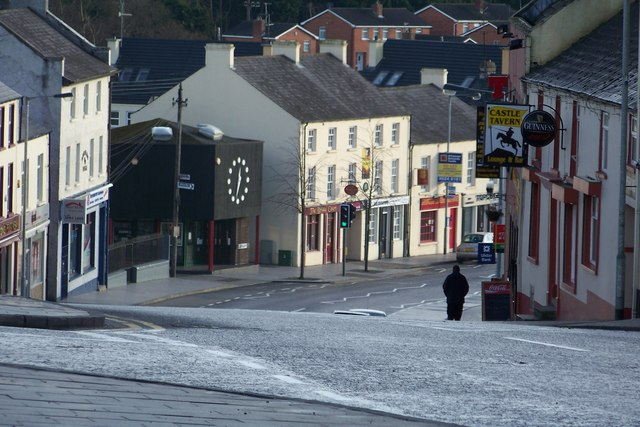
Tandragee, County Armagh, where Andrew Robb and David McIlwaine had gone on Friday night 18 February 2000

At 1:30 a.m. on Saturday 19 February 2000, Protestant acquaintances, Andrew Robb, a 19-year-old unmarried father, and David McIlwaine (known to his friends as "Mackers"), an 18-year-old graphic design student at Lurgan Tech, both of Portadown, had left "The Spot" nightclub in Tandragee together with three others after spending Friday night out. The club was then being managed by Willie Frazer, well known as a loyalist victims' advocate and political activist, who has since suggested that the killings were linked to a threat posed to him by the UVF. Billy Wright had reportedly frequented the nightclub before his imprisonment and death.

The group of three men and two women had attempted to enter a taxi, but regulations had stipulated that not more than four passengers could travel together, so Robb and McIlwaine got out of the vehicle and went off in search of a house party. The pair knocked on the door of a house in Sinton Park belonging to Mid-Ulster UVF member Stephen Leslie Brown (19, also known as "Stephen Leslie Revels") and were invited inside where other UVF members Noel Dillon (older brother of Brown's girlfriend) and Mark Burcombe (19) were also present. Alcoholic beverages were consumed at the party.

The atmosphere inside the house suddenly turned ugly when Dillon asked the teenagers what they felt about the LVF killing of UVF Mid-Ulster brigadier Richard Jameson, who had been a successful businessman and was extremely popular in the Portadown area. McIlwaine remained silent, however Robb had replied "so fucking what, it's got fuck all to do with me" which Dillon had taken exception to. When he informed Robb that Jameson had been his good friend, Robb had made further disparaging comments which also angered Brown. Brown, out of earshot of the teenagers, had decided to assault Robb in retaliation, saying he would "punch the head off Andrew". Neither Robb nor McIlwaine had been a member of any loyalist paramilitary organisation, although Robb had tenuous links to the LVF having been an associate of Billy Wright, and even photographed in 1996 at a march led by Wright. Writers Henry McDonald and Ian S. Wood alleged that, unknown to the teenagers, a UVF unit had gone to "The Spot" to seek out two known LVF individuals rumoured to have been involved in Jameson's killing; however, they had already left the nightclub by the time the UVF arrived. The UVF men encountered Robb and McIlwaine instead, and targeted them as LVF members implicated in Jameson's death.

=== Attacks ===
Under the pretence of another party elsewhere, Brown lured Robb and McIlwaine to get into his car along with Dillon and Burcombe. Brown drove off towards Druminure Road where he stopped the car at a gate leading to a field and ordered the passengers to get out. Burcombe led McIlwaine away from the vehicle; as they were walking downhill, Burcombe informed McIlwaine that the other two men were going to "give Andrew Robb a beating for slabbering [talking in an offensive manner] about Richard Jameson. Don't worry about it, it's nothing to do with you". Brown and Dillon proceeded to attack Robb with a series of savage kicks. He was then stabbed deeply in the abdomen and throat, and died instantly. He also sustained wounds and gashes to his face and head.

The two perpetrators returned, both "walking with a swagger" to where McIlwaine waited downhill from the parked car with Burcombe. McIlwaine at that moment made an attempt to run away but Brown, Dillon, and Burcombe caught up with him as he fell to the ground. Brown gave him a severe kicking, mostly in the head. Dillon produced a butcher's knife and cut McIlwaine's throat while Brown shouted encouragement and Burcombe overlooked the scene from about five feet away. Brown and Dillon left McIlwaine still breathing on the ground; once they were back inside the car, Brown proposed to drive the car over his head, but Dillon dissuaded him. Brown halted the vehicle, took the knife and walked back over to where McIlwaine was lying on the road making a "wheezing" sound. Brown stabbed McIlwaine repeatedly in the face and chest. When he noticed that McIlwaine appeared to be looking up at him, Brown stabbed him deeply in his left eye; the wound penetrated his brain, killing him. According to Burcombe's later testimony, Brown appeared "crazed" as he handed the knife back to Dillon and said he was "buzzing"; he subsequently went on to recount stabbing McIlwaine in the eye. He threatened to cut Burcombe's throat or kill a member of his family if he told anyone what happened.

== Aftermath ==
Several hours later at 9:30 a.m., the mutilated bodies of Robb and McIlwaine were discovered lying in pools of blood on the roadside 100 metres apart from one another by a woman taking her children to dancing lessons. Because of the devastating stab wounds inflicted upon the teenagers, the RUC had assumed that McIlwaine had received a shotgun blast to his face. Both of their throats were slashed so deeply that the teenagers were nearly decapitated. The RUC immediately set up an inquiry into the killings. Post mortems revealed that Robb had sustained a severe cut throat injury to the neck and a penetrating wound to the abdomen with three penetrating wounds. There were no defence injuries. McIlwaine received a severe cut throat injury, seven penetrating wounds to the chest and penetrating wounds to the face and to the left eye. Both teenagers were intoxicated at the time of their deaths.

The killings deeply shocked the community and were strongly condemned by local politicians. "The Spot"'s then manager, Willie Frazer also condemned the killings. The young men's funerals attracted hundreds of mourners; they were buried in adjacent graves at Kernan Cemetery in Portadown. Ulster Democratic Party representative John White and Johnny Adair, the Ulster Defence Association's (UDA) "C Company" West Belfast Brigade commander both attended Robb's funeral, whereas Democratic Unionist Party (DUP) assemblyman Paul Berry and Richard Jameson's brother Bobby attended McIlwaine's. After the attacks Adair branded the UVF "Protestant killers" and even produced a news-sheet in which he listed McIlwaine and Robb as Protestant victims of the UVF along with the likes of the murdered Frankie Curry and regular targets Jackie Mahood, Kenny McClinton and Clifford Peeples.

The UVF Brigade Staff in Belfast had not sanctioned the killings of Robb and McIlwaine. Although in the weeks prior to the teenagers' deaths, the UVF leadership had put much pressure on the Mid-Ulster Brigade to find the LVF men responsible for Jameson's shooting, and had threatened to send a team from Belfast "to do the job for them" if they didn't hit back against the LVF quickly enough. The LVF leadership, however maintained that the blame for the killings "lies at the door of the Eagle"; a reference to the Brigade Staff headquarters on the Shankill Road. It then threatened to strike back against carefully selected targets in the Belfast UVF.

A year after the killings, Robb's 16-year-old sister Jenna was beaten up by a group of boys belonging to the Young Citizens Volunteers (YCV), the UVF's youth wing, who had followed her as she walked along a Portadown street. As they beat her with hockey sticks, they repeatedly called her an "LVF bastard". She was left with bruises to her head, arms, and back. She was so traumatised by the attack that she was afraid to return to school.

=== Arrests and allegations ===
The day after the homicides, a number of people were arrested in connection to the crime, including Noel Dillon. The arrests were not made under anti-terrorist legislation and the suspects were all released unconditionally the same evening. On 27 February 2000, Stephen Brown was brought before the Armagh magistrate's court after he was charged with both murders. The police told the court they had plenty of forensic evidence connecting him to the homicides. Ten months later, Brown was released on bail after the court was told the prosecution had expressed doubts about their principal witness and the forensic evidence was not sufficient to secure a conviction. On 6 February 2001, the charges against Brown were unexpectedly dropped by the Director of Public Prosecutions. In April 2001, Mark Burcombe was arrested under the Prevention of Terrorism Acts in relation to his UVF activities, but was released without charge.

David McIlwaine's father, Paul, campaigned for nine years to obtain justice for his son. He enlisted the aid of a nationalist human rights group and set up his own online support group, "Justice for David McIlwaine". He alleged that the police were protecting the identity of a local Tandragee UVF commander (now deceased), who was reportedly present at the scene of the crime and was working as an agent for RUC Special Branch. He had been a close friend of Richard Jameson and had allegedly vowed to seek revenge against the LVF for his assassination. In 2005, the UVF Brigade Staff had conducted an internal investigation into the attacks.

On 2 November 2005, the Tandragee double killing was reconstructed and featured on the BBC One programme Crimewatch in which a £10,000 award was offered. After viewing the programme, Mark Burcombe consulted a clergyman and solicitor, and subsequently presented himself to police outside Hillsborough Castle to give them information regarding the events which took place on 19 February 2000. He was interviewed about the killings over a period of four days and admitted to having known both Robb and McIlwaine. He was arrested and charged with the murders along with Stephen Brown, who had also been arrested on 7 November 2005 in connection with the double killing. When Detective Chief Inspector Tim Hanley charged Brown with the murders, the latter pleaded not guilty to each charge. Noel Dillon had committed suicide in January of that same year. In January 2008, shortly before his trial was due to start, Burcombe decided to turn "Queen's evidence". He formally agreed to admit to and give a full account of his own role in the murders and to give evidence against Stephen Brown. He signed an Agreement under the Serious Organised Crime and Police Act 2005 to receive a reduced sentence in return for giving evidence against his co-defendant. Specially trained Detectives from the PSNI Crime Operations Department conducted a full Debrief of Burcombe concerning his own criminality and the criminality of others involved.

=== Convictions ===
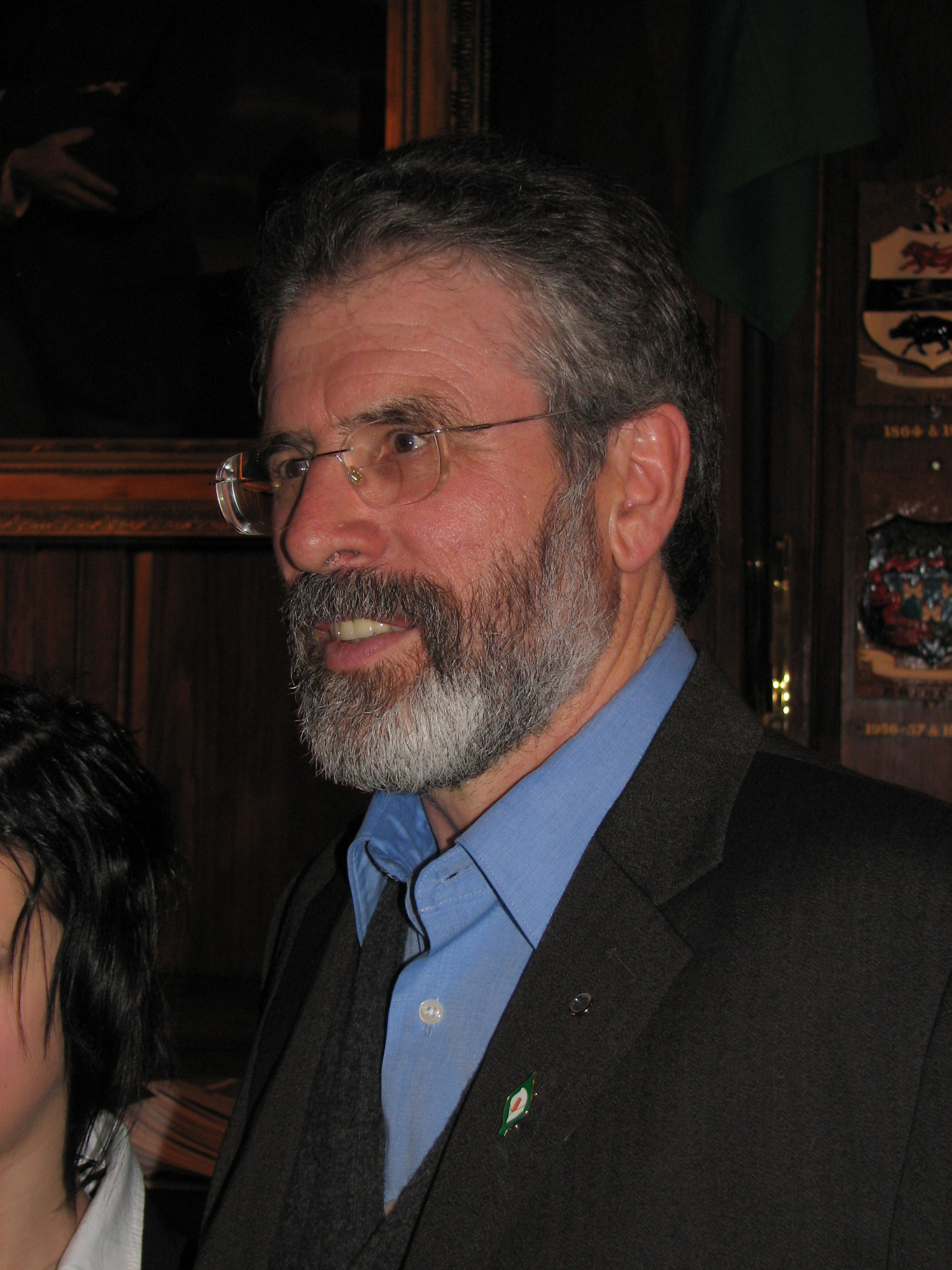
Sinn Féin president Gerry Adams, in a letter to the Attorney General for Northern Ireland, described the Tandragee killings as "a barbaric act"

Burcombe pleaded guilty to the offence of conspiracy to cause grievous bodily harm to Andrew Robb and was sentenced to 28 months' imprisonment with two months consecutive for an unrelated suspended sentence. The Robb and McIlwaine families were outraged and disappointed at the leniency shown to Burcombe. Sinn Féin president Gerry Adams asked Patricia Scotland, Baroness Scotland of Asthal, the Attorney General for Northern Ireland to review the case and consider an appeal to impose a heavier sentence, writing that "all records before the courts on this crime verify it was a barbaric act". Adams also went on to affirm that he shared the McIlwaine family's belief that a state agent was involved in the homicides and was being protected. Lady Scotland, however, backed the plea bargain deal.

Stephen Brown was found guilty of the murders on 3 March 2009. The trial, which had commenced on 25 November 2008, was held at the Belfast Crown Court without a jury. The prosecution had relied upon three pieces of evidence to prove Brown's culpability. These were the testimony of Mark Burcombe, who had witnessed McIlwaine's killing and had been present at Robb's killing; the forensic material found by the RUC at the crime scene (including DNA samples found on McIlwaine's jacket which matched Brown's); the hearsay evidence of Brown's former girlfriend who claimed he had admitted to her that he had killed McIlwaine. Burcombe declared that McIlwaine was murdered because he had witnessed Robb's killing.

One month later, 3 April, Brown was sentenced to 35 years' imprisonment for each count of murder. The trial judge, who had passed sentence on Brown, declared that the murders were "among the most gruesome of the past 40 years". He went on to add, "they represent unbridled mindless violence and a total disregard for the value and dignity of human life": Brown made an unsuccessful appeal to have his murder conviction overturned on 24 May 2011.
