= Frankie Curry =

Ulster loyalist

- Born: c. 1955; Belfast, Northern Ireland
- Died: 17 March 1999 (aged 43–44); Belfast, Northern Ireland
- Cause of death: Multiple gunshot wounds to the head
- Resting place: Roselawn Cemetery, Belfast
- Citizenship: British
- Years active: 1972–1999
- Known for: Ulster loyalist
- Relatives: Gusty Spence, Billy Spence (uncles)

Frankie Curry (c. 1955 – 17 March 1999) was a Northern Irish loyalist who was involved with a number of paramilitary groups during his long career. A critic of the Northern Ireland peace process, Curry was killed during a loyalist feud.

== UVF and RHC ==
A native of Belfast's Shankill Road and a nephew of Gusty Spence, Curry became involved in the Ulster Volunteer Force (UVF) at an early age, claiming that he had helped conceal guns in the aftermath of the June 1966 murder of Catholic civilian Peter Ward by Spence, Robert Williamson and Hugh McClean in the Malvern Arms bar on the Shankill.

Curry's reputation within the UVF soon grew and in 1972 at the age of 17, he was a central figure in the plot to break his uncle Gusty Spence out of the Maze Prison. Curry was driving Spence back to prison after a period of leave when their car was stopped by a UVF patrol and Spence was "abducted". In fact both Curry and Spence were closely involved in planning and executing the supposed kidnapping. Curry knew in advance the Springmartin Road location on which the event was to take place and had been told specially by the UVF leadership to drive Spence that day.

Curry operated as part of the UVF's Red Hand Commando (RHC) and was said to have been responsible for at least twelve of the killings claimed by the RHC. Curry himself would claim to have been involved in at least 16 deaths, claiming 19 in another interview, and had even described himself as a serial killer. He stated that he had killed Bernard Rice, Patrick McCrory and Sean McConville in 1972 before killing Michael Coleman, Joseph McAleese, John McCormac and Thomas Holmes Curry the following year. All seven men were Catholic civilians.

=== Prison and aftermath ===
During his time as a paramilitary Curry served a number of spells in prison. In 1973 he was given four years for intimidation and handling stolen goods and the following year was given twelve years for attempting to murder four youths on the Antrim Road. During his trial Curry identified himself as a member of the Red Hand Commando and refused to recognise the court. Sometime before 1982 Curry switched to membership of the Ulster Defence Association (UDA) and in 1982 he was returned to prison after being found transporting 101 bullets in his car for that organisation. He was jailed again in 1985 for possessing a gun and 900 rounds of ammunition. In 1986 he went on hunger strike over conditions, shedding two stone in weight and being hospitalised before ending his protest. During this spell he had an extra year added to his sentence after taking part in a prison protest that caused £1 million of damage to Crumlin Road gaol. Soon after this Curry fell out with the UDA and left the group, returning to the RHC. He would return to prison in 1995 for a nine-month sentence on charges of impersonating a police officer as part of a failed plan to hijack a lorry.

Henry McDonald and Jim Cusack have claimed that Curry suffered from severe mood swings as well as an addiction to morphine-based painkillers. Cusack and McDonald further claim that one of Curry's final acts on behalf of the RHC was the killing of Billy Elliot, whose death was ordered by RHC supreme command after his involvement in the brutal killing of Margaret Wright at a loyalist shebeen. Curry confirmed himself as Elliot's killer in an interview shortly before his death.

== Dissident activity ==
On 28 August 1996, the UDA's South Belfast Brigadier Alex Kerr, and head of the UVF Mid-Ulster Brigade Billy Wright, were expelled from the Combined Loyalist Military Command and ordered to leave Northern Ireland after the pair had lent their support to a campaign against the Belfast Agreement in general and the Progressive Unionist Party and Ulster Democratic Party in particular. The campaign was being led by former UDA hitman and Ulster Independence Movement member Pastor Kenny McClinton.

However Curry admired Wright and his Mid-Ulster UVF dissidents and had forged close links with the group, which would soon re-emerge as the Loyalist Volunteer Force (LVF), in the run-up to the Drumcree conflict of 1996. A photograph showing Curry embracing Wright at a 1996 Portadown rally in support of "King Rat" was published at this time. Curry's involvement with Wright saw him expelled from the RHC and ordered to stand down by the Shankill UVF. Curry however, who also had some skill as a bomb-maker, ignored the orders and offered his services to any loyalist paramilitary group that felt it could use him.

Curry began to use the term 'Red Hand Defenders' in late 1996 as a means of allowing loyalists officially on ceasefire to continue their activity. Publicly however, Curry consistently denied any involvement in the RHD as well as any links to the LVF, claims that were regularly published in the press. Curry soon fell in with a group of dissidents within the West Belfast UDA and constructed a number of car bombs for them, including one that detonated under the car of Eddie Copeland on 22 December 1996, injuring the well-known Provisional IRA volunteer. A further car bomb Curry made for the UDA was used to kill Glen Greer on 25 October 1997 outside his Bangor home. Greer, who had been a UDA member in the Kilcooley estate, had long been under threat due to allegations that he had worked as an informer for the RUC Special Branch. McDonald and Cusack claimed that Curry shot and killed William "Wassy" Paul, a former UVF member, on 3 July 1998 in what police believed to be part of a feud over drugs. The two had a long-running personal enmity and Curry would confess to being the murderer shortly before his own death the following year.

Curry also continued his links with the LVF and on 5 September 1998 a pipe bomb he manufactured was brought to Drumcree by Muriel Landree, a close ally of Billy Wright, before being lobbed by an unidentified rioter, resulting in the death of Constable Frankie O'Reilly, a Royal Ulster Constabulary officer. O'Reilly, who was raised a Catholic but had converted to Presbyterianism, was the first victim of the RHD. A second followed on Halloween when a Catholic civilian, Brian Service, was shot on Alliance Avenue, a street that divides the republican Ardoyne area from the loyalist Upper Ardoyne. An attack on a Catholic bar on the outskirts of West Belfast was carried out that same week after Curry had encouraged dissident gunmen to do so, although this attack resulted in no fatalities. Curry returned to prison in early 1999, serving a short spell in Magilligan for failing to pay fines related to driving offences before being released on 15 March that same year.

== Death and aftermath ==
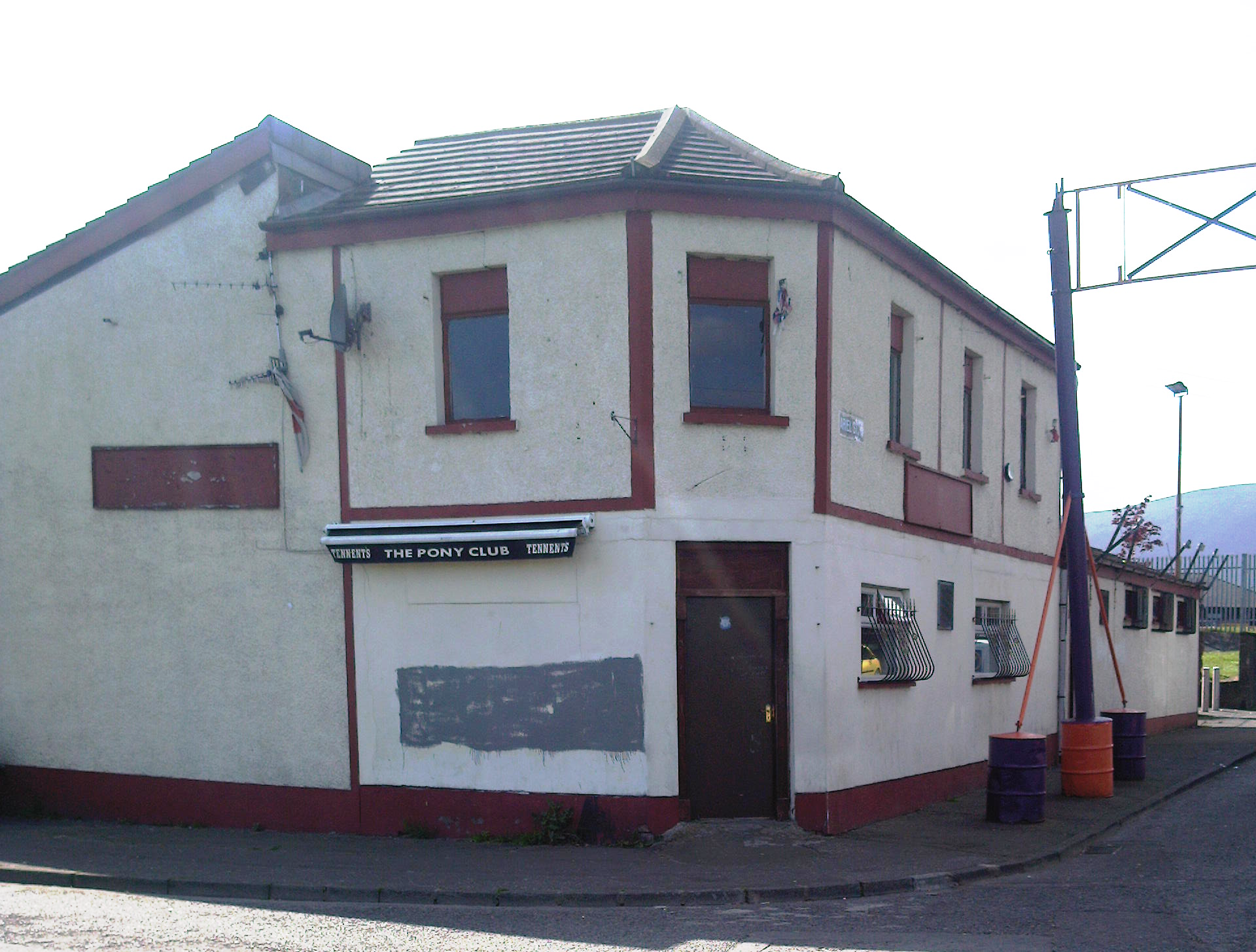
The Pony Club, Malvern Street, off Belfast's Shankill Road. Curry's body was found behind this building

Curry's activity, and in particular his association with dissident elements within the UDA, had made him an unpopular figure with the leadership of that group whilst, despite his link to Gusty Spence and his history within the movement, the UVF had washed their hands of him. On St Patrick's Day, 17 March 1999, a group of UDA members from North Down who were friends of "Wassy" Paul swooped on Curry on the Shankill Road and shot him dead as he left the Shankill Community Centre. His body was found behind the Pony Trotting Supporters Sports and Social Club with several bullet wounds to the back of the head. Although Curry had earlier relocated to Portadown, his mother remained on the Shankill and he had been in the area to visit her that day.

Curry's death saw an angry reaction from both the UDA's C Company on the Shankill and the LVF, with a death threat issued against McDonald and Cusack by LVF associate Jackie Mahood and his dissident UDA allies due to their reporting of Curry's involvement in bomb-making, an issue that his loyalist supporters felt was the crucial factor in the decision to kill Curry. For its part, the Red Hand Defenders issued a statement which blamed the killing on the UVF and threatened retaliation, although Gusty Spence, by then a leading figure in the Progressive Unionist Party (PUP), quickly denied the claims that it was a UVF attack, a sentiment echoed by PUP leader David Ervine. The killing was also condemned by Ulster Democratic Party activist John White who said "it's disgraceful that a man who dedicated his life to the loyalist cause should be cut down like this by people who call themselves loyalists". Curry was close to White and had hoped to see him on the day of his killing in order that White might help him with some job applications.

White would claim at Curry's funeral that the killing had been sanctioned by a major loyalist paramilitary group. By early 2000 the killing of Curry, as well as attempts by the UVF to kill Mahood, McClinton and Orange Volunteers founder and associate of Curry Clifford Peeples, prompted Johnny Adair, to whom White was close, to throw the full weight of the Shankill UDA behind the dissident campaign.

It was claimed in 2023 that Curry's death was approved by RHC supremo Winston Rea over the disappearance of a large amount of money Curry had stolen in a number of robberies.
