= Muriel Gibson =

Northern Irish loyalist

- Born: 29 September 1949 (age 76); Portadown, County Armagh, Northern Ireland
- Known for: Member of Loyalist Volunteer Force (LVF)
- Spouse: William Landry
- Children: Rain Landry; Talutha Landry; Aisha Landry; Mahatma Landry; Oddysseus Landry

Muriel Gibson (born 29 September 1949) is a leading Northern Irish loyalist who was a member of the Loyalist Volunteer Force (LVF). The organisation was founded in 1996 by Billy Wright. She was acquitted of murdering a Catholic council worker, Adrian Lamph, in 1998, but convicted in January 2007 and sentenced to eight years imprisonment for destroying evidence following the 1998 murder, impeding the arrest and prosecution of his killers, and LVF membership. She was also found guilty of withholding information regarding a shooting, possession of firearms, detonators and pipe bombs.

Her co-accused, LVF leader Jim Fulton, was convicted of directing the 1999 murder of Elizabeth O'Neill, along with a series of other offences, and sentenced to life imprisonment. Their trial, which lasted from September 2005 until December 2006, was the longest in the legal history of Northern Ireland.

== Early years and marriage ==
Gibson was born in Portadown, County Armagh, Northern Ireland on 29 September 1949 and was brought up as a Protestant. She grew up in Portadown's Brownstown estate. In the early 1970s she met her former husband, William Landry, on hippie camp trips. Together they have two sons, Mahatma and Oddysseus; and three daughters, Rain, Talutha and Aisha. Gibson and Landry divorced around 1999 or 2000. Her sons live with her ex-husband in California.

Gibson was charged with possession of a controlled drug in 1969 at Bow Street Magistrates' Court when she was 19 years old. In 1990, she was imprisoned for a year in the United States for possession of illegal drugs. Upon her release in 1991, she returned to Northern Ireland.

== Loyalist Volunteer Force ==
Gibson became involved in loyalist paramilitary activities in December 1991, shortly after her return to Northern Ireland from her sojourn in the United States and imprisonment. In 1996, Billy Wright, leader of the Ulster Volunteer Force's (UVF) Mid-Ulster Brigade, formed the breakaway group, the Loyalist Volunteer Force (LVF). This came about when Wright and the Mid-Ulster's Portadown unit were stood down by the UVF's Brigade Staff (Belfast leadership) following the unsanctioned killing of a Catholic taxi driver, Michael McGoldrick, by the Mid-Ulster Brigade while the UVF were on ceasefire. Expelled from the UVF and threatened with execution, Wright defied the Belfast leadership and took most of the officially-disbanded Portadown unit with him, including brothers Mark "Swinger" Fulton and Jim Fulton. Gibson also became a member of the new loyalist paramilitary organisation. In June 1997 the LVF was proscribed by the British Government and six months later, Wright was shot dead at the Maze Prison by the Irish National Liberation Army (INLA); Gibson acted as one of Wright's pallbearers at his funeral. Following Wright's assassination, Mark Fulton took over as the LVF's leader.

On 21 April 1998, 29-year-old Catholic council worker, Adrian Lamph was killed outside Fair Green Amenity Centre in Portadown. He was shot in the head at close range by an LVF gunman on a mountain bike wearing a red scarf over his face. The shot allegedly hit Lamph between the eyes and blew his head off. Gibson later claimed she came upon the naked gunman in an alleyway. She took away the gun used in the shooting and hid it, while another LVF member burned his clothing to destroy evidence. She also arranged for the bike to be thrown into the river. Lamph was the last victim of the LVF before they called a ceasefire in May 1998. In 1999, Gibson got into a violent street altercation with Mid-Ulster UVF brigadier Richard Jameson, who slapped her forcefully in the face after he had accused her of involvement in drugs. She left Northern Ireland the same year along with two of her daughters, and transferred to England. She first took up residence at a bed-and-breakfast in Plymouth, Devon but shortly afterwards moved to Cornwall. Immediately after her arrival in England she was put under police surveillance. The following January, Jameson was shot dead by the LVF outside his home in Portadown. In March 2000, Fulton was deported from the United States for breaches of immigration laws and went to live in Plymouth.

== Arrest and imprisonment ==
In June 2001, Gibson and her two daughters, Rain and Talutha Landry were arrested in Cornwall, where she had been living, following taped conversations the three women had with Fulton and undercover police officers in which they boasted about their involvement in various LVF-related attacks and revealed the names of the perpetrators. She also admitted to having extorted money by threatening the owners and workers of local Portadown building sites and bars. Gibson had returned from a holiday in Portugal when she was arrested and brought from Cornwall to London for questioning. After four days, she and Rain were flown to Northern Ireland where they faced charges relating to terrorism. Talutha was eventually released by the London police without having been charged. At the Craigavon Magistrates Court, Gibson was accused of the murder of Adrian Lamph and Rain was charged with an arson attack and causing an explosion. Gibson pleaded not guilty, while Rain refused to answer the plea.

When Mark Fulton was found dead in Maghaberry Prison of an apparent suicide in June 2002, Jim Fulton succeeded his brother as the LVF's commander.

Gibson and Jim Fulton were indicted jointly but charged separately. Their trial, which took place at the Belfast Crown Court, lasted from September 2005 to December 2006, making it the longest in Northern Ireland's legal history. Gibson faced a total of 11 charges, including the murder of Lamph and conspiring to cause explosions in the Republic of Ireland, all of which she denied. She claimed in her defence that she had lied to the undercover police officers in an effort to impress them. Her taped conversations with the undercover police officers in England were presented at court. Although Gibson was acquitted of Lamph's murder, she was convicted of destroying evidence, and impeding the arrest and prosecution of his killers. She was also convicted of LVF membership, withholding information about a shooting, and possession of firearms, detonators and pipe bombs. The pipe bombs were used at the 1998 Drumcree standoff and the detonators were to be used in a proposed bombing campaign in the Republic of Ireland in 1997. Gibson had brought the pipe bombs to Drumcree after collecting them from Frankie Curry, an independent loyalist dissident who was noted for his expertise as a bomb maker. She was sentenced by Mr. Justice Harte in January 2007 to eight years imprisonment. Her co-accused Jim Fulton received a life sentence for directing the pipe-bomb killing of Elizabeth O'Neill (a Protestant married to a Catholic) and a series of other offences, including seven attempted murders. Gibson, a grandmother, was incarcerated at the Ash House block of Hydebank Young Offenders Centre Centre in Belfast.
