= Balmoral High School (disambiguation) =

Balmoral High School may refer to:

- Balmoral Hall School, Winnipeg, Manitoba, Canada
- Balmoral High School, Belfast, Northern Ireland, UK
- Balmoral Junior Secondary School, North Vancouver, British Columbia, Canada
- Balmoral State High School, Queensland, Australia
