= William James Fulton =

Northern Irish loyalist

Jim Fulton
- Born: William James Fulton; 25 November 1968 (age 57); Portadown, Northern Ireland
- Known for: Loyalist paramilitary
- Movement: Loyalist Volunteer Force
- Criminal charges: 48 separate charges, including murder and directing terrorism
- Criminal penalty: 28 years imprisonment
- Spouse: Kelly Fulton
- Parent(s): Jim Fulton and Sylvia Prentice
- Relatives: Mark "Swinger" Fulton (brother)

William James Fulton (born 25 November 1968), known as Jim Fulton, is a Northern Irish loyalist. He was a volunteer in the Loyalist Volunteer Force (LVF), the paramilitary organisation founded in 1996 by Billy Wright and later commanded by his brother Mark "Swinger" Fulton until the latter's death in 2002.

He was convicted in 2006 of LVF-related crimes; these included having ordered the murder of a local Portadown woman and seven attempted murders. Fulton was sentenced to life in prison. His trial was the longest in the legal history of Northern Ireland.

== Family ==
Fulton was born in Portadown, County Armagh, Northern Ireland in 1968. He is a son of Jim "Swinger" Fulton, a former British soldier, who worked as a window cleaner. His mother, Sylvia Prentice, came from a family of wealthy local car dealers. Fulton is married to Kelly, with whom he has several children.

== Loyalist Volunteer Force ==
Along with his older brother Mark, also known as "Swinger", and cousin Gary, Jim Fulton was a close ally of Billy Wright in the Ulster Volunteer Force's Mid-Ulster Brigade. Some time in the early 1990s, Wright succeeded Robin Jackson as commander of the brigade. In 1992, Fulton was found guilty of possession of items for terrorist purposes and served nearly three years in prison. This was one of ten convictions he had picked up by 2000.

The Fultons were founder members of the Loyalist Volunteer Force (LVF), which Wright had formed in 1996 after he and his Portadown unit were stood down by the UVF Brigade Staff in Belfast on 2 August 1996. This came about after the unauthorised killing of Catholic taxi driver Michael McGoldrick by gunmen from the Portadown unit of the Mid-Ulster Brigade during the Drumcree standoff when the UVF were on ceasefire. The killing has been reported as the first to be carried out by the LVF, although the unit remained within the UVF when it was carried out and were stood down by the Belfast-based Brigade Staff as a result of the attack. Wright took most of the members of his expelled unit with him. Following the assassination of Billy Wright inside the Maze Prison in December 1997, Fulton's brother Mark took over as commander of the LVF.

In 2000, Fulton was arrested in California along with his wife Tanya and Odysseus and Mahatma Landry, two of the sons of LVF member Muriel Gibson, on charges of possession of firearms and explosives, as well as drugs charges. When all charges not related to drugs were dropped, campaigners seeking a full investigation into the murder of Rosemary Nelson asked the US Congress to investigate the circumstances surrounding the case. Fulton had left for the United States in 1999 soon after Nelson's killing, fuelling speculation that he had been involved.

=== Trial ===
Ultimately, he was deported from the US rather than facing the charges. Returning to the United Kingdom, he settled in Plymouth in south-west England. In the town, he became associated with a gang of criminals and earned money working as a driver for them. Unbeknownst to Fulton, his associates were actually undercover police officers posing as criminals, and as he opened up to them about his leading role in paramilitarism they secretly taped his confessions. After this surveillance operation, Fulton was arrested in 2002 and charged with 64 offences relating to terrorist activity. Following his arrest, he was detained in HMP Maghaberry on a wing with just two other prisoners. One of these, his brother Mark, died there in June 2002. Jim Fulton was freed on bail soon after the death of his brother.

Fulton was convicted in 2006 for several LVF-related crimes and sentenced to life in prison. Under British law, he will have to serve at least 28 years. He was convicted of ordering the 1999 murder of Elizabeth O'Neill, a 59-year-old Protestant grandmother whose home in Portadown's Corcrain estate was attacked with a pipe bomb because she was married to a Catholic. She had died after picking up a bomb thrown through her window as she watched television.

He was also found guilty of seven attempted murders - four of them arising from a home-made grenade attack on riot police during the Drumcree protests in 1998 - two drug offences and possession of a handgun used to murder Michael McGoldrick in 1996. In all, Fulton was found guilty of 48 separate charges in a trial that proved to be the longest in the legal history of Northern Ireland. He was also acquitted of a further 14 charges. His associate was leading loyalist Muriel Gibson, who was indicted along with him.

Much of the evidence against Fulton consisted of claims he had made to undercover police officers while living in England. At his trial, he claimed that he had lied in order to impress the officers, believing they were members of an important criminal "firm".

Following his sentencing by Mr Justice Hart, one of Fulton's supporters shouted angry abuse at the judge as he left the court: "Farce, scam, you're a disgrace to law and order".

=== Convictions ===
The terrorist offences Fulton was convicted of were:

Count	Description	Sentence
1	aiding and abetting the murder of Elizabeth O'Neill	25 years
2	aiding and abetting the causing of an explosion (during the attack on O'Neill)	20 years
3 to 7	attempted murder of Janelle Woods and Stephen Black, attempting to cause grievous bodily harm with intent to Janelle Woods and Stephen Black, causing an explosion of a nature likely to endanger life or cause serious injury to property	20 years
8 to 13	attempted murder of Joseph Murnin and Mark Murphy, attempting to cause grievous bodily harm with intent to Joseph Murnin and Mark Murphy, use of a RGD-5 grenade to cause an explosion of a nature likely to endanger life or to cause serious injury to property, possession of a RGD-5 grenade with intent to cause an explosion of a nature likely to endanger life or to cause serious injury to property	20 years
14 to 17	attempted murder of RUC officers Chief Inspector Barr, Reserve Constable Irvine, Constable Harkness, Constable McBrien (during the Drumcree protests)	28 years
18 to 23	attempted wounding with intent (of four RUC officers), causing an explosion of a nature likely to endanger life or cause serious injury to property, and possession of a pipe bomb with intent to endanger life or cause serious injury to property (during the attack on RUC officers)	25 years
24	attempted armed robbery of Conor McAleavy	15 years
25	false imprisonment of Conor McAleavy	10 years
26	conspiracy to murder Derek Wray (U.D.A member)	20 years
28	wounding William Samuel Fletcher with intent to do him grievous bodily harm	20 years
29	possession of a firearm and ammunition with intent to endanger life (during the attack on Fletcher )	15 years
30 to 32	wounding James Buchanan, Jonathan Birney and Andrew Doran with intent to do grievous bodily harm (during a punishment attack)	10 years
33	possession of a firearm and ammunition with intent to endanger life (during attack on Buchanan, Birney and Doran)	15 years
34 & 35	hijacking a Post Office van & having a firearm with intent to commit an indictable offence (namely hijacking)	12 years
36	possession of a firearm and ammunition with intent to endanger life (which was used in the murder of Michael McGoldrick)	12 years
41	directing terrorism	25 years
42	illegal membership of a paramilitary organization	10 years
43	doing an act intending to pervert the course of justice	5 years
44	possession of a firearm with intent to commit an indictable offence	10 years
50	hijacking of a car belonging to Mr. McCallum	15 years
51	false imprisonment of McCallum	12 years
52	possession of a firearm with intent to commit an indictable offence (during car hijacking)	10 years
53 to 55	conspiracy to murder, doing an act with intent to cause an explosion, possession of an explosive device with intent to endanger life or cause serious injury to property (during attack on a Sinn Féin office in Newry)	20 years
59	supply of Cannabis or Cannabis Resin	14 years
60	possession of Cannabis or Cannabis Resin with intent to supply	10 years
62	possession of a firearm and ammunition in suspicious circumstances	10 years
