= Alex Kerr (loyalist) =

Northern Irish paramilitary

Alex Kerr is a Northern Irish former loyalist paramilitary. Kerr was a brigadier in the Ulster Defence Association (UDA)'s South Belfast Brigade. He is no longer active in loyalism.

== Ulster Defence Association ==
Kerr made his home on the Taughmonagh estate in southwest Belfast.

From this centre of Ulster Defence Association activity, Kerr established his power base as South Belfast brigadier. The position had been held by John McMichael until he was assassinated by the Provisional IRA in 1987. Jackie McDonald was chosen as McMichael's replacement by Andy Tyrie, but he was not trusted by the rest of the leadership and was removed less than a year later following his arrest for extortion, allowing Kerr to become the new brigadier. Kerr was on good terms with West Belfast commander Johnny Adair, and in July 1992 he provided a bolt-hole in Taughmonagh from which Adair and his men were to launch an attack on IRA commander Brian Gillen's Finaghy Road North home. The attack did not take place as the C Company unit had been observed by the Royal Ulster Constabulary (RUC) leaving the Shankill Road and were all subsequently arrested.

From the time of its establishment in 1971 until August 1992, the UDA was a legal loyalist paramilitary organisation; it was also the largest. In the spring of 1991, a year and a half before its proscription, the UDA aligned with the Ulster Volunteer Force (UVF) and its subsidiary group, the Red Hand Commando to establish the Combined Loyalist Military Command (CLMC). This was a group designed to co-ordinate military activity and hold ad hoc discussions about political strategy. Liaison officers were appointed to the new body by each of the three groups and Kerr was chosen as the UDA's military representative. Each group also appointed a political liaison officer with Kerr joined by Ray Smallwoods in this function.

In early 1994 the UDA's Inner Council was made up of its six brigadiers – Kerr for South Belfast, Adair for the UDA West Belfast Brigade, Tom Reid for North Belfast, Gary Matthews for East Belfast, Billy McFarland for County Londonderry and north County Antrim, and Joe English for the UDA South East Antrim Brigade. At the time English was attempting to build support for a ceasefire declaration by the CLMC. In this endeavour he was supported by Reid and Matthews but opposed vehemently by Adair. Along with McFarland, Kerr represented a middle group who demonstrated general agreement with English but also expressed sympathy for Adair's position that a recent upturn in UDA activity was winning the struggle against the IRA for them.

For his part Kerr was sympathetic to the adoption of a "doomsday" scenario in which Ireland would be repartitioned, with Catholics sent west of the River Bann and possibly also to an enclave in West Belfast, with both areas given over to the Republic of Ireland. The remainder of Northern Ireland would become an autonomous region within the United Kingdom.

== Split from the UDA ==
Kerr lost faith in the Northern Ireland peace process following the 1995 publication of the Frameworks document that preceded the Belfast Agreement, as he saw this document as bringing about a united Ireland by stealth. Kerr became strongly disenchanted with the strategy of the Ulster Democratic Party and argued that they, and their UVF-linked allies in the Progressive Unionist Party, were simply being used by the British government to get Sinn Féin into a devolved government.

Seeking to begin an internal campaign against the agreement Kerr initially targeted the UDP, having supporters write "Ulster Drugs Party" on the walls of The Village area of Donegall Road, a stronghold of the South Belfast Brigade. Soon Kerr ramped up his approach by giving interviews to the press in which he called for the development of a new strategy opposed to the Frameworks and a possible return to violence. On 2 June 1995 nine UDA prisoners, including Greysteel massacre perpetrators Torrens Knight and Stephen Irwin, came out in support of Kerr and were eventually moved to another wing of the Maze prison under orders from Johnny Adair, who was on remand at the time and was at that point still committed to the UDP's strategy.

Kerr became a regular face at the Drumcree conflict where he was often in the company of Billy Wright; before long the two were closely linked due to their shared distaste for the strategy of the loyalist paramilitary-linked political parties. As part of the protests a mechanical digger appeared on the loyalist side and rumours circulated that the machine was armour plated and was to be driven at the security forces. The same rumours also put Kerr in the driving seat of the vehicle. Pictures were broadcast in 1996 of the two men directing rioters on Drumcree hill against the security forces, and the CLMC decided to act against the pair after Wright's ally Clifford McKeown shot and killed a Catholic taxi driver on 1 July. The UDA acted swiftly to remove Kerr from his position as brigadier and expel him and his supporters from their membership. They sent a hit squad to his new base in Cookstown, although this attempt at assassination failed when they were intercepted by the RUC. The UVF were more recalcitrant about expelling Wright, which almost caused a rift until the UVF accepted the UDA's point of view and expelled him. Both men were placed under death sentences. Jackie McDonald replaced Kerr, becoming, for the second time, leader of the South Belfast Brigade.

== Loyalist Volunteer Force ==
Kerr and Wright however defied the ban and instead pooled their followers into a new anti-peace process organisation to be called the Loyalist Volunteer Force (LVF). This group won the support of Jackie Mahood, a former UVF prisoner and PUP spokesman, who wanted Wright to try to take control of the UVF. Mahood also sought to bring in Jim Spence from the West Belfast UDA, although he declined due to his mistrust of Wright. The new group however did win the support of Ulster Independence Movement activists Kenny McClinton, Clifford Peoples and some other Protestant fundamentalists who disagreed with the paths being taken by the leaders of the main loyalist paramilitary groups. Red Hand Commando dissident Frankie Curry also expressed his support for the new group although he declined to join, instead creating his own flag of convenience, the Red Hand Defenders, as a cover for his own activity as well as that of any dissident who chose to use the name. The formal judgement of the CLMC, which expelled Wright and Kerr and passed death sentences on them officially, completed the split. Kerr joined Wright, head of the local Orange Order Harold Gracey and Democratic Unionist Party MP William McCrea on a platform in Portadown hours before the deadline for him to leave Northern Ireland or face death was due to expire. A bomb was thrown through the window of Kerr's parents' house as soon as the deadline expired.

Kerr quickly became close to Mark "Swinger" Fulton and the two worked together to try to convince Wright of the desirability of a closer relationship with the UDA. Seeking to demonstrate the capabilities of the new group, Kerr invited the media to an LVF show of strength at Annahilt in autumn 1996 but the publicity proved counter-productive as the RUC arrived and arrested everybody at the scene. Kerr was held on remand in HMP Maghaberry after the incident.

Kerr was not released from prison until 1998 when he initially settled in the LVF stronghold of Portadown, claiming that his time in paramilitarism was over. Soon afterwards however Kerr fled the town under cover of darkness. Fulton, who had succeeded to the leadership of the LVF following Wright's 1997 killing by the Irish National Liberation Army, was pursuing Kerr's earlier idea of a close relationship with the UDA. He felt, however, that Kerr, who was still seen as a dissident by the UDA, was damaging the prospects of that happening and as such Kerr was out of favour with the new LVF leader. The UDA's South Belfast Brigade claimed that Kerr had been working for RUC Special Branch although this denied by the UVF's military liaison officer on the CLMC who claimed that, despite being opposed to the LVF, he believed that Kerr was a "true believer" and that the informer tag was simply "black propaganda".

Press reports in 2002 linked Kerr with a shadowy group of UDA dissidents who released a series of statements attacking the leadership of Jackie McDonald, and the peace process. Kerr's name was soon dropped from these press releases.

Kerr's current whereabouts are unknown. In 2009, Jackie McDonald stated that Kerr, along with Johnny Adair and John White, could never return to Northern Ireland without being killed.

Other offices
Preceded by Jackie McDonald	Ulster Defence Association South Belfast Brigadier; 1989–1995?	Succeeded by Jackie McDonald
