= Richard Jameson (loyalist) =

Northern Irish loyalist (1953–2000)

- Richard Jameson
- Born: c.1953 Portadown, County Armagh, Northern Ireland
- Died: 10 January 2000; Portadown
- Burial place: Tartaraghan Parish churchyard
- Military career
- Allegiance: Ulster Volunteer Force
- Rank: Brigade commander
- Unit: Mid-Ulster Brigade
- Conflict: The Troubles

Richard Jameson (c. 1953 – 10 January 2000), was a Northern Irish businessman and loyalist, who served as the leader of the paramilitary Ulster Volunteer Force's (UVF) Mid-Ulster Brigade. He was killed outside his Portadown home during a feud with the rival Loyalist Volunteer Force (LVF), the breakaway organisation founded by former Mid-Ulster UVF commander Billy Wright after he and the Portadown unit of the Mid-Ulster Brigade were officially stood down by the Brigade Staff (Belfast leadership) in August 1996.

Following Jameson's death, the feud between the UVF and LVF escalated into a series of retaliatory killings. These went on intermittently until the LVF disbanded in 2005.

== Early life and paramilitary career ==
Richard Jameson was born in Portadown, County Armagh, Northern Ireland to a Protestant Church of Ireland family in about 1953, one of five sons. He had a twin brother, Stuart. He was married to Moira by whom he had three children: Glen, Wayne and Kirsty. A former reservist in the Royal Ulster Constabulary (RUC) (1973–1981), he worked as a manager in the Jameson Group, a building firm which was a family-owned business. The building firm was regularly awarded government contracts to carry out work for the security forces and it was for this reason that Jameson's brother David lost a leg in a 1991 Provisional IRA bombing attack. Jameson was a member of the Orange Order's Drumherriff Star of Erin LOL 8 Portadown district.

It is not known exactly when he became a member of the Ulster Volunteer Force (UVF) nor the leader of its Mid-Ulster Brigade. The Portadown unit of the Mid-Ulster Brigade had been officially stood down by the Brigade Staff in Belfast in August 1996 when it carried out an unauthorised sectarian killing while the UVF were on ceasefire. The Mid-Ulster Brigade's commander at the time, Billy Wright, was expelled from the UVF. He brazenly defied a Combined Loyalist Military Command (CLMC) order to leave Northern Ireland or face execution by establishing the breakaway Loyalist Volunteer Force (LVF). Wright took most of the Portadown Mid-Ulster UVF with him. The units of the Mid-Ulster Brigade that remained loyal to the Brigade Staff continued to operate and Jameson became commander. He was said by The Guardian to have been a "staunch supporter of the Good Friday Agreement".

== Shooting death ==
In the weeks prior to his killing, he was in a violent street altercation with LVF member Muriel Gibson, whom he accused of involvement in drugs and slapped forcefully in the face. This was followed by a fracas at the Portadown F.C. Social Club on 27 December 1999 where LVF members were commemorating the death of their comrade Billy Wright, shot and killed inside the Maze Prison by the Irish National Liberation Army (INLA) exactly two years previously. When Jameson entered the club, several LVF men began to push and jostle him and challenged him to a fight, telling Jameson to hit them instead of women. Deeply offended, Jameson left and soon returned with a UVF gang armed with pickaxe handles and baseball bats. In the violent brawl that ensued, 12 people, including three LVF prisoners out on Christmas parole, received severe injuries. The LVF leaders subsequently made the decision that Jameson would pay for the attack with his life.

One of the LVF members, who lived near Dungannon, got in touch with a family of north Belfast loyalists who had been members of the UVF but who had left after Wright's expulsion. From these former UVF members the LVF obtained the gun with which to shoot Jameson. On the evening of 10 January 2000, Jameson returned from work and drove his Isuzu Trooper jeep into the driveway outside his home on the Derrylettiff Road near Portadown. Waiting in ambush, a single gunman suddenly approached from the passenger side of the parked jeep. Before Jameson could emerge from the vehicle and with the engine still running, the gunman opened fire through the window with a 9 mm semi-automatic pistol and shot Jameson five times in the head and chest. His assassin escaped to a nearby getaway car. Jameson was rushed to Craigavon Area Hospital but died of his wounds minutes after his arrival. The RUC immediately began a murder inquiry. Within hours of the killing, the UVF Brigade Staff convened an emergency meeting at "the Eagle", their headquarters on the Shankill Road, where they compiled a list of all those they believed had been involved in Jameson's death and planned their retaliation against the LVF.

Among those who condemned the killing was Northern Ireland's First Minister David Trimble who released the following statement: "This is exactly the sort of thing we thought we had finally put behind us. I'm shocked by the news".

Jameson's funeral was held on 13 January at the Tartaraghan Parish Church and attended by several thousand mourners including Progressive Unionist Party (PUP) leaders David Ervine and Billy Hutchinson. Drumcree Orangeman Harold Gracey and Gary McMichael, the son of slain Ulster Defence Association (UDA) brigadier John McMichael, also attended as did local politicians representing the Ulster Unionist Party (UUP) and Democratic Unionist Party (DUP). The service was officiated by Reverend David Hilliard who spoke out against vengeance and described Jameson as a "man admired and loved by many" and who "had been so cruelly murdered". Jameson was buried in the adjacent churchyard.

== Aftermath ==
Despite Reverend Hilliard's pleas and LVF leader Mark "Swinger" Fulton's claim that his organisation had had nothing to do with the shooting, the UVF/LVF feud intensified. In the immediate aftermath members of Jameson's family were filmed angrily defacing LVF murals in Portadown. A month after Jameson's killing, two Protestant teenagers, Andrew Robb (19) and David McIlwaine (18), were savagely beaten and repeatedly stabbed to death in a country lane outside Tandragee, County Armagh by a local UVF gang. The young men were targeted by their UVF killers after they left a nightclub together in search of a party; they were believed to have been LVF members. However neither teenager was part of any paramilitary organisation and only Robb had tenuous links to the LVF. It was reported in the Belfast Telegraph that according to court hearings Robb had made disparaging remarks about Jameson's death. Two of the UVF men, Stephen Leslie Brown and Noel Dillon, were infuriated by the comments and afterwards Brown drove the victims to Druminure Road where he, Dillon and another man carried out the double killing. One of Jameson's brothers, Bobby was among the mourners at David McIlwaine's funeral. The West Belfast Brigade of the Ulster Defence Association, whose brigadier Johnny Adair was close to the LVF, briefly became involved in the feud after Adair attended Andrew Robb's funeral and joined LVF members at the Drumcree conflict. After the UVF tracked Jameson's killer down to the Oldpark area of Belfast and attempted to shoot him he was taken away under the protection of the West Belfast Brigade. The tit-for-tat killings went on intermittently until 2005 when the UVF made a final assault against the LVF, leaving four members dead and the LVF leadership with no alternative but to order its military units to permanently disband.

Richard Jameson's family have persistently denied that he was a UVF member. They maintain that he was a vigilante who was murdered in retaliation for the firm stand he had taken against drug dealing in the Portadown area. The late PUP leader David Ervine had expressed the same opinion the day after the killing by stating that "Mr. Jameson had been murdered by drug dealers masquerading as loyalists because he had been a bulwark in his community against dealers". Ervine had also described him as having been a "fine and honourable man, widely respected in the community". Northern Ireland security sources, however, have repeatedly named Jameson as the Mid-Ulster UVF commander. He is listed as a UVF member in the Cain: Sutton Index of Deaths, an online University of Ulster-sponsored project which chronicles the Northern Ireland conflict. It also emerged that for several days prior to his killing, he had been working at the Ballykinlar British Army base. Immediately after his murder by the LVF, Jameson's family began an anti-drug campaign in Portadown by putting up posters and handing out leaflets to passing motorists.
