= Eddie Copeland =

Irish republican

- Born: 1970 (age 55–56); Ardoyne, Belfast, Northern Ireland
- Military career
- Paramilitary: Provisional IRA
- Rank: Officer Commanding
- Nickname: Bubbles
- Units: 3rd Battalion, Belfast Brigade
- Conflict: The Troubles

Eddie Copeland is a prominent Irish republican from Belfast, Northern Ireland.

He joined the Provisional Irish Republican Army after the fatal shooting of his father by the British Army. John Copeland died on 31 October 1971, two days after being shot near his home in Strathroy Park in Ardoyne. John Copeland was not known to be affiliated with any paramilitary group.

Copeland has been the target of loyalist paramilitaries due to being an Officer Commanding of the Belfast Brigade's 3rd Battalion. In December 1996 he was seriously injured in an Ulster Defence Association car bomb attack at his home. He suffered leg and arm injuries but escaped with his life when loyalist paramilitaries planted a booby-trap beneath his car. The bomb had been made by Frankie Curry, who had been a leading figure in the Red Hand Commandos before becoming an independent dissident. Copeland later received £60,000 in compensation for the injuries he received.

On 8 February 1995, Andrew Clarke (27), a private in the British Army, was sentenced at Belfast Crown Court to ten years' imprisonment for the attempted murder of Copeland when he opened fire on mourners outside the home of deceased Provisional IRA Volunteer Thomas Begley in Belfast in October 1993.

On 19 May 1999, the Ministry of Defence was found guilty of negligence at Belfast High Court and Copeland was awarded £27,500 compensation for the injuries he received.

In 2001, Copeland was refused bail at Belfast High Court on charges of kidnapping, false imprisonment, assault and threatening to kill another person. The charges arose from the abduction of a man from a betting shop in Ardoyne. Copeland was later granted bail when the defendant retracted a sworn affidavit. The charges were withdrawn in August 2002.

In December 2004, Copeland's house was searched by the Police Service of Northern Ireland as part of an investigation into the Northern Bank robbery.

In September 2015, Copeland was arrested alongside Bobby Storey and Brian Gillen in relation to the murder of former Provisional IRA member Kevin McGuigan. All three were later released without charge.
