= Jackie McDonald =

Irish loyalist (born 1947)

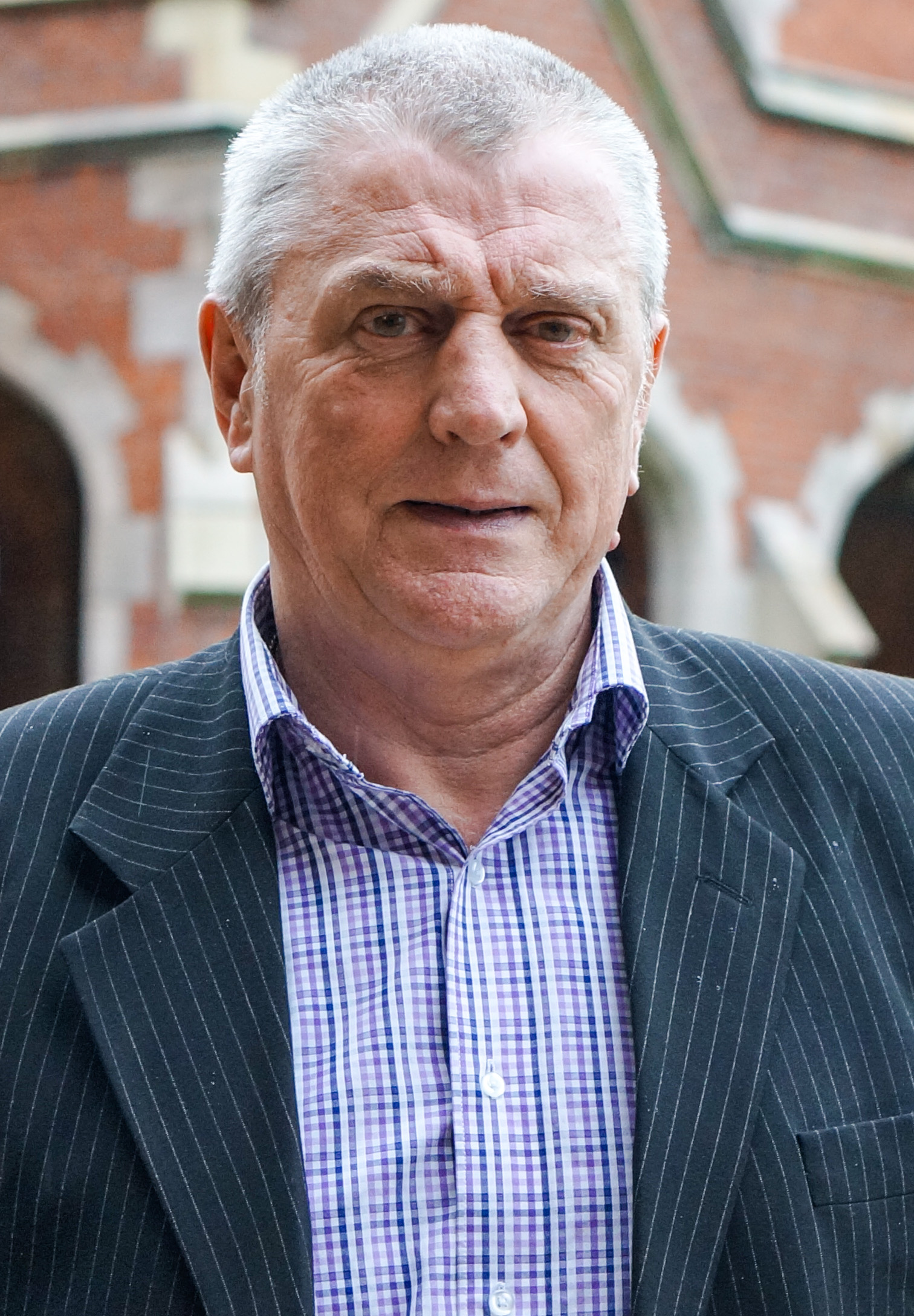
- McDonald in 2014
- Born: John McDonald; 2 August 1947 (age 79); Belfast, Northern Ireland
- Occupations: Dispatches manager Community worker organiser
- Employer(s): Balmoral Furniture Company; John McMichael Centre
- Known for: Ulster Defence Association (UDA) brigadier Ulster Political Research Group (UPRG) spokesman
- Title: Brigadier UDA South Belfast Brigade
- Term: 1988–1989; 1996-date
- Predecessor: John McMichael; Alex Kerr
- Successor: Alex Kerr incumbent
- Movement: Ulster Political Research Group
- Criminal charges: Extortion, blackmail and intimidation
- Criminal penalty: 10 years imprisonment
- Criminal status: Released in 1994

John "Jackie" McDonald (born 2 August 1947) is a Northern Irish loyalist. He is the incumbent brigadier for the proscribed terrorist group the Ulster Defence Association (UDA) for South Belfast, having been promoted to the rank by former UDA commander Andy Tyrie in 1988, following John McMichael's killing by the Provisional IRA in December 1987. He is also a member of the organisation's Inner Council and the spokesman for the Ulster Political Research Group (UPRG), the UDA's political advisory body.

== Ulster Defence Association ==
Born in Belfast, Northern Ireland into a Protestant family, McDonald attended Larkfield Secondary School later known as Balmoral High School in South Belfast. He lives in the south Belfast housing estate of Taughmonagh. His paramilitary activities have attracted considerable publicity from the media, and he was the subject of interviews by journalist Peter Taylor for the latter's book Loyalists. Described by journalist Rosie Cowan as the UDA's most powerful player, he is an outspoken critic of former Ulster Freedom Fighters' notorious brigadier, Johnny Adair.

He joined the UDA in 1972 about a year after it was formed in Belfast as an umbrella organisation for loyalist vigilante groups. These groups, such as the Woodvale Defence Association (WDA) and Shankill Defence Association (SDA), had sprung up in loyalist areas following the outbreak of The Troubles in the late 1960s as a means of protecting their local communities from attacks by nationalists. He was a member of the Taughmonagh C Battalion South Belfast Brigade.

He was already a senior UDA member when he played a part in the Ulster Workers Council Strike, helping people on his south Belfast housing estate obtain food, medicine, transport and other necessities during the general strike which had brought Northern Ireland to a standstill in May 1974. At this time he held a job as dispatches manager for the Balmoral Furniture Company in the Shankill Road. It had been the target of a Provisional IRA bomb in December 1971, in which four people had died, including two infants. According to author Ian S. Wood, McDonald was almost killed during the strike when Military Police fired upon the hijacked vehicle he was driving in a chase along the Lisburn Road into Sandy Row. When receiving his social security payments during the strike, McDonald received a military salute from his boss when he walked into the latter's office wearing his complete UDA combat uniform.

== Brigadier ==
In the mid-1980s, McDonald became part of UDA "fundraiser" Jim Craig's large protection racket. In 1988, just after the death of UDA's South Belfast brigadier John McMichael, who was blown up in a booby-trap car bomb planted by the Provisional IRA outside his home in Lisburn, Supreme Commander Andy Tyrie promoted McDonald to the rank of brigadier. He subsequently assumed command of McMichael's South Belfast brigade having previously served as his second-in-command. Described by Peter Taylor as an "effective and popular commander", many people, however considered McDonald to have been one of Craig's "henchmen in the latter's profitable racketeering business." According to Steve Bruce Tyrie's appointment of McDonald as Brigadier helped to hasten Tyrie's own downfall due to the distaste with which McDonald was then regarded by a number of leading UDA figures. Due to his reputation as a racketeer and his close association with the widely disliked Craig and his equally loathed deputy and minder Artie Fee, a number of UDA modernisers, who were the chief critics of Tyrie, released statements to both the local media and BBC Newsnight condemning McDonald's appointment.

McDonald admitted to Taylor: "Through not being able to get a job anywhere else and not being able to look after my own family and being part of the organisation that needed the money, eventually I did [join Craig] yes." The same year McDonald took over the South Belfast brigade, Andy Tyrie resigned as UDA commander and James Craig was put permanently out of the picture. The latter was shot dead in the "Bunch of Grapes" pub in east Belfast by two masked gunmen from the UDA (using their cover name "Ulster Freedom Fighters") in October 1988 for "treason". It was claimed by younger elements within the UDA that he had set up John McMichael to be targeted by the IRA.

McDonald was arrested in 1989, and sentenced to 10 years imprisonment in the Maze Prison for extortion, blackmail and intimidation in January 1990. Following his imprisonment he was replaced as brigadier by Alex Kerr. He was released in 1994.

== Return to power ==
Returning to his role as brigadier after Kerr defected to the Loyalist Volunteer Force (LVF) group which was founded by Billy Wright in 1996, McDonald found himself in 1997 facing the possibility of a loyalist feud with the local Ulster Volunteer Force (UVF), with whom he had previously been on good terms. In June 1997, the son of murdered UDA man, James Curtis Moorehead, shot and killed his father's killer, the UVF's Robert "Basher" Bates (who was also part of the Shankill Butchers gang, led by Lenny Murphy), leading to the Shankill Road UDA "exiling" the young killer to Taughmonagh. UVF members began to prowl McDonald's Taughmonagh stronghold looking for the killer, and a clash between the Donegall Pass UVF and the Sandy Row UDA looked imminent as relations deteriorated both in South Belfast and throughout Northern Ireland as a whole. McDonald did not want a war with the UVF and, according to authors Henry McDonald and Jim Cusack, ultimately negotiated a settlement whereby the killer would be housed on the edge of Taugmonagh and told to keep a low profile.

The UDA gave its support to the Belfast Agreement in 1998 although McDonald was one of three Inner Council members – the others being John Gregg and Billy McFarland – who was less convinced about its merits, particularly the prospect of Sinn Féin entering any power-sharing executive. Nonetheless McDonald did not advocate a return to armed struggle and in late 1999 when it became clear that a feud between the UVF and LVF was about to begin he joined fellow brigadiers McFarland, Gregg and Jim Gray in announcing that the UDA would not be getting involved. Such sentiments were not echoed by west Belfast brigadier Johnny Adair however as he saw the LVF as close allies and resented the UVF.

== Clashes with Johnny Adair ==
McDonald grew further apart from Adair as the year 2000 progressed. Whilst supporting the Orange Order's desire to march through nationalist areas, McDonald was a lot less enthusiastic than Adair about getting involved in the Drumcree conflict. He had grown weary of seeing the mainstream unionist parties seek to ally themselves to loyalist paramilitaries when it was expedient only to sever any links as soon as the relationship no longer suited them. Similarly he was unconvinced by a series of vandalism attacks on loyalist areas in Belfast in late June by three carloads of "republicans", feeling that the missile throwing youths were actually members of Adair's C Company sent to stir up sectarian hatred and win support for Adair's Drumcree strategy.

McDonald was one of a number of brigadiers to accept Adair's invitation to a "Loyalist Day of Culture" on the Shankill Road on 19 August 2000 but was shocked to find that C Company had used the day to drive UVF members and their families from the road, even attacking the homes of such UVF "elder statesmen" as Gusty Spence and Winston Churchill Rea. At the culmination of the day, McDonald and other brigadiers, as well as Deputy Lord Mayor of Belfast Frank McCoubrey, were brought onto a makeshift stage where C Company members emerged and fired machine guns into the air in a show of strength.

McDonald however retained his earlier attitude towards feuding with the C Company UDA, and along with McFarland and Gray, told his men to leave the Shankill that evening. McDonald promptly contacted his opposite number in the South Belfast UVF and concluded a pact that their members would not attack each other. Even when the initial feud cooled, the enmity between McDonald and Adair continued to simmer and in Inner Council meetings the two frequently clashed as, according to one veteran loyalist, "Jackie was the only one with the balls to stand up to him". Nonetheless when Adair was released from prison on 15 May 2002, McDonald, arguing that he deserved a second chance and hoping that his return to prison may have mellowed him, was one of the brigadiers to appear at Adair's Boundary Way home and welcome him back in front of the television cameras.

The public show of bonhomie between McDonald and Adair did not result in improved relations in the long term. On 14 September 2002, East Belfast LVF man Stephen Warnock was killed by the Red Hand Commando and immediately afterwards Adair, seeing an opportunity to strike back at a rival, went to his family home to inform visiting LVF members that the killing had been actually ordered by Jim Gray. On Adair's encouragement, an LVF hit team waited for Gray to appear at Warnock's house where, after he paid his respects to the family, he was shot in the face as he left. Gray was seriously injured but survived the attack.

McDonald called a crisis meeting of brigadiers, including Adair, at Sandy Row but it failed to reach a conclusion as Adair denied involvement in the attack on Gray. As soon as the meeting was over, Adair drove to Ballysillan in north Belfast to meet with allies in the LVF, although he was unaware that a mainstream UDA team were following him and recording his movements. When McDonald was told about this second meeting he secured agreement with the other brigadiers that Adair should be expelled from the UDA. Tension simmered for the next few months with little real fighting although McDonald threw a ring of steel around his Taughmonagh stronghold and even obtained an air raid siren to be sounded if any C Company members attempted to enter the estate.

The killing of John Gregg and his associate Rab Carson by C Company in Sailortown on 1 February 2003 however finally led to a showdown, with McDonald taking charge of the anti-Adair faction. McDonald quickly got word to A and B Company of the West Belfast UDA, covering the Highfield estate and Woodvale areas of the Greater Shankill and nominally under Adair's command, that Adair was to be removed and secured the loyalty of these two groups. He also told them to set up an office on the Shankill's Heather Street Social Club as a safe house where members of C Company could defect back to the mainstream UDA.

At around 1 a.m. on 6 February 2003, about 100 heavily armed UDA members invaded the lower Shankill and set upon the twenty or so members of C Company who had remained loyal to Adair. For his part Adair fled the scene with his family and his close ally John White, ending his spell in charge on the Shankill. Several weeks later McDonald organised a "battle of the bands" (competition between loyalist flute bands) at which he made it clear that unity had been re-established. He then received a standing ovation from those present as, marching behind a masked man carrying an AK 47, McDonald led the other five brigadiers onto the stage.

When asked by Peter Taylor whether he had any regrets about his past involvements, McDonald replied:

I have certainly. I would say without a shadow of doubt the worst thing that ever happened to South Belfast, John McMichael and myself especially, was that Jim Craig ever had anything to do with our organisation.

== Subsequent activity ==
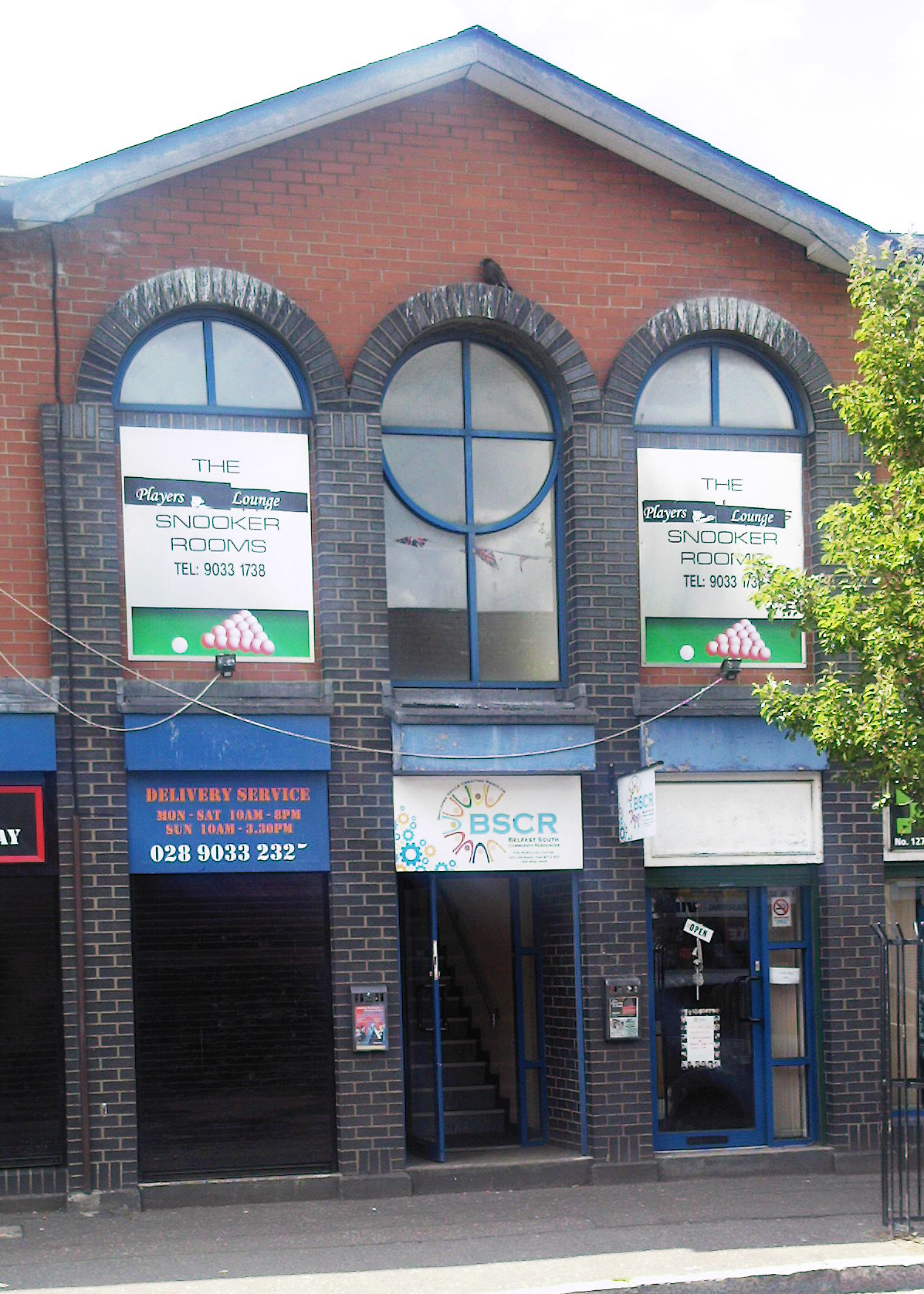
The John McMichael Centre in Sandy Row, Belfast, where McDonald works as a full-time organiser

McDonald remains a member of the UDA's Inner Council and is also the spokesman for its political advisory body, the Ulster Political Research Group (UPRG). Politically he always considered former Ulster Democratic Party (UDP) spokesman Davy Adams to be his main political advisor. He has in recent years turned his attention to community-building activities and helping former loyalist prisoners as a full-time organiser of the John McMichael Centre in Belfast's Sandy Row district, named after his deceased friend and former comrade.

Beginning in 2003, McDonald has held peace talks with Irish president Mary McAleese and her husband Martin. In 2004, he was part of a loyalist delegation which met with Taoiseach Bertie Ahern in Dublin.

In 2010, to the surprise of many people, he stated that the Orange Order should walk away from the Garvaghy Road dispute unless the residents of the contentious parade route give their consent for the march to take place. He also criticised republicans and Sinn Féin for manipulating the parades issue.

McDonald met Sinn Féin president Gerry Adams in person for the first time in June 2010, although the two had spoken previously over the telephone. The meeting, which went well, took place at the family home of Harry Haggan, a loyalist community worker who had just died. McDonald and Adams had both called at the Haggan home to offer their condolences to the deceased man's family.

On 18 May 2011, McDonald led a delegation of UDA brigadiers to the ceremony at the Irish National War Memorial Gardens in Islandbridge, Dublin where Queen Elizabeth II laid a wreath during her three-day visit to the Republic of Ireland. McDonald, who said he was proud and felt honoured to have participated in the event made the following statements to the Irish Times:

It shows that there is a relationship and an association between Northern Ireland and the Republic. People need to be aware of the similarities and the sacrifices, especially in the wars. I think it is a time for them to come together and appreciate each other's pasts and give ourselves all a better future. I always thought "The Troubles" would never end in my lifetime, and in many ways they still haven't really, but there is a kind of peace. We need to build on that.

He travels on an Irish passport. His picture and details were published on far right website Redwatch when he attended an anti-racist protest in 2009.

Commenting on Martin McGuinness running for election in the 2011 Irish presidential election, McDonald stated that Unionists had nothing to fear from it and any Unionist that opposed it was hypocritical.

In October 2011 after accepting an invitation to attend an event in Belfast City Hall to unveil a new portrait of famous Irish republican and trade union leader James Connolly he was later forced to withdraw his attendance at the event. The reason for the withdrawal was attributed to an angry backlash from senior UDA leaders angry at the Sinn Féin mayor of Belfast Niall Ó Donnghaile's decision to remove photos of the Royal Family from his office.

Criticising young loyalists in November 2011, he suggested they were too interested in drinking alcohol and using drugs than caring about their future. In a further verbal attack, he lambasted some loyalist band members for attacking each other when drunk and when there are no Catholics in the vicinity.

To some surprise McDonald in 2012 labelled The Twelfth as "the worst day of my year". He cited the excess consumption of alcohol by followers and supporters of the parades in Belfast causing violence on occasions. He also noted that if the parades had an outward route only without having a return route the potential for disorder would be decreased. The comments were condemned by other loyalists and were said to have driven a further wedge between the wider UDA and its North Antrim and Londonderry Brigade, which had been the source of some dissident activity.

McDonald is the most senior UDA brigadier, and author Jon Moran credits him with restoring order to the organisation due to his prominent role in bringing about the downfall of Johnny Adair. He and the South Belfast Brigade have long taken a hard-line stance against drugs and drug-dealing in south Belfast. He confirmed this is an interview with Ian S. Wood: "We do take as hard a line as we can in South Belfast".

Other offices
| Preceded by John McMichael | Ulster Defence Association South Belfast Brigadier; 1988–1989 | Succeeded by Alex Kerr |
| Preceded by Alex Kerr | Ulster Defence Association South Belfast Brigadier; 1996–present | Incumbent |
