= Murder of Michael McGoldrick =

1996 sectarian murder during The Troubles

Michael McGoldrick
- McGoldrick on 5 July 1996
- Born: 18 June 1965; Glasgow, Scotland
- Died: 8 July 1996 (aged 31); Aghalee, Northern Ireland
- Cause of death: Shooting
- Education: Queen's University Belfast
- Spouse: Sadie McGoldrick (m. 1987)
- Children: 2

On 8 July 1996, Michael John McGoldrick, a 31‑year‑old Catholic taxi driver, was murdered by the Ulster Volunteer Force (UVF) during The Troubles in Northern Ireland. The sectarian murder took place during heightened tensions around the Drumcree standoff, and was intended as a warning against blocking the Protestant Orange Order from marching through the Catholic Garvaghy area of Portadown. It was carried out by members of the Mid‑Ulster UVF unit led by Billy Wright, which soon after became the Loyalist Volunteer Force (LVF).

== Biography ==
Michael John McGoldrick was born on 18 June 1965 in Glasgow, Scotland, the only child of Bridie and Mick, who were from Northern Ireland. He worked as a psychiatric nurse until a back injury led him to driving work. He met Sadie, a Northern Irish nurse, at a dance in Scotland, and they married in 1987. They had a daughter in 1989 and Sadie was six months pregnant with a son when McGoldrick was murdered. He was living and working as a taxi driver in Lurgan, Northern Ireland, to support his studies and had graduated with a degree in politics and English from Queen's University on 5 July 1996.

== Murder ==
In July 1996, the Drumcree standoff increased tensions between Protestant and Catholic communities in Northern Ireland, particularly in the Craigavon area. The Troubles saw more than 3,600 people killed over a 30-year period, most of them civilians. On 7 July, members of the Protestant Orange Order were blocked by police from marching down the mainly-Catholic Garvaghy Road in Portadown. The yearly march had been contentious, with Catholics describing it as sectarian and supremacist, and it had been accompanied by violence in previous years. Thousands of loyalists gathered at Drumcree Church and attacked the police who were blocking the march. Among them was Billy Wright from Portadown, leader of the Mid-Ulster Brigade of the Ulster Volunteer Force (UVF). Wright was seen at Drumcree in the company of Harold Gracey, head of the Portadown Orangemen. Gracey had thanked Wright and his men for their role in supporting the Orangemen the year before.

In response to the march being blocked, the Mid-Ulster UVF decided to take action and unilaterally break the group's ceasefire. They originally planned to kidnap three Catholic priests from a parochial house and kill them unless the march was allowed to go ahead. Instead, they decided to kill Catholic taxi drivers. Because of previous murders during the Troubles, the province's taxi services had become informally segregated and drivers tended to serve only their own communities. A taxi was ordered in the late evening from the Minicabs depot in Lurgan under the name "Lavery" going from the local cinema to Aghagallon, and McGoldrick responded to the call. When the radio controller got no response at 12:45 am on 8 July, he assumed McGoldrick had clocked off for the night. Early the next morning, McGoldrick (aged 31) was found slumped over the wheel of his taxi on Featherbed Road, an isolated country lane. He had been shot five times in the head.

== Aftermath ==
The murder drew significant attention from regional and national media, as it had the appearance of paramilitary-style execution during a ceasefire. Security sources and loyalist sources say the killing was ordered by the Mid-Ulster UVF leader Billy Wright, as a warning against blocking the Drumcree march.

The Ulster Volunteer Force stood down the brigade a month later, and Wright formed the Loyalist Volunteer Force. The splinter group engaged in a feud with the UVF, its final murders being of UVF members and other loyalists. Wright was killed less than 18 months after McGoldrick's death by the Irish National Liberation Army in Long Kesh prison, and the group disbanded in August 1998.

Clifford George McKeown

Clifford George McKeown was found guilty of McGoldrick's murder in March 2003. He was represented in court by former DUP member Jim Allister QC. McKeown was already serving 12 years for gun possession at the time of the trial. After sentencing, Allister said McKeown would be appealing against the conviction.

Part of the evidence in his trial was interviews McKeown had given to journalist Nick Martin-Clark while in prison in 1999. McKeown told him that the killing was a "birthday present" for Billy Wright. He said that two youths assisted in the murder. They ordered the taxi, and one of them asked McGoldrick to stop at the roadside to let him urinate. McKeown, who had allegedly followed with his lights switched off, moved close to the back of the taxi and shot McGoldrick.

After the guilty verdict was delivered, McGoldrick's father said he felt no bitterness towards his son's killer. "The hurt in our country has to stop," he said. The murder weapon was found in 2006 in the possession of William James Fulton, who is currently serving a life sentence for murder and orchestrating terrorism. McKeown was released from prison in August 2024 on "humanitarian grounds", and died on 4 February 2025, aged 65.
