= Balmoral High School =

School in Belfast, Northern Ireland

Coordinates: 54.5588°N 5.9994°W

Balmoral High School was a secondary school in Belfast, Northern Ireland. It was established by a merger of Deramore High School and Larkfield High School (founded in 1946). The school was managed by the Belfast Education and Library Board (BELB). The school opened in September 1996 ( The new building was opened in January 2002, not the school) and closed in August 2008, due to falling pupil numbers. It had been built as an education 'pathfinder' for the private finance initiative (PFI).

The school's design was almost identical to Wellington College Belfast, however the shape of the building was slightly different.

The old Larkfield building was situated adjacent to the new building occupied by Balmoral. The PFI was structured so that the old school site and land was used to build a large housing development and building the new school next to this site.

The BELB are tied to a 25-year contract, which was inflation-proofed, and in 2006 the BELB paid more than £370,000 to use the school. Even discounting inflation, a minimum of £7.4m will have to be paid out over the remaining period of the contract, whether the school remains empty or not. At present, their Regional Training Unit occupies part of the Balmoral building. The project was described, by the Belfast Telegraph, as "botched".
