= Combined Loyalist Military Command =

Pro-UK Northern Irish paramilitary

The Combined Loyalist Military Command (CLMC) is an umbrella body for loyalist paramilitary groups in Northern Ireland set up in the early 1990s, recalling the earlier Ulster Army Council and Ulster Loyalist Central Co-ordinating Committee.

Bringing together the leaderships of the Ulster Defence Association, the Ulster Volunteer Force and the Red Hand Commando, the CLMC sought to ensure that the groups would work towards the same goals. The group was made up of a number of 'Liaison Officers' who were senior figures from the paramilitary groups themselves, as well as from the Ulster Democratic Party and the loyalist Progressive Unionist Party. The UDP was made up of representatives from UDA and the PUP was made up of representatives from both the RHC and UVF.

== 1991 Ceasefire ==
The CLMC first tested the idea of a ceasefire in 1991 when it called a halt to all action from 29 April to 4 July of that year. The only breach of the 10-week ceasefire was the killing by the Ulster Freedom Fighters of Eddie Fullerton, a Sinn Féin Councillor in Buncrana, County Donegal. The UDA justified the killing, insisting that the ceasefire only applied within Northern Ireland. The ceasefire indicated that the CLMC was open to the possibility of ending its campaign and a line of negotiation was opened afterwards with Robin Eames, the head of the Church of Ireland.

== Paramilitary action ==
The only paramilitary action claimed in the name of the CLMC was a rocket attack on Crumlin Road Prison on 13 December 1991, in retaliation for an IRA bomb in the prison on 24 November 1991 which killed two loyalist prisoners. An RPG-7 was fired at the canteen block where republican prisoners were having their evening meal but the rocket bounced off a window grille and failed to explode.

== 1994 Ceasefire ==
After a long process of consultation with members and activists across Northern Ireland, the CLMC called a ceasefire on 13 October 1994, bringing loyalists fully into the peace process. The ceasefire was announced at a press conference at Fernhill House in the Glencairn area of the Shankill. Former UVF commander and PUP politician Gusty Spence read out the ceasefire statement which included an apology for the innocent victims of loyalist violence.

"In all sincerity, we offer to the loved ones of all innocent victims over the past twenty-five years, abject and true remorse. No words of ours will compensate for the intolerable suffering they have undergone during the conflict."

== Drumcree ==
The ceasefire, however, proved difficult to maintain and in 1996 the CLMC was forced to distance itself from the murder of Catholic taxi driver, Michael McGoldrick by the UVF's Mid-Ulster Brigade. They were further embarrassed by television pictures that year showing loyalists at Drumcree Church being led against the security forces by Billy Wright, at the time the leader of the Mid-Ulster UVF. Following the unsanctioned killing of a Catholic taxi driver by his brigade, Wright, along with the Portadown unit of the Mid-Ulster UVF, was stood down by the UVF's Brigade Staff (Belfast leadership). Wright was soon expelled from the UVF for his renegade actions along with a number of his followers who soon reconstituted as the Loyalist Volunteer Force, continuing without ceasefire.

Despite no longer having full control of Loyalism, the CLMC carried on and supported the signing of the Belfast Agreement. However, since then the CLMC has effectively ceased to exist as the UVF and UDA were embroiled in a loyalist feud over Johnny Adair and commitment to the Agreement has wavered. Overall control of Loyalism has largely been lost to the CLMC and, whilst it is still theoretically maintained, it is no longer the important body that it once was.

The subsequent Loyalist Commission (LC) represented the political work of the new McMichael-ite UDA politicos, known as the Ulster Political Research Group (UPRG), which followed the now defunct UDP, and the David Ervine-inspired PUP. Led by the UPRG's East Belfast faction, Frankie Gallagher, and Dawn Purvis the new PUP leader, the testing post-Ervine vacuum murders by the CIRA-RIRA alliance were rendered ineffective when even the now larger hard-line Loyalist Volunteer Force refused to retaliate to several murders in March 2009.

At the Belfast peace rally of 12 March 2009 a community-led body calling itself the Combined Loyalists for Peace appeared. Quoted in the Irish Independent they stressed that the loyalist communities had a peace strategy and would stick to it. UDA leader Jackie McDonald confirmed the group's thoughts in a BBC interview when he said loyalists would not be goaded into reaction adding that "clowns" would not spoil the loyalist peace strategy. In a carefully choreographed move Frankie Gallagher met Belfast mayor, Tom Hartley of Sinn Féin in public that same day. Three levels of formerly hard-line loyalism were evident for the first time and in public – the community, the military, and the political. All were showing overt support for no return to violence.

Subsequently, and merely weeks after the dissident republican murders, the groups which had made up the CLMC made separate announcements to the media that arms had been decommissioned. Dawn Purvis, now leader of the PUP mentioned above, quoting the input of influential liberal loyalists such as Billy Mitchell and Billy McCaughey, announced on behalf of the UVF and the RHC that all weapons had been put beyond use. Frankie Gallagher, speaking for the UDA/UFF via the UPRG, stated that their process was underway. This was confirmed by General de Chastelain hours later.

The CLMC set out to see that any conflict resolution initiatives by Irish republicans in the peace process were matched by loyalist groups, and nearly 20 years after its creation, and despite the fact that 'in essence' it no longer existed, it finally and successfully achieved its goals.

== Bibliography ==
- H. McDonald & J. Cusack, UDA – Inside the Heart of Loyalist Terror, Dublin, Penguin Ireland, 2004
