= Mark Fulton (loyalist) =

Northern Irish loyalist (c. 1961–2002)

- Mark "Swinger" Fulton
- Born: c. 1961; Portadown, County Armagh, Northern Ireland
- Died: 10 June 2002 (aged 42); Maghaberry Prison, County Antrim, Northern Ireland
- Cause of death: Apparent suicide by hanging
- Resting place: Kernan Cemetery, Portadown
- Other name: "Swinger"
- Known for: Leader of Loyalist Volunteer Force from 1997 to 2002
- Spouse(s): Louise Fulton; 2 children
- Parent(s): Jim and Sylvia (née Prentice) Fulton
- Military career
- Paramilitaries: Ulster Volunteer Force (c. 1976–1996); Loyalist Volunteer Force (1996–2002)
- Unit: Mid-Ulster Brigade (UVF)
- Conflict: The Troubles

Mark Fulton (c. 1961 – 10 June 2002) was a Northern Irish loyalist. He was the leader of the Loyalist Volunteer Force (LVF), having taken over its command following the assassination of Billy Wright in the Maze Prison in 1997 by members of the Irish National Liberation Army (INLA).

Fulton was alleged by journalist Susan McKay to have carried out a dozen sectarian killings in the 1990s. He also allegedly organized the murder of a Catholic lawyer, Rosemary Nelson, in 1999 while he was out of prison on compassionate leave. In 2002, he was found hanged in his cell at Maghaberry Prison, an apparent suicide. He was awaiting trial having been charged with conspiracy to murder a man from a rival loyalist paramilitary organisation. At the time of his death, Fulton was married with two children.

== Early years ==
Mark Fulton was born in Portadown, County Armagh in 1961, one of the children of Jim Fulton, a former British soldier who worked as a window cleaner. His mother, Sylvia (née Prentice), came from a family of wealthy car dealers. Fulton grew up in the working-class Protestant Killycomain area.

Following the outbreak of the Troubles in the late 1960s, Fulton's father became a member of the Ulster Defence Association (UDA). According to journalist Susan McKay, senior Ulster Volunteer Force (UVF) members Robin "the Jackal" Jackson and Harris Boyle were frequent visitors to the Fulton home in the early 1970s. Jackson, one of the alleged leaders of the gang which carried out the 1974 Dublin car bombings, became the commander of the UVF's Mid-Ulster Brigade in July 1975. Four days later, Boyle was blown up after placing a bomb on the Miami Showband's minibus after the band was stopped at a bogus checkpoint by UVF gunmen, and three band members shot dead.

== Ulster Volunteer Force ==
Fulton left school early and promptly joined the Mid-Ulster UVF, being sworn in at the age of 15. According to Sean McPhilemy, Fulton's early activity included being part of the UVF gang that opened fire on a Craigavon mobile sweetshop on 28 March 1991, killing two teenaged girls and one man, all Catholics. The attack was allegedly planned by Robin Jackson.

In the early 1990s, Billy Wright, also from Portadown, took over command of the UVF Mid-Ulster Brigade from Jackson. The Mid-Ulster Brigade, founded in 1972 by its first commander, Billy Hanna, operated mainly in the Lurgan and Portadown areas. Fulton soon became Wright's closest associate and right-hand man and had an "extreme fixation and obsession over Wright"; he even had an image of Wright tattooed over his heart.

Fulton was alleged to have perpetrated twelve sectarian killings in the 1990s, and reportedly was implicated in many other attacks. His victims were often questioned about their religion prior to their killings, and sometimes they were killed in front of their families. He was very violent and had a quick temper. Wright was the only person who was able to control him. A Royal Ulster Constabulary (RUC) detective who knew both of them said that whenever they were stopped by the police in the 1990s, Wright was "coolness personified", while Fulton would rage, shout and make threats.

Although he was brought up in the Church of Ireland religion, Fulton was a follower of the Reverend Ian Paisley, founder and moderator of the Free Presbyterian Church of Ulster. In appearance Fulton was heavily tattooed and was known for his habit of always wearing a waistcoat.

The Mid-Ulster Brigade called themselves the "Brat Pack", which journalist Martin O'Hagan of the Sunday World altered to "Rat Pack". After the nickname of "King Rat" was given to Wright by local Ulster Defence Association (UDA) commander Robert John Kerr as a form of pub bantering, O'Hagan took to describing Wright by that term. This soubriquet was thereafter used by the media, much to Wright's fury. This led him to issue threats against O'Hagan and all journalists who worked for the newspaper. The unit initially welcomed the Combined Loyalist Military Command ceasefire in October 1994; however, things were to change drastically over the next few years.

== Loyalist Volunteer Force ==
Following the order given in August 1996 by the UVF's Brigade Staff (Belfast leadership) for Wright and the Portadown unit of the Mid-Ulster Brigade to stand down, Fulton remained loyal to Wright and defied the order. This came after the Mid-Ulster UVF's killing of a Catholic taxi driver, Michael McGoldrick, while the UVF were on ceasefire. Fulton was close to Alex Kerr, the sometime South Belfast brigadier of the Ulster Defence Association who had become an ally of Wright during the Drumcree conflict and had been expelled by the UDA at the same time Wright was removed from the UVF. After Wright defied a UVF order to leave Northern Ireland, he formed the breakaway Loyalist Volunteer Force (LVF), taking the members of the officially-disbanded Portadown unit with him, including Fulton. Fulton acted as an adviser to Kerr during the emergence of the LVF as a separate group and told both Kerr and Wright that the LVF should seek a closer relationship with the UDA in order to more fully oppose the UVF.

Fulton, as Wright's deputy, assumed effective control of the LVF when Wright was sent to the Maze Prison in March 1997, and his relationship with Kerr, who had relocated to the LVF's Portadown stronghold, soon ended. Fulton, who continued to advocate a closer alliance with the UDA, reasoned that the group would be more prepared to co-operate with the LVF if their dissident former brigadier was not involved and so before long Fulton and his cousin Gary, also a leading LVF member, began to threaten Kerr, resulting in the Kerr family fleeing to England. Not long after this, on 13 May, Fulton was said by McPhilemy to have been responsible for the abduction and murder of 61 year-old civil servant and GAA official Séan Brown, who was kidnapped in Bellaghy before being murdered in Randalstown.

When Wright was shot dead by the INLA in December 1997, in a prison van while being taken to the Maze's visitor block, Fulton assumed control of the LVF. In the immediate aftermath he attempted to minimise local violence as youths sympathetic to Wright amassed on Portadown's loyalist estates preparing to riot in protest at the killing of their leader and local hero. Unlike Wright, Fulton had always been on good personal terms with UDA chief Johnny Adair as the two had socialized together on and off since the early 1990s. The alliance was sealed soon afterwards when Mark and Gary Fulton arrived at the Maze prison, ostensibly to visit a friend, but instead sat at Adair's table in the visiting room. Fulton was deeply affected by Wright's death, and reportedly spent many nights alone by his grave.

The LVF published a magazine, Leading the Way. The special 1998 edition, commemorating Billy Wright, was edited by and written almost exclusively by Fulton. In an article, "Have Faith", he advised loyalists to refuse the notion of extending the hand of friendship to "those who are genetically violent, inherent in the Catholic Church, a church as sly as a fox and vicious as a tiger", citing historic examples of persecution of Protestants by Catholics. In May 1998, the LVF called a ceasefire. It was accepted by the Northern Ireland Office six months later.

== Rosemary Nelson killing ==
Fulton was arrested in 1998 after shooting at an off-duty soldier in Portadown. He was heavily intoxicated at the time and sentenced to four years imprisonment. While he was out on compassionate leave in early 1999, he allegedly organised the killing of Catholic lawyer Rosemary Nelson. During the Drumcree standoff, Nelson had represented the Catholic Portadown residents who opposed the Orange Order's march through the predominantly nationalist Garvaghy area. She was blown up by a car bomb on 15 March 1999 outside her home in Lurgan. The bomb was allegedly made by a man from the Belfast UDA but planted by Fulton's associates acting on his orders.

Colin Port, the Deputy Chief Constable of Norfolk Constabulary who headed the investigation into her death, said "without question" Fulton was the person who had masterminded her killing. Although he was back in prison at the time, he was excited when he heard the news of her death on the radio. He was linked to the killing by police informers but not forensics. It was also revealed that prior to his own death, Wright had threatened to kill Nelson in the belief she had defended IRA volunteers. Fulton was released from prison in April 2001.

== Death ==
On 10 June 2002, Fulton, who was being held on remand in HMP Maghaberry since December 2001, was found dead in his prison cell with a leather belt around his neck. Fulton was found on his bed rather than hanging from the ceiling, leading to speculation that his death had been accidentally caused by autoerotic asphyxiation. Friends claimed he had expressed suicidal thoughts due to both his failure to recover from his close friend Wright's death, as well as his fears that he was suffering from stomach cancer. Some reports suggested his unstable mental state had seen him stood down as leader several weeks before his death, with the LVF's power base transferred to Belfast. He was also afraid that rival loyalist inmates wished to kill him inside the prison.

At the time of his death, Fulton had been awaiting trial, having been charged with conspiracy to murder Rodney Jennett, a member of a rival loyalist paramilitary organisation, in connection with an ongoing feud. He left behind his wife, Louise and two children, Lee and Alana. His funeral was attended by 500 mourners, including a number of senior loyalist paramilitaries, including Johnny Adair and John White, who acted as pallbearers alongside Fulton's brother Jim and son, Lee. After a service at St Columba's Parish Church, he was interred in Kernan Cemetery in Portadown.
