= UVF Mid-Ulster Brigade =

Mid-Ulster Brigade
- Active: 1972–present day
- Allegiance: Ulster Volunteer Force
- Headquarters: Lurgan and Portadown
- Main actions during The Troubles: Dublin and Monaghan bombings Miami Showband killings Bleary Darts Club shooting Donnelly's Bar and Kay's Tavern attacks Reavey and O'Dowd killings Hillcrest Bar bombing Charlemont pub attacks 1991 Cappagh killings 1991 Drumbeg killings 1991 Craigavon killings

Commanders
- Notable commanders: Billy Hanna (1972–1975); Robin Jackson (1975–early 1990s); Billy Wright (early 1990s–1996); Richard Jameson (?-2000)

UVF Mid-Ulster Brigade formed part of the loyalist paramilitary Ulster Volunteer Force in Northern Ireland. The brigade was established in Lurgan, County Armagh in 1972 by its first commander Billy Hanna. The unit operated mainly around the Lurgan and Portadown areas. Subsequent leaders of the brigade were Robin Jackson, known as "The Jackal", and Billy Wright. The Mid-Ulster Brigade carried out many attacks, mainly in Northern Ireland, especially in the South Armagh area, but it also extended its operational reach into the Republic of Ireland. Two of the most notorious attacks in the history of the Troubles were carried out by the Mid-Ulster Brigade: the 1974 Dublin and Monaghan bombings and the Miami Showband killings in 1975. Members of the Mid-Ulster Brigade were part of the Glenanne gang which the Pat Finucane Centre has since linked to at least 87 lethal attacks in the 1970s.

The brigade has been active since 1972. The Portadown unit along with the brigade's leader Billy Wright was officially stood down on 2 August 1996 by the UVF's Brigade Staff (its Belfast leadership) following the brigade's killing of a Catholic taxi driver during a UVF ceasefire. The brigade, however, continued to function in the mid-Ulster area. In 2000–2001 the Mid-Ulster Brigade was involved in an acrimonious feud with the Loyalist Volunteer Force (LVF), the group set up by Billy Wright. It was during this feud that Mid-Ulster brigade commander Richard Jameson was shot dead by the LVF.

== Beginnings ==
The Mid-Ulster Brigade was established by senior Ulster Volunteer Force (UVF) member William Henry Wilson Hanna, known as "Billy", who sat on its Brigade Staff, which was the UVF's ruling council based on the Shankill Road in Belfast. Hanna served as a sergeant and permanent staff instructor (PSI) in the Ulster Defence Regiment (UDR), and was a decorated war hero who won the Military Medal for gallantry in the Korean War when he served in the Royal Ulster Rifles. Hanna started the UVF brigade in his home town of Lurgan in 1972 with the full endorsement of imprisoned UVF leader Gusty Spence. Spence had spent four months out of prison in 1972 when his false kidnapping was staged by the UVF in July after he had been given leave by prison authorities to attend his daughter's wedding. During his period of freedom he had restructured the UVF on its original 1913 lines by adding brigades, battalions, companies, platoons, and sections. He also managed to procure weaponry. On 23 October 1972 an armed UVF gang raided a UDR/Territorial Army depot in Lurgan and stole a large cache of sophisticated guns and ammunition. Spence was recaptured by the British Army and sent back to prison in November. By 1972 the Provisional IRA's bombing campaign had escalated in its intensity, which triggered a violent response from loyalist paramilitary groups such as the UVF and Ulster Defence Association (UDA). When the religious and political conflict that came to be known as "the Troubles" had broken out in the late 1960s, unionists had immediately formed vigilante groups, ostensibly to protect loyalist areas from nationalist attacks. These had gone on to merge into larger umbrella paramilitary organisations.

Hanna appointed himself the brigade's commander, and personally recruited and trained young men from the Portadown and Lurgan areas who were "prepared to defend Ulster at any cost". These included Robin "the Jackal" Jackson, Harris Boyle, Wesley Somerville, David Alexander Mulholland, and William Fulton, among others. When a new member was sworn into the UVF, he was brought before a table, which was flanked by two masked men and presided over by another; on the table rested the Ulster banner and a gun. Under Hanna's leadership the Mid-Ulster Brigade became the deadliest loyalist paramilitary group outside Belfast. According to journalist Joe Tiernan, at least 100 Catholics and a number of Protestants, almost exclusively civilians, were all murdered by this nominally illegal terror cell. Tiernan also suggested that Hanna carried out bank and post office robberies and intimidated local businessmen into paying protection money to the Mid-Ulster UVF. Hanna was eventually expelled from the UDR on account of his UVF activity. The Mid-Ulster UVF had always operated as a semi-autonomous, self-contained group maintaining its distance from the Belfast leadership, even if Hanna did have a seat on the Brigade Staff. Journalist Brendan O'Brien stated that the UVF had derived its greatest strength as well as the organisation's most ruthless members from its Mid-Ulster Brigade. Author Don Mullan described the brigade as one of the most ruthless battalions operating in the 1970s. A 2011 RTÉ documentary Bombings called it an "efficient sectarian killing machine". It covered a wide area of operations, drawing membership from Portadown, southern County Londonderry, Dungannon, Armagh, Lurgan, Cookstown, and rural settlements near these towns, although it had little or no membership in County Fermanagh, where loyalist paramilitaries never joined the Royal Ulster Constabulary (RUC) and British Army as the defenders of choice in the eyes of local unionists to the degree they did elsewhere.

The UVF Mid-Ulster Brigade was part of the Glenanne gang, a collaboration between loyalist paramilitaries, the police, and members of the security forces. This group carried out a series of terrorist attacks and murders targeting Catholic civilians, mainly in the South Armagh area, in the 1970s. Composed of members of the UVF, UDR, RUC, Ulster Defence Association (UDA), and covert agents, the Pat Finucane Centre attributes at least 87 violent attacks to this. According to Lethal Allies, permutations of the group killed about 120 people – almost all of whom were Catholic civilians with no links to Irish republican paramilitaries. The Cassel Report investigated 76 killings attributed to the group and found evidence that UDR soldiers and RUC officers were involved in 74 of those. John Weir said his superiors knew he was working with loyalist paramilitaries but allowed it to continue. The Cassel Report also said that some senior officers knew of the crimes but did nothing to prevent, investigate or punish. It has been established that some key members were double agents working for the Intelligence Corps and the RUC Special Branch. It was allegedly directed by the Intelligence Corps and the RUC Special Branch. Its name derived from a farm in Glenanne, County Armagh which was owned by RUC reservist James Mitchell. It was Hanna who first approached Mitchell and obtained permission to use the farm as a UVF arms dump and bomb-making site.

The UVF was a proscribed paramilitary organisation since its formation in 1966; however the ban was lifted on 4 April 1974 by Secretary of State for Northern Ireland, Merlyn Rees in an effort to bring the group into the democratic process. The UVF was once more outlawed by the British government in October 1975, though this had minimal effect as many members were also working for the RUC or British security forces charged with enforcing such laws. Furthermore, the Ulster Defence Association (UDA) remained legal as well.

== Notorious attacks ==
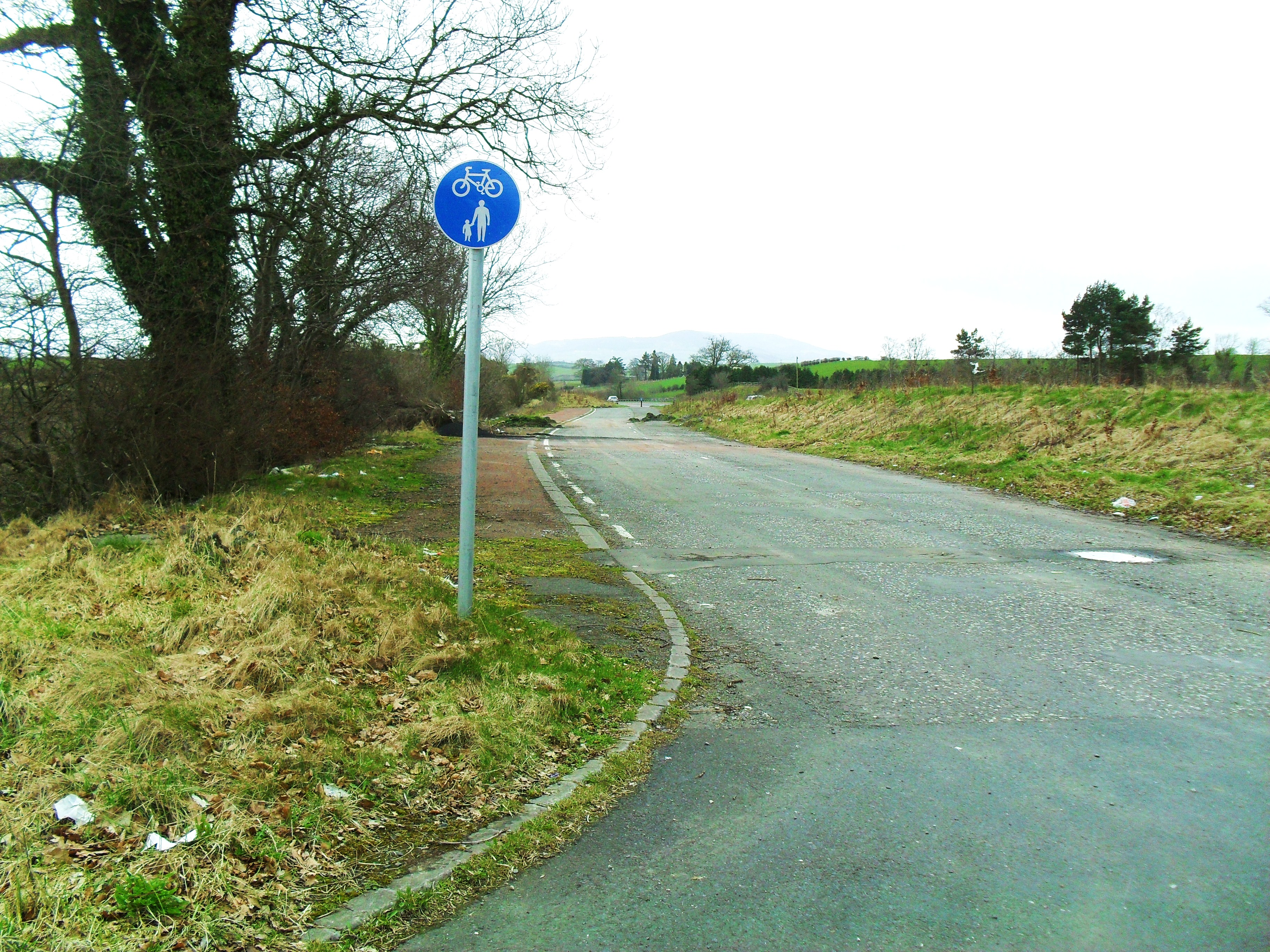
Site of the Miami Showband attack which was carried out by the UVF Mid-Ulster Brigade on 31 July 1975

The Mid-Ulster Brigade carried out two of the most notorious attacks in the history of the Troubles. The first took place on 17 May 1974. Organised and led by Billy Hanna, with Robin Jackson of the Lurgan unit playing a key role, the Mid-Ulster Brigade, along with a team from Belfast, planted three car bombs in Dublin. The devices exploded minutes apart in the city centre during evening rush hour causing the deaths of 26 people – mostly young women – and almost 300 injuries. The bombs had been so well constructed that 100 per cent of each bomb had exploded upon detonation. Hanna had been the mastermind behind the building and planning of the bombings, and Jackson had transported the bombs across the Republic of Ireland border in his poultry lorry accompanied by Hanna, who then primed them at the Coachman's Inn pub carpark on the Swords Road. Hanna and Jackson subsequently loaded the devices inside the boots of the three allocated cars, and the former instructed the three drivers to park the car bombs in Parnell Street, Talbot Street, and South Leinster Street. Ninety minutes after the three Dublin blasts, a fourth car bomb went off in Monaghan, killing another seven people, bringing the total of deaths to 33. No warnings were given for these attacks which brought about the greatest loss of life in a single day in the history of the Troubles. Another Mid-Ulster unit from Portadown, allegedly led by local commander Stewart Young, had carried out the Monaghan attack. Nobody was ever charged in relation to any of the four bombings.

RUC Special Patrol Group officer, John Weir, who worked with the Mid-Ulster UVF, stated in an affidavit that Hanna and Jackson had led one of the Dublin bombing teams. Weir's statement was published in the 2003 Barron Report, which was the findings of a judicial inquiry into the 1974 bombings commissioned by Irish Supreme Court Justice Henry Barron In 1993 Yorkshire Television aired a documentary about the Dublin and Monaghan bombings, The Hidden Hand: The Forgotten Massacre. The narrator named Billy Hanna and Robin Jackson as two of the Dublin bomb team. The two men were also alleged to have had links with the Intelligence Corps and Captain Robert Nairac. Weir stated in his affidavit that Robin Jackson was an RUC Special Branch agent and therefore "untouchable". Former British soldier and psychological warfare operative Major Colin Wallace confirmed this, stating in a letter he had written to a friend in 1975 that he had been told the previous year that Jackson worked as an agent for the RUC's Special Branch. Journalist Joe Tiernan claimed in his book The Dublin Bombings and the Murder Triangle that Hanna was an Intelligence Corps agent and that middle-ranking officers of the corps based at the British Army Headquarters in Lisburn were frequent visitors to his Houston Park home in the Mourneville estate in Lurgan. They supplied him with weapons and petrol for his car. Hanna also regularly invited British soldiers to his house for "cups of tea".

On 27 July 1975, Billy Hanna was shot dead outside his home in Lurgan, allegedly by Robin Jackson, who assumed command of the Mid-Ulster Brigade. Four days later, under the auspices of Robin Jackson, the Mid-Ulster Brigade carried out an attack against The Miami Showband, one of the most popular cabaret bands in Ireland at the time. As the showband was returning to Dublin on 31 July at about 2.30 a.m. after a performance in Banbridge, they were flagged down at a bogus vehicle checkpoint on the main road at Buskill outside Newry by armed members of the Mid-Ulster Brigade wearing British Army uniforms. The band members were ordered out of their minibus and told to line up facing a ditch by the roadside. As one of the gunmen took down their names and addresses, two members of the brigade, Harris Boyle and Wesley Somerville, planted a bomb under the driver's seat of the bus. Martin Dillon suggested that the plan was for the device to explode across the border, wiping out the band as well as making it appear as if the Miami Showband was smuggling bombs on behalf of the Provisional IRA. The bomb, however, went off just as the two men closed the door. They were blown to pieces, and the remaining UVF gunmen opened fire on the dazed band members, killing three (trumpeter Brian McCoy, lead singer Fran O'Toole, and guitarist Tony Geraghty) and wounding two (bassist Stephen Travers and saxophonist Des McAlea). The UVF's Brigade Staff issued a statement twelve hours after the killings in an attempt to justify the attack. It was published in the August 1975 edition of Combat, the UVF's journal.

Three men out of the ten-man UVF unit were later convicted of the murders;Thomas Crozier and James McDowell were serving soldiers of the 11th Battalion UDR, and John James Somerville (brother of Wesley) was a former member of the regiment. An international panel headed by Professor Douglass Cassel was commissioned by the Pat Finucane Centre to investigate collusion between loyalist paramilitaries and the security forces in a series of sectarian attacks and killings in the 1970s. This panel concluded that there was "credible evidence that the principal perpetrator [of the Miami Showband attack] was a man who was not prosecuted – alleged RUC Special Branch agent Robin Jackson" The Pat Finucane Centre and John Weir have both implicated Jackson in at least 100 killings.

Other attacks carried out by the UVF Mid-Ulster brigade included the killing of high-ranking Provisional IRA member John Francis Green in 1975, and the double shooting of the Reavey and O'Dowd families in 1976. Robin Jackson was arrested in October 1979 for possession of weapons, ammunition and hoods. On 20 January 1981, he was sentenced to seven years imprisonment after being convicted of possession of guns and ammunition. He was released a little over two years later in May 1983. This was his only conviction.

== Tit-for-tat killings ==
During the 1980s the Mid-Ulster Brigade became somewhat less prominent as Belfast became the centre of UVF activity. The brigade remained active and continued to launch attacks. One such attack occurred in Coagh on 29 November 1989, when a unit of the Mid-Ulster Brigade entered the Battery Bar and opened fire. Two men were killed in the attack, Michael Devlin, a civilian and Liam Ryan, an important figure in the Provisional IRA East Tyrone Brigade. A series of tit-for-tat shootings began between the Mid-Ulster Brigade and the Provisional IRA, with Catholic civilian Martin Byrne and ex-IRA man Sam Marshall killed in two separate attacks in Lurgan in early 1990. Three more killings followed, including one Protestant shot in a case of mistaken identity, before 19-year-old Denis Carville was killed in Portadown on 6 October. In each case the IRA responded by killing members of the security forces or people working for them, as the killings on both sides spiralled.

The 1991 Cappagh killings took place on 3 March, when a unit from the Mid-Ulster Brigade went to the village of Cappagh, County Tyrone, intent on killing an entire Provisional IRA unit based in the village. Taking up a position outside Boyle's Bar, the gunmen waited for a car to pull up containing republicans and opened fire on them as they exited the vehicle. The UVF men succeeded in killing IRA volunteers John Quinn, Dwayne O'Donnell and Malcolm Nugent before entering the bar and opening fire. One more man, Thomas Armstrong, was killed in the pub but he was not a member of the IRA, while their intended target, Brian Arthurs, survived by crouching behind the bar. A member of the Mid-Ulster Brigade staff would later claim that the Cappagh attack was "one of the best things we did militarily in thirty years" as it proved they could strike directly at the Provisional IRA in an area which was a republican stronghold. Because of the lack of a security force presence in an area where it was usually heavy, republicans and journalist Peter Taylor have alleged security force collusion in the killings, with Taylor suggesting the UDR.

According to journalist and author Ed Moloney, the UVF campaign in Mid-Ulster in this period "indisputably shattered Republican morale", and put the leadership of the republican movement under intense pressure to "do something". However, according to Tony Geraghty's The Irish War, the IRA managed to get revenge against the Mid-Ulster Brigade by killing five of their top members. According to Geraghty, the IRA "was never broken" by the actions of the UVF, and instead managed to successfully engage both the police and military as well as the paramilitaries.

== Billy "King Rat" Wright ==
Although senior UVF figures consistently claimed he was not involved in the Cappagh attack, the media blamed the killings on the leader of the Portadown unit, Billy Wright, known as "King Rat". Wright became a figure widely covered in the press. However, it was certain that Wright's unit became the most active in Mid-Ulster with the killing of two teenage girls and an adult civilian at a mobile shop on a Catholic housing estate in Craigavon on 28 March 1991, one of their more ferocious acts. At this stage the Mid-Ulster Brigade's continuation of the UVF policy of random sectarian attacks meant that it had diverged from the policies being undertaken by their Belfast counterparts, where an attempt was being made to lessen such attacks in favour of targeting known and active republicans.

At some point during the early 1990s, Wright took over command of the brigade from Jackson and as a result, another spate of violent attacks by the Mid-Ulster Brigade erupted. Wright's UVF gang called themselves "The Brat Pack". Wright is believed to have started dealing drugs in 1991, mainly in ecstasy. It was around this time that Sunday World journalists Martin O'Hagan and Jim Campbell coined the term "Rat Pack" for the Brigade. Unable at first to identify Wright by name for legal reasons, they christened him "King Rat". Eventually the newspaper named Wright as a drug lord and sectarian murderer. Wright was apparently enraged by the nickname and made numerous threats against O'Hagan and Campbell. The Sunday World's offices were also firebombed. The BBC's Mark Davenport stated that he spoke to a drug dealer who told him that he paid Wright protection money. Loyalists in Portadown such as Bobby Jameson stated that the LVF was not a "loyalist organisation but a drugs organisation causing misery in Portadown".

The Brigade was also prominent in the Drumcree conflict. According to the Northern Ireland security forces, Wright directed up to 20 sectarian killings, although he was never convicted in connection with any of them. Wright, along with the Portadown unit of the Mid-Ulster Brigade, was officially stood down by the UVF's Brigade Staff on 2 August 1996. This came about after members of the group had killed Catholic taxi driver Michael McGoldrick outside Lurgan during the Drumcree disturbances, while the UVF were on ceasefire. Wright, who was expelled from the UVF, ordered to leave Northern Ireland, and threatened with execution, defied the Belfast leadership. He publicly denounced the Brigade staff as "communists", and went on to form the Loyalist Volunteer Force (LVF), taking a significant number of Mid-Ulster Brigade members with him including his deputy Mark "Swinger" Fulton.

Authors such as Martin Dillon argue that the Mid-Ulster Brigade had long established a reputation as a being a 'rogue' unit within the UVF that was responsible for some of the most savage sectarian attacks of the Troubles. Under Wright, the Mid-Ulster Brigade became notorious for attacks that involved shooting female Catholic civilians at close range. These included the shooting of Eileen Duffy (19) and Katrina Rennie (17) in Lurgan in 1991 as the teenage girls bought sweets in a mobile van. The girls were targeted because the killers believed they were Catholic. Both girls were shot at close range while another 14-year-old girl, Jamie Smith, was called a "fenian slut" by one of the gunmen before being dragged by the hair and thrown out of the shop. The Sunday World published an article on 18 September 2011 in which the paper stated that the attack was "planned by Billy Wright and fellow UVF murderer, Mark Swinger Fulton, in a flat in Portadown's loyalist Corcrain Estate." A seven-month-pregnant Catholic woman, Kathleen O'Hagan, was shot dead by the Brigade in front of her children in August 1994 in Creggan, County Tyrone. In July 1997, another teenage girl, Bernadette Martin, was shot in the head four times as she slept next to her Protestant boyfriend, Gordon Greene, in Aghalee. The killing was thought to have been ordered by Wright after having been expelled from the UVF.

Wright was killed on 27 December 1997 inside the Maze Prison, where he was imprisoned for having made threats, once more against a woman. Three members of the Irish National Liberation Army (INLA) shot Wright dead inside a prison van in the forecourt outside H Block 6 as it was transporting him and fellow LVF prisoner Norman Green to the visitors' complex. Five months after Wright's assassination, Robin Jackson died of lung cancer at his home in the village of Donaghcloney, near Lurgan.

== Subsequent activity ==
Whilst the entire Portadown UVF defected to the LVF, other important Mid-Ulster Brigade units based in Lurgan, Donaghcloney, Richill and Banbridge instead swore loyalty to the Belfast leadership. A balaclava-wearing Mid-Ulster Brigade member appeared at a rally on Belfast's Shankill Road on 2 September 1996 to read out a statement in which the remnants of the Mid-Ulster Brigade described the Wright-LVF issue as being "about internal discipline within the UVF" and denounced Wright for breaking the UVF's code. The feud re-ignited in 2000 and 2001 when the Mid-Ulster Brigade effectively eliminated the LVF. It was during this feud that brigadier Richard Jameson, leader of the Mid-Ulster Brigade, was shot dead by the LVF outside his home near Portadown on 10 January 2000. A month later, members of the Mid-Ulster Brigade beat and stabbed Protestant teenagers, Andrew Robb and David McIlwaine to death on a country road outside Tandragee, County Armagh after one of them had made disparaging comments about Jameson's killing earlier on at a drinking party. Neither of the boys was a member of the LVF or any other loyalist paramilitary organisation.

The brigade was a centre of opposition to leadership plans to decommission weapons in 2007, leading to sixty members being stood down by the Belfast leadership. Subsequently, a group in the area calling itself the "Real UVF" issued a series of threats against Sinn Féin members in 2008 and against dissident republicans in 2010. What connection, if any, exists between the Mid-Ulster Brigade and the Real UVF is not known.

The Mid-Ulster UVF was blamed for a series of attacks and disturbances in Portadown during the Orange Order's "marching season" in July 2011.
