= Jackie Coulter (loyalist) =

Loyalist paramilitary member from Belfast, Northern Ireland

- Born: 22 May 1954; Shankill Road, Belfast, Northern Ireland
- Died: 21 August 2000 (aged 46); Crumlin Road, Belfast, Northern Ireland
- Military career
- Paramilitary: Ulster Defence Association
- Rank: Lieutenant
- Units: C Company, West Belfast Brigade
- Conflicts: The Troubles; 2000 UDA-UVF Feud

Jackie Coulter (22 May 1954 – 21 August 2000) was a member of a loyalist paramilitary from Belfast, Northern Ireland who held the rank of lieutenant in the Ulster Defence Association (UDA). He was killed by the rival loyalist paramilitary organisation the Ulster Volunteer Force (UVF), as the result of a feud within loyalism.

== Paramilitary activity ==
Coulter, brought up as a Protestant, and a native of the loyalist Shankill Road area of Belfast joined the UDA at an unknown date as a member of his local West Belfast Brigade. He acquired the rank of Lieutenant and was described as being a close ally of UDA brigadier and leading loyalist Johnny Adair. He resided in St Mary's Court, a side street between the Shankill Road and the Crumlin Road and was married to wife Agnes having four children.

Coulter was recognised as the commander of "C3A Commandos", a unit of C Company, the lower Shankill section of the West Belfast Brigade. He was also known to act as a driver for Johnny Adair. One of Coulter's children, his daughter Tracey, lived with Stephen McKeag for a time although the relationship soured amid allegations of domestic violence. Coulter had complained to Adair about his daughter's treatment shortly before his death and in response Adair sent a punishment squad to his former friend's home with McKeag beaten severely and expelled from C Company.

== Loyalist feud ==
Before Coulter's death, tension between the two main loyalist paramilitary had been building. The cause of the feud was attributed to the actions of Johnny Adair and his alliance with the dissident loyalist faction the Loyalist Volunteer Force (LVF). The UVF had a tense relationship with the LVF since its formation as a breakaway group from the UVF led by Billy Wright.

Amidst an atmosphere of increasing tension in the area, Adair decided to host a "Loyalist Day of Culture" on the Shankill on Saturday, 19 August 2000, which saw around a dozen new murals officially unveiled in his lower Shankill powerbase. The UVF leadership, who had been given assurances that no LVF regalia would be displayed on the Shankill on the day of the parade, as well as the rest of the UDA outside of Adair's "C Company", Adair obtained a LVF flag which he planned to have unfurled as the parade passed the Rex Bar, a bar located in the middle of the Shankill Road and which is associated with the UVF, with the obvious intent of antagonising the UVF. Adair waited until the majority of the parade had made its way up the Shankill Road before initiating the provocative gesture of having the LVF flag unfurled outside the Rex. When this happened skirmishes broke out between UVF members who had been standing outside the premises watching the parade and those who had unfurled the contentious flag. Prior to this the atmosphere at the Rex had been relaxed, with the UVF spectators even joining in to sing UDA songs along to the tunes of the UDA-aligned flute bands that accompanied the approximately 10,000 UDA marchers on their parade up the Shankill. But bitter fighting ensued, with around 300 C Company (the name given to the lower Shankill unit of the UDA's West Belfast Brigade) members attacking the patrons of the Rex, initially with hand weapons such as bats and iron bars, before they shot up the bar as its patrons barricaded themselves inside. Also targeted with gunfire was the Progressive Unionist Party (PUP) headquarters that faced the pub. C Company then went on the rampage in the lower Shankill, attacking the houses of known UVF members and their families, including the home of veteran UVF leader Gusty Spence, and evicting the inhabitants at gunpoint as they wrecked, stole property and set fire to homes. Coulter had played no part in any of the violence as by that point his only real involvement in loyalism was working on behalf of the welfare of UDA prisoners. He regularly drove a bus carrying prisoners' families to the Maze prison on visiting days.

== Death ==
Two days later, on 21 August, the UVF initiated retaliation for the UDA's action. Parked in a Land Rover Discovery outside a bookmakers on the Crumlin Road with former UVF member Bobby Mahood, Coulter was spotted by a young, inexperienced UVF gunman. Ironically, the two men were believed to have been discussing a solution for easing the recent tension between the two groups. Coulter was killed instantly in the attack and Mahood died a few hours later. The target of the attack had actually been Jackie Mahood, a leading figure in the Belfast LVF, with the inexperienced gunman mistaking Bobby Mahood for his brother. Although the killing was not directly claimed by the UVF the Progressive Unionist Party, the UVF's political wing, admitted that the UVF had been behind the killings. Both Adair and John White arrived on the scene in the immediate aftermath of the shooting and held an impromptu press conference in which they blamed the killings on the UVF.

Coulter's funeral was held four days later on 25 August. Notable figures from within loyalism attended the funeral, including John White and Frank McCoubrey. All six brigades of the UDA were represented and the LVF was represented by one of its senior members Gary Fulton, who laid a wreath. In all, around 1000 people attended the funeral.

The funeral left Coulter's home on St Mary's Court on the Shankill. The cortege briefly stopped at the spot where Coulter was killed outside a betting shop on the Crumlin Road. A flatbed lorry containing floral tributes with blacked out number plates led the cortege. Businesses along the route were closed and there was a heavy police and army presence in the back streets around the Shankill in case of trouble. Coulter was buried in Roselawn Cemetery where a UDA statement expressing "disgust at the cowardly and brutal murder" was read out.

== Aftermath ==
The UDA avenged Coulter's death by killing 22-year-old UVF member Sam Rocket at his girlfriend's home at Summer Street in the Oldpark Road area of Belfast. The Lower Oldpark, a small loyalist enclave close to the republican Cliftonville and Ardoyne areas, was known as a stronghold of Adair's C Company. Rocket like Coulter was also buried at Roselawn Cemetery. The feud continued on as more killings were carried on until its end in November 2000 including that of UDA member Tommy English. Coulter is commemorated on a wall mural in Boundary Way on the Lower Shankill.

One of Coulter's daughters, Tracey, in 2009, had her home attacked on two occasions and received death threats from the UVF. She believed the attacks were linked to an investigation into the circumstances surrounding her father's death.

In May 2012, Tracey Coulter gave an interview stating that although her family had given permission at the time for the police to retain part of her father's skull for investigative purposes, they received a letter from the Police Service of Northern Ireland telling her that more body parts of her deceased father may have been retained.

== See also ==
- List of unsolved murders (2000–present)
