= Jim Spence (loyalist) =

Northern Irish loyalist activist (born c. 1960)

- Born: James Spence c. 1960 (age 65–66); Belfast, Northern Ireland
- Military career
- Allegiance: Ulster Defence Association (UDA)
- Rank: Brigadier
- Nickname: Spencer
- Units: B Company, West Belfast Brigade
- Conflict: The Troubles

Jim Spence (born c. 1960) is a Northern Irish former loyalist activist. Spence became notorious for his time in the Ulster Defence Association (UDA), serving two spells in charge of the West Belfast Brigade. Spence is a native of the Woodvale area of Belfast's Shankill Road.

== B Company and collusion ==
=== Gerard Slane ===
Spence was commander of 'B' Company of the UDA's West Belfast Brigade, which covered the Woodvale area at the top of the Shankill Road, during the 1980s and 1990s. In this role Spence was closely involved with British agent Brian Nelson. On 22 September 1988, Gerard Slane was shot dead at his Falls Road home after members of the UDA broke down his front door and shot him four times in the head. An article that appeared in the UDA's Ulster magazine claimed that Slane was a member of the Irish People's Liberation Organisation (IPLO) and had driven the getaway car when UDA member Billy Quee was killed by that group, although the IPLO did not claim Slane as a member following his killing.

In 1992, Nelson issued a statement in which he placed the blame on Spence for the killing. According to Nelson, he had obtained a photograph of Slane and had shown it to eyewitnesses who identified Slane as the driver at Quee's killing. Nelson claimed that he then gave the picture to Spence, who told Nelson "I'll soon deal with him" and dispatched a murder squad, after first sending a reconnaissance team to find Slane's house. Johnny Adair would later frequently recount the details of how he had been one of the two gunmen to kill Slane, although in truth this had not been the case. The actual killers have not been identified but they were picked by Spence from within the ranks of B Company whilst Adair had always been a member of the Lower Shankill's C Company. The Attorney General for Northern Ireland ordered that the murder case be reopened in June 2011 to investigate the collusion allegations.

== Brigadier ==
In 1990, Spence was one of a number of leading figures within the West Belfast UDA imprisoned as part of the Stevens Inquiries. Tommy Lyttle, the West Belfast brigadier was the first to be jailed and he was soon followed by Matt Kincaid, Spence and William "Winkie" Dodds, the commanders respectively of A, B and C companies, the brigade's three sub-units. Soon after his arrest Lyttle was removed as Brigadier and declared persona non grata, for most of his allies in the UDA had already retired or died. Tommy Irvine, who replaced Lyttle as West Belfast Brigadier, favoured a less centralised structure to the Brigade and gave more of a free hand to the more violent-minded younger men such as Spence, Adair and Mo Courtney. Irvine made Spence military commander of the West Belfast Brigade, although only a few weeks into this role Spence's Stevens Inquiries arrest came.

Irvine was himself arrested in August 1990, and following his incarceration was very briefly replaced by Ken Barrett. However, a power struggle broke out, and Billy Kennedy, Tommy Lyttle's brother-in-law, briefly assumed the role of West Belfast Brigadier. Spence, however, was released from prison in October and he immediately assumed the role of Brigadier for himself, appointing Johnny Adair to the role of military commander.

By late 1991 Spence had begun to resent the power and influence enjoyed by Adair and he feared that C Company, which remained Adair's main power base, had become financially independent of the West Belfast Brigade. Spence was pleased when Adair's Langley Street Social Club, a major source of income, was raided by police and put out of business but his anxiety was raised further when Adair began to talk of targeting members of the Royal Ulster Constabulary (RUC), something that was generally an anathema to loyalists. Ultimately, however, Spence and Adair remained close friends and as a result the brigadier was able to persuade his second in command to abandon plans to kill police. Indeed, their friendship was so close that during the summer of 1993 the pair went on holiday together with their families to Tenerife.

While Adair had taken care of the killing side in West Belfast Spence had concentrated on the moneymaking elements of the UDA and had built up a large network of extortion and racketeering. Spence was arrested on charges of extortion in March 1993, and as was the established procedure, he was forced to relinquish his position as Brigadier. As a consequence Johnny Adair immediately succeeded Spence as West Belfast Brigadier.

== Spence and Adair ==
From prison Spence became increasingly angry at the violence of Adair, particularly the killing of Noel Cardwell by C Company in December 1993. Cardwell was a glass collector at the Diamond Jubilee Bar with a mental age of 12 who liked to be around the C Company top men. They in turn viewed Cardwell as a harmless figure of fun. In December 1993 Cardwell was taken to the Royal Victoria Hospital, Belfast after suffering a bad reaction when his drink was spiked with an ecstasy tablet by a member of C Company. Whilst in the hospital he was visited by members of the RUC who asked him who he had been drinking with. Cardwell named the UDA members he was with, having failed to grasp the code of secrecy governing the UDA.

To send a message to informers Adair had Cardwell abducted following his release from hospital and subjected to a long and brutal interrogation process. He was shot and left to bleed to death with C Company member Gary McMaster later sentenced to life imprisonment for his part in the murder. Spence reacted to the killing with disgust, considering Cardwell to be harmless, and along with Matt Kincaid even concocted a plot to have a gun placed in Adair's house in order that he would be imprisoned with them to give them a chance to reason with him. Ultimately the plan was not enacted as Adair remained a hugely popular figure on the Shankill despite the killing. However, Spence, or "Spencer" as he was known locally, remained an ally of Adair and following his release in the mid-1990s returned to influence under new brigadier Winkie Dodds, whom Adair had appointed in his stead following his own arrest. Spence attended the wedding of Adair and Gina Crossan, held in prison, on 21 February 1997. Like Adair, Spence also advocated a closer relationship with the emerging Loyalist Volunteer Force (LVF) and Spence personally enjoyed a close relationship with Jackie Mahood, a former member of the Ulster Volunteer Force (UVF) who was allied to the LVF leader Billy Wright and who tried to convince the Portadown-based leader to take control of the UVF as a whole.

Following Adair's release and return to the role of Brigadier he attempted to involve Spence, back in command of B Company, in his 2000 feud with the UVF. On 21 August the UVF had shot and killed two of Adair's allies, Jackie Coulter and Bobby Mahood, whilst they sat in a car on the Crumlin Road. Soon afterwards Adair saw Progressive Unionist Party spokesman Billy Hutchinson on television and immediately rang Spence and told him to "shoot the fucker ... right now". Spence intimated that he would although he had no desire to become involved in the feud, whilst Adair did not realise that Spence's phone had been bugged by Special Branch who heard the entire conversation. Spence was particularly wary of provoking open conflict with the UVF, as, unlike Adair's Lower Shankill stronghold, the Woodvale area was solid UVF turf, and for a spell the social club Spence and B Company ran on Heather Street had to be guarded by soldiers of the British Army due to anticipation of an attack. No attack on Hutchinson took place and Adair was returned to jail soon afterwards, the feud ending as a result.

=== Fall of Adair ===
In June 2002 an episode of the BBC programme Panorama was broadcast in which Nelson's claims linking Spence to the Pat Finucane killing were broadcast. It was not the first time that such allegations had been made as rumours that Spence was an informer had surfaced regularly. The suggestion that Spence was a high-ranking informer raised some anger, and for Mo Courtney the only solution was to kill Spence. Adair refused to sanction the killing, as he remained on good terms with Spence and felt that he was loyal, and the incident helped to drive a wedge between Adair and Courtney. Adair finally broke from Spence in 2003 when South Belfast Brigadier Jackie McDonald purged the Shankill of C Company and Adair's supporters. Adair reacted by denouncing Spence as a "liar and a tout" in a carefully orchestrated media campaign over the following months. Spence, who had tired of Adair's extremism, had helped to facilitate McDonald's assault on the Lower Shankill.

== Subsequent activity ==
Spence was loyal to the new regime on the Shankill, and in late 2003 he once again took over as Brigadier in West Belfast when Adair's replacement, Spence's old rival Mo Courtney, was arrested. By early 2004 he had officially vacated this role, as the constant press attacks from Adair began to damage his credibility and a comeback by Adair began to look a distinct possibility. Ultimately, however, this did not materialise, and when Adair left prison the following year he immediately left for Bolton, where his followers had fled to in 2003. Spence, meanwhile, had, in fact, remained as Brigadier and was still in the role by November 2004.

In 2006 the Daily Ireland reported that the UDA intended to expel Spence, as part of a move aimed at removing a number of "undesirables", including the Shoukri brothers, whose presence was seen as damaging the UDA's chances of securing government funding for its projects. The paper reported that there was a reluctance amongst the leadership to oust Spence, however, as he controlled the finances in West Belfast and would be likely to abscond with much of their money. Rumours that Spence was to be stood down had in fact first appeared in the paper as early as April 2005. However, Spence was replaced as Brigadier in 2006 by fellow long-term activist Matt Kincaid.

Spence was recorded most recently in March 2011 as part of a publicly funded trip to Auschwitz, where he accompanied other veteran loyalists such as Courtney and Billy McQuiston on a trip to learn about Polish culture. Allegations, however, appeared in the press that Spence and his fellow loyalists actually spent most of their time at bars and strip clubs.

=== North Belfast feud ===
Beginning in 2013 and continuing into the following year, a loyalist feud broke out within the UDA North Belfast Brigade between the supporters of its leader John Bunting and a dissident tendency based in Tigers Bay who sought to oust Bunting and install Robert Molyneaux as a replacement. From the start Bunting, as well as fellow brigadiers Jackie McDonald and Jimmy Birch, stated that elements within the West Belfast Brigade were closely involved with the dissidents and as a result the West Belfast Brigade split from the rest of the UDA.

Spence was widely reported as one of the leading figures in the conspiracy and in early 2014 UDA leaders approached Matt Kincaid, offering him the chance to re-integrate the West Belfast Brigade with the wider UDA if he expelled Spence and Mo Courtney. Kincaid rejected the proposal however, opting instead to support Courtney and Spence. In September 2014 it was reported in the Belfast Telegraph that Bunting, McDonald and Birch, as well as the head of the Derry and North Antrim Brigade had met to discuss the feud as well as the schism with the West Belfast Brigade. According to the report they agreed that West Belfast Brigade members loyal to the wider UDA should establish a new command structure for the brigade which would then take the lead in ousting the three men they identified as the biggest trouble-makers, namely Courtney, Spence and Eric McKee from their existing leadership positions. It was also stated that the West Belfast breakaway leaders had recruited Jimbo Simpson, a former North Belfast brigadier driven out of Northern Ireland over a decade earlier, and were seeking to restore him to his former role.

Other offices
Preceded by Billy Kennedy	Ulster Defence Association West Belfast Brigadier; 1990–1993	Succeeded by Johnny Adair
Preceded by Mo Courtney	Ulster Defence Association West Belfast Brigadier; 2003–2006	Succeeded by Matt Kincaid
