= Matt Kincaid =

Northern Irish loyalist paramilitary leader and activist

Matthew Kincaid is a Northern Irish loyalist paramilitary leader and activist. Kincaid is the head of the West Belfast Brigade of the Ulster Defence Association (UDA).

== Early years ==
Kincaid joined the West Belfast Brigade of the UDA at an early age and, as a native of the Highfield estate, a staunchly loyalist area at the top of the Shankill Road and adjacent to the republican Springfield Road, he was assigned to the brigade's "A Company".

Kincaid was one of a number of members of the West Belfast UDA arrested in the wake of the Stevens Inquiries. Along with Winkie Dodds and Eric McKee he was one of a number of prominent young members of the group be imprisoned as a result of the Inquiries. He was sentenced to four years imprisonment for possessing information likely to be of use to terrorists.

== Brigadier ==
Kincaid took charge of the West Belfast Brigade following the removal of his predecessor Jim Spence. Initially, Kincaid largely followed the lead of Jackie McDonald, the brigadier in South Belfast who had emerged as effective leader of the overall UDA in the aftermath of his removal of Johnny Adair. In particular, Kincaid joined McDonald in his opposition to the activity of the Shoukri brothers and supported attempts to force them out of the UDA. Kincaid also backed the expulsion of Gary Fisher and Tommy Kirkham in 2007 and joined McDonald and other brigadiers in visiting Newtownabbey in an ultimately failed attempt to bring the dissident UDA South East Antrim Brigade back into the mainstream organisation. In 2009 he followed McDonald's lead by ensuring that the West Belfast Brigade took part in the decommissioning process.

== Estrangement ==
Eventually however, the relationship between Kincaid and McDonald broke down. In 2012 Kincaid released a statement condemning McDonald after the South Belfast leader had been critical of the conduct of the Orange Order and their supporters during the Twelfth that year. Kincaid then clashed with Jimmy Birch, a close friend of McDonald and the brigadier in East Belfast, over an alleged theft of guns by West Belfast Brigade members, with the two having a public argument in the car park of a leisure centre in the east of the city.

In February 2014 Kincaid attended a meeting with Jackie McDonald, Jimmy Birch and John Bunting aimed at ending the division. In what was reported as a surprise move, Kincaid rejected their proposal that he remain as leader provided he expelled Spence and McKee, both named as informers by Desmond Lorenz de Silva's report into the murder of Pat Finucane and collusion, and instead decided to support his old friends.
