= William Borland =

William Borland is the name of:

- William Patterson Borland (1867–1919), U.S. Representative from Missouri
- William Borland (loyalist) (1969–2016), Northern Irish former footballer and loyalist activist
- William Borland (darts player) (born 1996), Scottish darts player
