= Joe English (loyalist) =

Ulster loyalist activist

- Born: Joseph English; Rathcoole, Newtownabbey, Northern Ireland
- Years active: 1970s-1997
- Known for: Ulster loyalist
- Political party: Ulster Democratic Party
- Military career
- Allegiance: Ulster Defence Association
- Service years: 1970s - 1996
- Rank: Brigadier
- Unit: UDA South East Antrim Brigade
- Conflict: The Troubles

Joe English is a former Ulster loyalist activist. English was a leading figure in both the Ulster Defence Association (UDA) and the Ulster Democratic Party (UDP) and was instrumental in the early stages of the Northern Ireland peace process. He is a native of the Rathcoole area of Newtownabbey, Northern Ireland. English is a member of the Apprentice Boys of Derry.

== Early years ==
English had been a member of the Ulster Defence Association (UDA) since the early days of the Troubles. He first came to prominence in the 1980s when he was involved in writing Common Sense, a UDA policy document that supported a form of power-sharing with Catholics. He was an opponent of Davy Payne, the UDA's North Belfast brigadier and an unpopular figure with many members due to allegations of racketeering and involvement in the death of John McMichael. He served as acting brigadier in South East Antrim following illness striking existing brigadier Alan Snoddy and in this role voted to retain the leadership of Andy Tyrie, a motion that was not successful.

English served an advisor to the UDA's Inner Council and in 1990 whilst in this position he was arrested as part of the Stevens Inquiries. English was taken in, along with East Belfast brigadier Billy Elliot, for possessing confidential security documents. Whilst on remand English, who was subsequently released without charge, had a confrontation with Danny Morrison who was also on remand over kidnapping charges. Along with Ray Smallwoods, English, as representative of the Combined Loyalist Military Command, was in regular contact with Robin Eames during the early 1990s and the Archbishop of Armagh's pleas for peace impacted on English's thinking.

== Brigadier ==
The structure of the UDA changed following the removal of Andy Tyrie as chairman in March 1988 and leadership became shared between the six regional brigadiers. This became known as the Inner Council. Along with this a number of new brigadiers were appointed and amongst these was English who was given command of the UDA's East Antrim brigade. Despite his high rank English was fairly weak on military matters and garnered a reputation within the UDA for being more politically minded rather than militant.

Given his seniority, English chaired the meetings of the Inner Council although at these meetings he often struggled to control West Belfast brigadier Johnny Adair. Adair disliked English, considering him too political; as a result he dismissed English and the other brigadiers as "old ginnies" and "cardboard cut-outs". For his part, English was said to fear Adair, who had a fearsome reputation for violence, and was careful not to push him too far. English's rivalry with Adair was strong and when Adair's leading hitman Stephen McKeag murdered Marie Teresa Dowds de Mogollon on 30 August 1993 in what was an unpopular killing with the UDA outside the Shankill area. Adair even threatened to shoot English when he suggested that the UDA should not claim the murder. Later in the year English was forced to confront Adair about rumours that he was considering attending an Inner Council meeting armed in order to eliminate the other five brigadiers and assume sole control of the UDA.

On the Inner Council English represented the strongest advocate of the proposed ceasefire and as 1994 approached, he was able to get the support of Tom Reid and Gary Matthews, the north and east Belfast brigadiers respectively. In between Adair and English stood Billy McFarland and Alex Kerr, both of whom appeared to sympathise with English's pro-settlement agenda but who also were on good terms with Adair. As well as his advocacy of the Downing Street Declaration, English had also held dialogue with representatives of the Workers' Party.

== Ulster Democratic Party ==
By the time the ceasefire was announced in 1994, English had become a public figure as a member of the Ulster Democratic Party (UDP) and was one of the party's three representatives at Fernhill House, Glencairn when the CLMC ceasefire was announced on 13 October that same year. Before long he accompanied party colleagues Gary McMichael and Davy Adams, as well as Progressive Unionist Party leaders Gusty Spence, Billy Hutchinson and David Ervine on a tour of the United States that included a speaking engagement at the National Committee on American Foreign Policy. On 17 March 1995 English was one of the UDP delegates to attend a meeting with US president Bill Clinton. At the public Saint Patrick's Day celebrations that followed the meeting English gained media attention when he cried at a rendition of the traditional Irish ballad 'Danny Boy'.

English stood for the UDP in East Antrim at the Northern Ireland Forum election of 1996, and was also fourth on the party's "top-up" list, but he was not elected.

== Removal from UDA ==
In common with many of the older members of the UDA, English was vehemently opposed to the drugs trade and when individual brigadiers took up drug dealing he would give their names to contacts he had in the press. However English's anti-drugs stance was eventually to be the cause of his downfall. Amongst those that English had mentioned to journalists was John "Grugg" Gregg; but English's fellow Rathcoole native, who had replaced English as brigadier, discovered that English had given information to the press. As a result, Gregg, who had a reputation as one of the UDA's fiercest members outside the Shankill Road, forced English out of the UDA and removed him from the political scene. He resigned from his role as chairman of the UDP in 1997.

English was allowed to continue living in Rathcoole but was considered persona non grata to the point that in 2001 a recently released UDA prisoner was beaten up on the estate for continuing to treat English as a friend. In December 2000, nine shots were fired through the window of his home, although no one was hurt in the attack. His Doagh Road home was again attacked in July 2001 when three shots were fired through the window. Gregg was killed in February 2003 as part of a loyalist feud and a new leadership took charge of the UDA Southeast Antrim Brigade.

His most recent public appearance was in 2009 at the funeral of peace activist Reverend Roy Magee.

Other offices
| Preceded by Alan Snoddy | Ulster Defence Association South East Antrim Brigadier; 1988–1990s | Succeeded by John Gregg |
