= John Boreland =

Northern Irish footballer and loyalist activist

- Image of Boreland released by the Police Service of Northern Ireland following his death
- Born: 1969
- Died: 7 August 2016 (aged 46); Belfast, Northern Ireland
- Cause of death: Gunshot wound
- Body discovered: Sunningdale Gardens, North Belfast
- Organization: Ulster Defence Association
- Known for: Footballer, loyalist paramilitary
- Title: UDA North Belfast Brigadier
- Term: 2003–2004
- Predecessor: Ihab Shoukri
- Successor: Andre Shoukri
- Criminal charges: Blackmail, intimidation, firearm possession
- Criminal penalty: Nine years imprisonment
- Criminal status: Released
- Children: 3

William John Boreland (1969 – 7 August 2016) was a Northern Irish footballer and loyalist activist. He came to prominence in the early years of the 21st century when he served as leader of the North Belfast Brigade of the Ulster Defence Association (UDA) and, as such, one of the six commanders of the movement as a whole. Boreland was killed in a shooting at his Belfast home in 2016.

== Early years ==
In his youth Boreland was a talented footballer and he had been on the books of Linfield F.C., the most successful club in the history of the Irish Football League. He also represented Cliftonville F.C., a club associated with the nationalist community in north Belfast.

Boreland joined the UDA's North Belfast brigade and became close to Andre Shoukri. In 2000, he was arrested along with Shoukri and his brother Ihab on charges of extortion relating to a Catholic-owned DIY shop in Glengormley on the outskirts of north Belfast. Boreland would ultimately serve a brief prison sentence for his involvement in this incident.

== Brigadier ==
In 2003 the North Belfast Brigade experienced a rapid turnover in leadership. Andre Shoukri, who had only succeeded Jimbo Simpson the previous year, was given a two-year prison sentence for possessing a gun. According to UDA rules this meant he had to vacate his position as Brigadier, with his brother Ihab assuming the position. However, Ihab Shoukri was also arrested, along with Mo Courtney, for the murder of Alan McCullough, a former member of Johnny Adair's C Company, who was killed by the UDA after returning from exile in Bolton, despite supposedly having received assurances of his safety from the UDA leadership. The Police Service of Northern Ireland (PSNI) announced that Boreland had succeeded the Shoukris as the North Belfast brigadier in September 2003 and suggested that he had ordered a series of attacks against the homes of Catholic residents on the Deerpark Road, an area sandwiched between the loyalist Glenbryn and republican Ardoyne areas. Three families were driven from the area in the first week of attacks, including an elderly Protestant woman who was targeted after speaking out in support of her Catholic neighbours. The incident helped set the tone for Boreland's time in charge as his reign was characterised by a growing climate of fear, with the UDA's popularity amongst north Belfast's Protestants falling very low as a result.

Boreland's position as leader was not wholly secure, however, and Simpson saw in his appointment an opportunity to make a comeback of his own. Simpson began a whispering campaign against Boreland, questioning his credentials for leadership and suggesting that he had done nothing of note during the Troubles. On 13 October 2003, a team of around forty UDA members loyal to Simpson travelled up Boreland's native Crumlin Road to attack homes and premises in the Glenbryn and Ballysillan areas in order to launch Simpson's bid for reclaiming the leadership. However, the security forces had prior warning of what was to happen and a combined operation by the police and army quickly defused the situation and killed off Simpson's rebellion. In order to ensure compliance, Boreland had a number of the rebels subjected to punishment shootings.

For the Twelfth, in July 2004, Boreland led a group of UDA members past the Ardoyne shops as followers of a contentious Orange Order parade at the interface area, despite the Parades Commission stating that the march could only pass the shops without followers. His involvement in the parade led to the Social Democratic and Labour Party's Martin Morgan threatening to resign from the Northern Ireland Policing Board after accusing the PSNI of ignoring the rulings of the Parades Commission due to Boreland and the other paramilitaries being allowed to march.

== Shoukri's deputy ==
Andre Shoukri was released from prison in 2004 and returned to his earlier position of brigadier. According to PSNI reports, Boreland, who was a close friend and ally of Shoukri, retained a central role in the North Belfast UDA as deputy to Shoukri.

In November 2005, Boreland was arrested, along with Andre Shoukri, on charges of extortion. Boreland and Shoukri had been recorded attempting to extort money from a worker at a local bar, Bonaparte's, whilst Boreland faced separate charges of intimidating a second person and demanding the bars' keys, books and cheque books whilst possessing a gun. According to evidence at the trial, the extortion had been ongoing and, early in the year, the bar manager's husband had been lured to a meeting with Shoukri and Boreland where they put a gun to his head.

== Imprisonment ==
Boreland, who was based in Sunningdale Gardens in the Ballysillan district of North Belfast at the time of the trial, was given a nine-year prison sentence after being found guilty of four charges of blackmail and one of intimidation and firearm possession in late 2007.

On his release, Boreland was pictured in The Irish News with Andre Shoukri attending an event to commemorate killed UDA members in north Belfast on Remembrance Day 2011.

== Feud ==
During 2013 a loyalist feud broke out in the North Belfast Brigade between the supporters of leader John Bunting and his ally John Howcroft and dissident members who wanted to replace the existing leadership with Robert Molyneaux. In August 2014 as part of this internal struggle, Boreland, who had become associated with the pro-Molyneaux wing, was attacked with a breeze block and shot in the leg close to his home in Carr's Glen. Following the attack both Bunting and Howcroft were arrested on suspicion of involvement. The charges were dropped in September 2015.

== Death ==
Boreland was shot and killed at his Sunningdale Gardens home on the evening of 7 August 2016. He was shot at close range at 21:50 BST as he returned to his flat by an assailant wielding a shotgun.

Boreland had visited a local pub, the Hedgehog and Bucket on the nearby Oldpark Road, and was returning home when the attack occurred. A Police Service of Northern Ireland spokesman said in the aftermath of the shooting that they had warned Boreland some months earlier that he was a target for attack.

His funeral was held on 13 August at the Moravian Church on the Oldpark Road in north Belfast, with Andre Shoukri among the mourners.

The day after the killing a 42-year-old, later identified by the Sunday Life and the Irish News as Stephen "Steeky" Robinson, an associate of UDA South Belfast brigade leader Jackie McDonald, was arrested in north Belfast on suspicion of involvement. However, Robinson was released without charge.

On 15 September 2016, three other men were charged with perverting the course of justice in relation to Boreland's killing.

Preceded by Ihab Shoukri	Ulster Defence Association North Belfast Brigadier; 2003–2004	Succeeded by Andre Shoukri
