= Tommy English (loyalist) =

Northern Irish politician (1960–2000)

Tommy English

Thomas English (1960 – 31 October 2000), usually known as Tommy English, was an Ulster loyalist paramilitary and politician. He served as a commander in the Ulster Defence Association (UDA) and was killed by members of the Ulster Volunteer Force (UVF) as part of a violent loyalist feud between the two organisations. English had also been noted as a leading figure in the Ulster Democratic Party (UDP) during the early years of the Northern Ireland peace process.

== Ulster Defence Association ==
From an early age, English was involved in the North Belfast Brigade of the Ulster Defence Association (UDA), a loyalist paramilitary group. After his death, the Belfast Telegraph described him as a "UDA commander", while the BBC described him as a "paramilitary chief".

English also became involved in the political wing of the movement, the Ulster Democratic Party (UDP), becoming its chairman. He stood for the UDP in North Belfast in the 1996 Northern Ireland Forum election, and was also placed eighth on the party's top-up list, but he was not elected. He was active on behalf of the party in the discussions which led to the Good Friday Agreement. A noted critic of the Democratic Unionist Party (DUP) during his political career, English gained notoriety for an appearance at a UDA rally in the Ulster Hall in Belfast when he took to the stage wearing an Ian Paisley mask and a clerical dog collar and proceeded to lampoon the DUP leader. He was a regular visitor to conferences and events at the Glencree Centre for Peace and Reconciliation and was close to Republic of Ireland peace activists Paul Burton and Chris Hudson, visiting the site of the Battle of the Somme with them in 1999. On St Patrick's Day 1998 he met President of the USA Bill Clinton in Washington, D.C., as part of the UDP delegation visiting the US capital. He hit the headlines in 1997 when he was given a bravery award after breaking down the front door of a burning house and bringing the occupier out to safety.

Alongside his political activism he remained involved in the paramilitary side of the UDA and played a leading role in orchestrating riots at two interface areas in north Belfast i.e. the Limestone Road - which divides Catholic Newington and Protestant Tigers Bay - and the Whitewell Road. English and his family lived in Tiger's Bay before moving to Newtownabbey at an unspecified period so as to "give our kids a chance so they could have a decent life" according to his wife Doreen.

English left the UDP in 1998 after making a public statement against the Orange Order at a time when the party was widely supporting them in their attempts to march in Catholic areas. English also claimed that he had been the subject of allegations about misappropriating money in the UDA and stated that, whilst the allegations were not widely believed by the group's leadership, worries about them had led him to attempt suicide and seek treatment in a psychiatric hospital.

In 1999, he was arrested on suspicion of headbutting and kicking a patron of the Crows Nest bar, having allegedly arrived with three associates armed with baseball bats, breaking glasses along the bar. The case was still outstanding, with English awaiting charges, at the time of his death.

== Killing ==
On 31 October 2000, English was fatally shot at his home in Ballyfore Gardens, on the Ballyduff estate in Newtownabbey, by a group of four men. His three children were inside the house at about 18.30 when the men entered through the back door as his wife, Doreen was preparing food for a Halloween party. She called out to her husband and attempted to close the door but they pushed past her, one of the men shouting "Get out of the fucking way, Doreen". She kept trying to intervene in an effort to protect English, but she received several hard blows, mostly in the head, and her skull was fractured. English was shot several times as he lay face down in the hallway of his home; the last shot struck him in the lower back. He was rushed to Belfast's Royal Victoria Hospital where he died shortly afterwards.

The murder was blamed on the Ulster Volunteer Force (UVF), who at the time were involved in a violent dispute with the UDA. At his funeral, his coffin was covered in UDA flags, and it was accompanied by men in paramilitary uniforms. Among the mourners was a member of the UVF who was closely related to English. Sympathy notices placed in the local press at the time included one from Johnny Adair, who described English as a "good and faithful servant".

English's murder was said to have been in retaliation for the killing of UVF veteran Bertie Rice earlier that same day. The UDA killed Mark Quail, a 26-year-old UVF member, at his Rathcoole home in retaliation on the following day, with Quail the seventh and final man killed as part of the loyalist feud. David "Candy" Greer, a UDA member killed in the feud three days before English, had been a close friend from English's days in Tiger's Bay. English was initially described in press reports as a relative of UDP colleague and former South East Antrim brigadier Joe English, although this was later corrected as the two were not related.

Ten men were put on trial for the murder of English, including UVF North Belfast commander Mark Haddock. However, nine were acquitted of all charges, while the tenth was convicted only of "possessing items intended for terrorism". Following the acquittals, his widow announced that she would be suing police for failing to take action against an informant who was involved in a number of UVF murders in north Belfast.
