= Jimbo Simpson =

Northern Irish paramilitarian (died 2018)

James "Jimbo" Simpson, also known as the Bacardi Brigadier, (died 11 October 2018) was a Northern Irish loyalist paramilitary. He was most noted for his time as Brigadier of the North Belfast Ulster Defence Association (UDA). After falling from grace, Simpson spent a number of years outside Northern Ireland. He returned to Belfast in 2014 in a move related to an ongoing loyalist feud.

== Early years ==
Simpson, a native of the Tiger's Bay area of north Belfast, joined the UDA in the early 1970s, claiming later that he did so as he felt that "there was no one to defend our streets from republicans in the New Lodge [a neighbouring Catholic district]".

He would go on to assume command of the North Belfast brigade, making him one of the six Inner Council members that led the UDA. He had taken over from Brigadier Tom Reid, who in his turn had succeeded Davy Payne following the latter's arrest in 1988. In 1991, he was shot five times during a protest which escalated into the 2004 Dublin Riot. This attack left him hospitalized for six months.

== Brigadier ==
Simpson was, along with Jackie McDonald, John Gregg and Billy McFarland, one of the brigadiers on stage during Johnny Adair's "Loyalist Day of Culture" on the Lower Shankill on 19 August 2000.

In a move that Simpson and the other brigadiers were unaware of, Adair used the day as the starting point for a bloody loyalist feud with the Ulster Volunteer Force (UVF). For his part Simpson was reluctant to join the fight against the UVF but many within his brigade admired Adair and some became openly involved in the feud, not least David Greer, who had been involved in the Loyalist Day of Culture when Adair's men attacked the UVF stronghold, the Rex Bar. Greer was killed by the North Belfast UVF on Mountcollyer Street on 28 October whilst two days later the Tiger's Bay UDA retaliated by killing Herbert Rice, a 63-year-old Progressive Unionist Party (PUP) activist who had been in the UVF in the late 1960s.

Tommy English, an Ulster Democratic Party (UDP) spokesman and veteran street-fighter, was killed by the UVF that same night in Newtownabbey, and before long John Gregg's UDA South East Antrim Brigade joined the growing feud.

By the early years of the 21st century, Simpson's control in north Belfast had become nominal as the brigade had witnessed an influx of young members who were attracted by Adair's militancy. They were loyal to the West Belfast brigadier rather than Simpson.

One of the activities he was able to organise was a pipe bomb campaign, combined with large-scale rioting, along the boundaries between Tiger's Bay and the New Lodge throughout 2000 and 2001. Simpson believed that Catholics were attempting to encroach on Protestant territory, largely due to the overcrowding on the New Lodge and the presence of many empty houses in Tiger's Bay. Sinn Féin's North Belfast spokesman, Gerry Kelly, had called on the Northern Ireland Housing Executive to move the peace lines to build new housing for Catholics, a statement Simpson regarded as provocative.

One of his last acts as brigadier was part of the Holy Cross dispute in which loyalists began to picket a Catholic primary school in Ardoyne. Several residents of Glenbryn who had been involved in the protests filed suits against the Royal Ulster Constabulary (RUC), alleging heavy-handed treatment. In response to the claims, Simpson issued a statement claiming that if this treatment continued then the police and their families would be targeted by the North Belfast UDA. A subsequent statement claimed that the targeting would take the form of protests outside their houses rather than paramilitary attacks, although it also underlined that the policemen's families in particular would be made to "pay the price".

== Removal ==
Simpson, who had long borne the nickname "The Bacardi Brigadier" because of his voracious appetite for alcohol, was described as a "sad shambling figure" by the Belfast News Letter. His drunken rages had also become more frequent, and in one incident he even had to be forcibly ejected from the Mount Inn after he threw a set of pool balls around the bar, damaging a toilet door. His violent mood swings became a feature of life in his Tiger's Bay stronghold, where intimidation and petty violence became rife, whilst he also co-ordinated a network of protection rackets and supported his wife "Tootsie" in her large-scale fencing operation.

Simpson was finally deposed by the pro-Adair wing in mid-2002 and, following a personal recommendation from a freshly released from prison Adair, the Inner Council endorsed Andre Shoukri as his successor. Shoukri's physical takeover proved surprisingly easy: with guns borrowed from Adair he and his followers stood Simpson down without firing a shot, Simpson being apparently relieved to be leaving the position.

Andre Shoukri and his brother Ihab both had brief spells as brigadier before being imprisoned leading to the appointment of William "Bonzer" Borland, a former footballer with Linfield, to the role in 2003. Sensing that Borland, who had little background in the UDA, was a weak replacement, Simpson began to openly criticise his lack of experience and made a play to regain command for himself. On 13 October 2003 around forty of Simpson's closest allies in the UDA went on the rampage in the Ballysillan and Glenbryn estates attacking houses and shops owned by Borland supporters before attempting, unsuccessfully, to kidnap the new brigadier. The attempted coup was not a success and several of Simpson's men found themselves the victims of punishment shootings soon afterwards.

According to David McKittrick Simpson's attempted coup had also been inspired by his reluctance to hand over part of the proceeds of a £5000 robbery in which he had been involved to the new North Belfast leadership.

South Belfast brigadier Jackie McDonald, who had emerged as the UDA's leading figure after forcing Adair out of Northern Ireland earlier in the year, stepped in as he felt that the image presented by Simpson in his final years as brigadier was one that was too damaging to the UDA to be allowed to resume. He led the Inner Council in condemning the actions of Simpson and in ordering him to leave Belfast and not return. A subsequent letter from Simpson's supporters to the North Belfast leadership warned that they would be back to regain control.

Simpson himself was reported as having fled to England with the proceeds of the robbery.

In 2014, it was reported in the Belfast Telegraph that Simpson had returned to Northern Ireland and was living under the protection of the UDA West Belfast Brigade. The Brigade, which was involved in machinations against the leadership of John Bunting in North Belfast, were reported to be considering attempting to return Simpson to power.

Simpson died of lung cancer on 11 October 2018 at his home in Shankhill Road, west Belfast, at the age of 60. He was buried at Carnmoney Cemetery in County Antrim.

Other offices
Preceded by Tom Reid	Ulster Defence Association North Belfast Brigadier; 1990s–2002	Succeeded by Andre Shoukri
