= John Bunting (loyalist) =

Northern Irish Loyalist paramilitary leader and activist

John Bunting (born c. 1967) is a Northern Irish loyalist paramilitary leader and activist. As of 2014 Bunting is the head of the North Belfast Brigade of the Ulster Defence Association (UDA) and thus a member of the Inner Council that controls the organisation.

== Early years ==
Bunting first came to wider prominence in 2004 as a close associate of Sammy Duddy. Bunting frequently joined Duddy in his capacity as a spokesman for the North Belfast UDA, featuring regularly at press conferences and media engagements. Like Duddy, Bunting was a native of the Westland estate, a loyalist enclave close to the Antrim Road. A community worker, Bunting was a member of the North Belfast Ulster Political Research Group (UPRG) and also acted as spokesman for Ihab Shoukri around this time. He was also involved in talks with local leaders from neighbouring nationalist areas in an attempt to reduce tensions at North Belfast's numerous interface areas.

== Brigadier ==
In 2006 the wider UDA decided to expel Ihab and Andre Shoukri due to allegations of criminal activity. Bunting was the surprising choice as new North Belfast brigadier and he soon became associated with the mainstream tendency within the UDA as represented by Jackie McDonald, Billy McFarland and Jimmy Birch. This association put him at loggerheads with the renegade UDA South East Antrim Brigade and in 2007 he was forced to flee his home in Ballyclare, a part of that brigade's area, after threats were made to his life.

As brigadier he ensured that his brigade took part in decommissioning of weapons and invited the Independent Monitoring Commission to meet with him and other north Belfast leaders in 2010 after claims that the UDA were expelling residents from the Tiger's Bay area.

== 2013 North Belfast Brigade feud ==
In 2013 it was reported in the Belfast Telegraph that the UDA West Belfast Brigade had become so associated with criminality and racketeering that the three other Belfast-based brigadiers, Jackie McDonald (South Belfast), Jimmy Birch (East Belfast) and Bunting (North Belfast), no longer felt able to deal with the western leadership. Tensions had been further stoked by a graffiti campaign against Bunting's leadership on the York Road, in which expelled members of the North Belfast Brigade, who had come under the wing of their counterparts in the west, called for Bunting's removal as brigadier. The feud was confirmed in December 2013 when a UDA statement was released acknowledging the existence of a dissident tendency within the North Belfast Brigade but confirming support for Bunting's leadership. However, whilst the statement was signed by McDonald and Birch, no representative of the West Belfast Brigade had added their signature. The north Belfast rebels subsequently named Robert Molyneaux, a convicted killer and former friend of Bunting's closest ally John Howcroft, as their preferred choice for Brigadier. Bunting's opponents criticised his alleged heavy-handed approach, particularly towards Tiger's Bay residents, whilst his supporters claimed that Bunting's attempts to tackle the drugs trade in the area were the real reason behind the attempts to remove him.

As the feud rumbled on Bunting became a target for a number of attacks. In May 2014 Bunting was attacked in Tiger's Bay by a group of opponents. During the brawl Bunting was knocked unconscious and had his mobile phone stolen. Bunting had been visiting the home of one of his internal critics at the time of the incident. In August 2014 as Bunting drove along Duncairn Gardens, a street separating Tiger's Bay from the republican New Lodge area his car was damaged by a pipe bomb thrown at it. Tiger's Bay had emerged as the stronghold of the anti-Bunting faction.

Soon after the latter attack former North Belfast brigadier William Borland, who had become associated with the pro-Molyneaux wing, was attacked with a breeze block and shot in the leg close to his home in Carr's Glen. Following the attack both Bunting and Howcroft were arrested on suspicion of involvement. Along with another associate they were charged with attempting to murder Borland and Andre Shoukri and were remanded in custody. As is standard within the UDA whilst in custody Bunting had to relinquish his role as brigadier although his replacement, a close friend of McDonald's from Taughmonagh in south Belfast identified only as the "Burger King Brigadier" due to his weight, has been reported as merely a figurehead with no actual power. Subsequent reports indicated this brigadier had lasted only two weeks before McDonald replaced him with an unidentified former member of the Loyalist Volunteer Force.

In September 2014 it was reported in the Belfast Telegraph that the leaders of the UDA in North, East and South Belfast, as well as the head of the Londonderry and North Antrim Brigade had met to discuss the feud as well as the schism with the West Belfast Brigade. According to the report they agreed that West Belfast Brigade members loyal to the wider UDA should establish a new command structure for the brigade which would then take the lead in ousting Mo Courtney, Jim Spence and Eric McKee from their existing leadership positions. It was also stated that the West Belfast breakaway leaders had recruited Jimbo Simpson, a former North Belfast brigadier driven out of Northern Ireland over a decade earlier, and were seeking to restore him to his former role. This followed the rejection of earlier overtures to West Belfast brigadier Matt Kincaid as he opted to back Spence and Courtney.

The charges against Bunting were dropped in 2015 after a number of witnesses withdrew their statements, although Bunting did not return as brigadier, his place having been taken by "Big" Bill Hill, a dissident who had been prominent in the Belfast City Hall flag protests. However this new leadership also began a feud with the Ulster Volunteer Force (UVF) group in Mount Vernon, a move which was not endorsed by their previous allies in West Belfast. In August 2016 the new leader was reported as having fled to Scotland due to the threat of the Mount Vernon UVF. John Boreland was shot dead soon after this.

In October 2016 it was reported that South Belfast brigadier Jackie McDonald had installed Sam "Bib" Blair, a White City-based veteran who had been kneecapped by supporters of the Shoukris in 2003 after attempting to oust them from the leadership, as the new brigadier. Blair attempted to shore up his position by recruiting former allies of Bunting to his side, having reportedly been only sixth choice for the role with several more prominent figures turning down the job as a "poisoned chalice". However by June 2017 it was reported that the UDA in North Belfast had disintegrated into three sections: Blair's supporters, a group of dissidents in Tiger's Bay and a further group in Boreland's former stronghold of Ballysillan.
