= Jimmy Birch =

Northern Irish loyalist

- Born: James Birch; January 1st 1970
- Years active: c. 1987–
- Organization: Ulster Defence Association
- Known for: Loyalist
- Title: UDA East Belfast Brigadier
- Term: 2005–2018
- Predecessor: Jim Gray
- Successor: Incumbent

Jimmy Birch (born c. 1970) is a Northern Irish loyalist paramilitary leader and activist.

== Brigadier ==
Birch joined the UDA as a 17-year-old and during his long affiliation with loyalist terror groups he was never imprisoned, in contrast to many other loyalists. Birch became Brigadier in 2005, after the flamboyant Jim Gray was expelled from the organisation for "treason". As leader, Birch initially purged the East Belfast UDA of the "Spice Boys", a flamboyant group of racketeers close to Gray. This was later relaxed, with William Murphy in particular welcomed back into the fold.

He initially opposed decommissioning and had reportedly told a meeting of East Belfast UDA members that their weapons would not be handed in. Subsequently, however, Birch revised his position and a cache of East Belfast Brigade weapons were given up for decommissioning.

== Political development ==
Birch was critical of the Belfast City Hall flag protests when Ulster loyalist protesters caused widespread disruption after the temporary removal of the Union Flag from Belfast City Hall. He stated that the vote had been part of a democratic process and claimed that loyalist rioters were allowing themselves to be "played" by Sinn Féin. Birch and his close ally David Stitt advocated a move by the UDA towards working more closely with the Democratic Unionist Party (DUP) to engage more closely with politics.

Birch is a close friend of Sam "Chalky" White, a DUP activist in east Belfast and former UDA prisoner. He was in attendance as an Ulster Political Research Group representative at the inaugural meeting of the Unionist Forum, a task force established by Peter Robinson and Mike Nesbitt in the aftermath of the City Hall flag vote.

Birch sits on the board of the east Belfast charity Charter NI. The charity is chaired by Dee Stitt, a close ally of Jackie McDonald and convicted armed robber who is head of the UDA in North Down and number two to Birch in the East Belfast Brigade. In late 2016 the charity was chosen to manage £1.7 million of money from the Social Investment Fund to be spent in east Belfast, a move that attracted controversy due to the prominent role the UDA plays in the charity.

== North Belfast Brigade feud ==
Birch has been associated with the mainstream tendency within the UDA and has maintained close relations with fellow brigadiers Jackie McDonald, Billy McFarland and John Bunting. In 2013 this tendency broke relations with the UDA West Belfast Brigade and accused it of interfering in a developing loyalist feud in North Belfast where Bunting's leadership was coming under internal pressure. Individually Birch had a long-standing disagreement with his opposite number in West Belfast, Matt Kincaid, over allegations relating to the theft of weapons by West Belfast Brigade members from an East Belfast Brigade cache. According to reports Birch and Kincaid had a public argument in an east Belfast carpark over the claims in 2012.
