= UDA West Belfast Brigade =

Ulster organised crime group

The UDA West Belfast Brigade is the section of the Ulster loyalist paramilitary group, the Ulster Defence Association (UDA), based in the western quarter of Belfast, in the Greater Shankill area. Initially a battalion, the West Belfast Brigade emerged from the local "defence associations" active in the Shankill at the beginning of the Troubles and became the first section to be officially designated as a separate entity within the wider UDA structure. During the 1970s and 1980s the West Belfast Brigade was involved in a series of killings as well as establishing a significant presence as an outlet for racketeering.

The brigade reached the apex of its notoriety during the 1990s when Johnny Adair emerged as its leading figure. Under Adair's direction the West Belfast Brigade in general and its sub-unit "C Company" in particular became associated with a killing spree in the neighbouring Catholic nationalist districts of West Belfast. With Adair and his supporters suspicious of the developing Northern Ireland peace process and the Combined Loyalist Military Command ceasefire of 1994, the West Belfast Brigade increasingly came to operate as a rogue group within the UDA, feuding with rival loyalists in the Ulster Volunteer Force before splitting from the UDA altogether in late 2002. Ultimately Adair was forced out and the brigade was brought back into the mainstream UDA. It continues to organise, albeit with less significance than in its heyday. Matt Kincaid is the incumbent West Belfast Brigade leader and under his leadership the brigade has again become estranged from the wider UDA.

== Origins ==
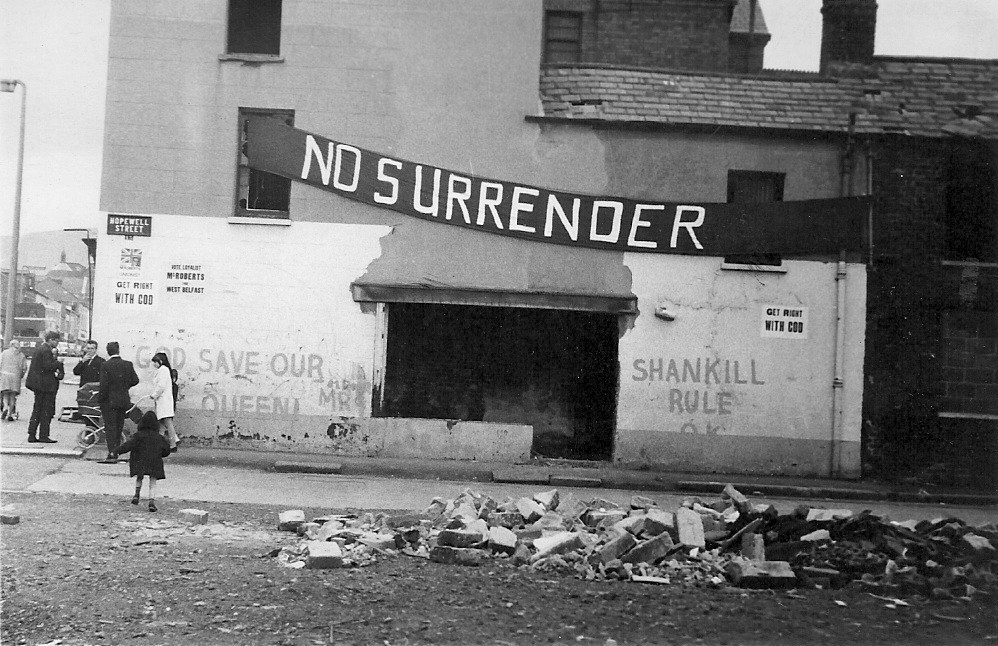
The Shankill Road neighbourhood of Belfast, as it appeared in the early 1970s

The origins of the UDA lay in west Belfast with the formation of vigilante groups such as the Shankill Defence Association and the Woodvale Defence Association. The latter, formed by Charles Harding Smith, became the largest of a number of similar groups and was instrumental in the establishment of the UDA in September 1971, having begun military training of its members two months earlier. In 1972, when Jim Anderson was serving as acting chairman of the UDA, a West Belfast battalion was formed as a separate part of the UDA, such was the volume of membership within the area. The battalion was divided into three separate companies: A Company, which was based on the Highfield estate with some members in Glencairn, B Company which covered the Woodvale area, and C Company for the Shankill Road itself. Battalions covering the other three areas of Belfast as well as South East Antrim and North Antrim and Londonderry were formed soon afterwards and before long these were re-designated as brigades after the UDA experienced a rush of members.

== Charles Harding Smith ==
The battalion fell under the initial control of Davy Fogel, under whose leadership the group undertook a programme of erecting barricades between the Shankill and the neighbouring republican Falls and Springfield Roads. However, the local strongman was Harding Smith, who had been held in prison on charges of gun-running in London. When he returned in early 1973 Harding Smith ran Fogel out of the area and became commander of the battalion himself, whilst also becoming joint chairman of the UDA as a whole with Anderson.

Harding Smith soon became embroiled in a feud with East Belfast leader Tommy Herron, whilst also facing a growing rival in his own area in the shape of Andy Tyrie, the commander of A Company. Tyrie was chosen as the overall Chairman of the UDA in 1973, with Anderson off the scene. Tyrie had initially been seen as a compromise candidate between the two real powerhouses of Harding Smith and Herron but before long he began to assert his independence. Herron was killed in late 1973 and soon after Tyrie and Harding Smith became openly hostile after Tyrie sanctioned a trip by UDA activists to Libya. Harding Smith publicly condemned the move, arguing that Libyan leader Muammar Gaddafi was a friend of the Provisional IRA, and in January 1975 he announced the secession of the West Belfast Brigade from the UDA. However, after a power struggle Harding Smith was driven out of Northern Ireland following two failed attempts on his life, according to Peter Taylor by one of Tyrie's men. The West Belfast Brigade immediately returned to the mainstream UDA fold.

The west Belfast area also saw the formation in 1973 of the Ulster Freedom Fighters (UFF) by former Harding Smith ally John White. Modelled on the Red Hand Commando, the UFF was to be an armed elite of killing units to be nominally separate from the legal UDA but actually a flag of convenience under which UDA members could kill Catholics. The model soon spread from west Belfast to the rest of the UDA.

== Tommy Lyttle ==
When Harding Smith left Northern Ireland in 1975 Tommy Lyttle was chosen as his replacement as Brigadier, following a brief interlude during which John McClatchey served as leader. Under Lyttle however the West Belfast Brigade entered a period of stagnation and from being the main area of activity it fell way behind the new centres of North and South Belfast. A rare foray into murder by a member of the brigade proved somewhat disastrous during the 1977 Ulster Workers' Council strike. Kenny McClinton stopped a bus as part of a road blockade and entering the vehicle, shot and killed driver Harry Bradshaw, a Protestant. This, along with press revelations that the UDA had written a letter of apology to his widow in which they enclosed a ten-pound note, helped to further undermine the already unpopular strike. During the 1980s James Craig, another former associate of Harding Smith, had been attached to the West Belfast Brigade as "fundraiser-in-chief", a role which saw the brigade move increasingly towards racketeering. Craig particularly favoured protection rackets that targeted Belfast's building firms and gained a lot of money through these, both for the brigade and for himself. Arrested in 1985 for racketeering, the case collapsed and he returned to the Shankill but was soon asked to leave because of his personal enrichment and he left to link up the John McMichael's South Belfast Brigade instead. According to Billy McQuiston, a member of the West Belfast Brigade, the activities of the brigade during the 1980s helped to make the UDA unpopular on the Shankill as they were identified with gangsterism.

Despite this the West Belfast Brigade saw an influx of new young members in the 1980s and before long Lyttle came under pressure to give them something to do. Lyttle shared Craig's predilection for gangsterism but was less interested in murder and so turned to his intelligence officer Brian Nelson who drew up a list of leading republican targets and October 1987 Nelson dispatched a group of raw recruits to the nationalist Ballymurphy area to kill the first of these, a 66-year-old taxi driver by the name of Francisco Notorantonio. Despite appearing on the list Notorantonio had only ever been very loosely connected to the Irish Republican Army and Sinn Féin and had ended his active associations with republicanism several years earlier. In fact Nelson, who was the highest-ranking British intelligence agent in the UDA, had seized on Notorantonio at the last minute after being informed by his handlers that his initial first target was actually a high-ranking British agent in the Provisional Irish Republican Army known as "Stakeknife" (believed to be Freddie Scappaticci). "Stakeknife" was seen as much too important to be killed and so a last minute switch was made. Nonetheless, the killings continued, with C Company becoming the most active, under the command of William "Winkie" Dodds. They struck again, based on Nelson's list, on 10 May 1988 with the murder of Terence McDaid. This murder however was an error as the actual target had been his older brother Declan, whose striking physical resemblance to Terence meant that C Company had received the wrong photograph from Nelson. Nelson also provided details on Gerard Slane, who was killed by B Company on 22 September 1988. Slane was shot dead at his Falls Road home with the UDA claiming he was a member of the Irish People's Liberation Organisation. The most notorious killing was that of solicitor Pat Finucane in February 1989, carried out by brigade member Ken Barrett using information provided by RUC Special Branch.

Lyttle was arrested as part of the Stevens Inquiries and was handed a six-year prison sentence after pleading guilty to various offences. It has been suggested that the lenience of his sentence may have been influenced by Lyttle himself being a Royal Ulster Constabulary agent although this has not been confirmed. The collapse of the old leadership cleared the way for younger, more militant members to take control of the brigade and launch a new era of activity.

== Emergence of Johnny Adair ==
The Stevens Inquiries led to a period of chaos within the West Belfast Brigade, with a rapid succession of brigadiers and a number of leading members spending time in prison. Lyttle's arrest in early 1990 saw him relinquish the role of Brigadier, whilst the allegations that he was an informer saw him disowned by the rest of the brigade with four others following him before the year was out. Stability initially looked set when Tommy Irvine was chosen as Brigadier and he set in place a new decentralised structure in which the commanders of A, B and C companies (at the time Matt Kincaid, Jim Spence and William "Winkie" Dodds respectively) would be given a freer hand in their activities. However Irvine was arrested as part of the inquiries in August 1990 and was very briefly replaced by Ken Barrett. Barrett was quickly ousted by Lyttle's choice, his brother-in-law Billy Kennedy but in October 1990 Jim Spence, who had also been taken into prison as part of the Stevens Inquires, assumed overall control of the brigade. One of his first acts was to appoint an officer in overall control of the brigade's military activities and he chose his friend Johnny Adair for this role. Adair also replaced Dodds, who faced a longer spell in prison, as head of C Company.

Under Adair's direction the West Belfast Brigade became notorious for its killing spree, with his leading gunman Stephen "Top Gun" McKeag in particular becoming notorious. His first killing had actually occurred before the emergence of Adair on 11 March 1990 in the Clonard district of the Falls Road. Several more followed however with police estimated that McKeag committed at least 12 murders and former members of C Company putting the figure even higher.

=== Adair in charge ===
Spence was arrested on charges of extortion in March 1993 and gave up the role of Brigadier with Johnny Adair succeeding him. As Brigadier, Adair continued on the same bloody path that he had followed as military commander. One victim was Noel Cardwell, a mentally sub-normal glass collector at a C Company bar, the Diamond Jubilee, who was seen as a figure of fun by Adair and his cohorts. In December 1993 Cardwell was taken to the Royal Victoria Hospital, Belfast after suffering a bad reaction when his drink was spiked with an ecstasy tablet by a member of C Company. Whilst in the hospital he was visited by members of the RUC who asked him who he had been drinking with. Cardwell named the UDA members he was with, having failed to grasp the code of secrecy governing the UDA. In order to send a message to informers, Adair had Cardwell abducted following his release from hospital and subjected to a long and brutal interrogation process. He was shot and left to bleed to death. C Company member Gary McMaster was later sentenced to life imprisonment for his part in the murder. Adair and his close ally Dodds were targeted by the IRA in October 1993 when republican intelligence witnessed the two entering Frizzell's fish shop on the Shankill Road to access West Belfast Brigade headquarters in the room above. The Shankill Road bombing that followed killed nine civilians and one of the bombers but Adair and Dodds had already left by the time the bomb detonated.

McKeag, a highly placed British state agent was given a licence to kill. McKeag has been suspected in the murders of Sinn Féin member Peter Gallagher on 24th March and Damien Walsh on 25th March. On 1 May 1993 former IRA member Alan Lundy was killed Ardoyne. Sean Lavery, the son of a Sinn Féin Belfast City Councillor, was killed on 8 August with Marie Teresa Dowds de Mogollon killed on 30 August. and Sean Hughes killed at his Donegall Road shop on 7 September. McKeag was tried for the latter murder but was acquitted due to lack of evidence. Michael Edwards was killed in Finaghy on 3 September and Paddy Mahon on 15 October before McKeag was finally arrested in connection with the Hughes murder. McKeag was soon back in action and by 1994 Dodds was close to Derek Adgey, a Royal Marine who provided details of republicans to Dodds that were then used by C Company, in particular their leading gunman McKeag. McKeag would fall out of favour later in the decade, in part because of envy within C Company of his "achievements", and he was found dead in suspicious circumstances in September 2000.

On 16 May 1994 around twenty leading figures in C Company were arrested as part of an RUC operation against the notorious group. Although a number of those arrested were released without charge, Adair was imprisoned, forcing him to vacate his role as Brigadier. His close ally Winkie Dodds was named his replacement, although Adair remained in control as Dodds followed the orders he sent out from prison. Following Adair's lead, Dodds expanded the drug-dealing empire that the West Belfast Brigade had begun to develop. Adair also pursued a policy of linking up with the Loyalist Volunteer Force (LVF) and following the Irish National Liberation Army's killing of LVF leader Billy Wright in December 1997, he sent McKeag out to wreak revenge, despite the UDA being on ceasefire. McKeag struck on 31st Dec by machine-gunning the Clifton Tavern in north Belfast, killing Edmund Trainor and injuring several others. He followed this on 23 January 1998 by kiinllg Liam Conway on north Belfast's Hesketh Road. The Inner Council of the UDA brought McKeag to task for this killing but he was not disciplined, despite the murder seeing the Ulster Democratic Party left out of all-party talks. The West Belfast Brigade meanwhile continued to assort freely with the LVF, a splinter group of the Ulster Volunteer Force (UVF) and a bitter rival of that group, active alongside LVF members at the Drumcree conflict. Under Adair the West Belfast Brigade moved closer to a feud with the UVF.

== Feud with UVF ==
On 19 August 2000 the West Belfast Brigade hosted a "Loyalist Day of Culture" organised by Adair on the Lower Shankill with fellow brigadiers John Gregg, Billy McFarland, Jackie McDonald and Jimbo Simpson in attendance. However early in the day clashes broke out between UDA and UVF members outside the Diamond Jubilee, a UDA bar, and later UDA members attacked the UVF stronghold Rex Bar further up the road, firing shots at the UVF men trapped inside. In response, Adair drove all UVF members and their families out of the Lower Shankill and in doing so began the feud that his fellow brigadiers had hoped to avoid. Orders were sent up to A Company in Highfield by Dodds that the estate should be "cleansed" of UVF members. The UVF struck back on 21 August, killing two of Adair's allies, Jackie Coulter and Bobby Mahood, on the Crumlin Road. In response C Company members burned down the headquarters of the UVF-linked Progressive Unionist Party. Adair was arrested on 22 August 2000 whilst he and Dodds were driving down the Shankill Road. Adair was sent back to prison for breaking terms of his parole. With command reverting to Dodds, UVF member Samuel Rockett was shot and killed at his home by C Company the following night. The feud continued with 4 more being killed on both sides until an uneasy truce was made.

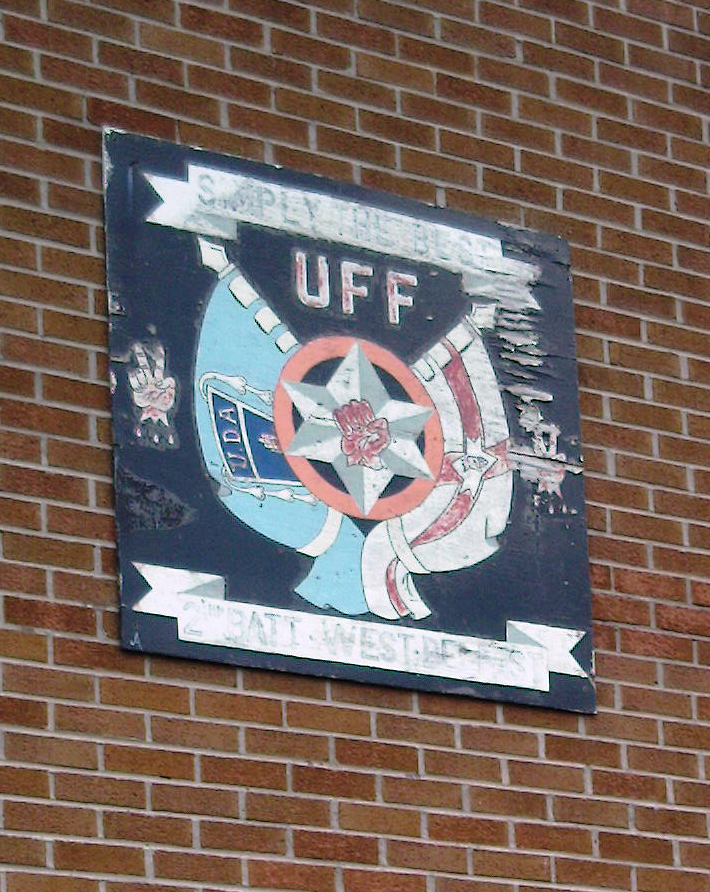
D Company plaque on Bangor's Bloomfield estate

The militancy of the West Belfast Brigade, and in particular Adair, who had become a cult hero among loyalists, meant that the brigade enjoyed the loyalty of some UDA members outside its nominal geographic area. Within the North Belfast Brigade an influx of new young members found more to admire in Adair than in their own brigadier Jimbo Simpson, and affiliated to the West Belfast brigade despite not living in the area. Further afield a group of Shankill men had relocated to areas of North Down such as Bangor and Newtownards and there had found that support amongst young loyalists for Adair was so strong that they established a new D Company for the West Belfast Brigade there. The area was supposed to be part of the jurisdiction of the East Belfast Brigade.

== Adair denouncement ==
=== Expulsion ===
The feud had been unpopular with the other brigadiers, in particular Jackie McDonald of the South Belfast Brigade, who had emerged as the most credible rival to Adair within the UDA. Adair sought to restart the UVF feud and challenge his fellow brigadiers in September 2002, when East Belfast LVF member Stephen Warnock was killed by the Red Hand Commando. Adair spread a rumour that East Belfast Brigade chief Jim Gray had actually been behind the murder and as a result Gray was shot and seriously injured when he came to the Warnock family home to commiserate soon afterwards. A meeting was convened of all brigadiers in an attempt to avert a crisis, but nothing came of it as Adair refused to bend. McDonald's men followed Adair and reported that he conferred with his LVF allies in Ballysillan after leaving the meeting early. On this basis McDonald secured the agreement of the other brigadiers that Adair should be expelled from the UDA, along with his spokesman John White.

Adair ignored the expulsion and erected "West Belfast UDA - Business as Usual" banners on the Shankill Road. A coterie of figures within the West Belfast Brigade, and especially Adair's C Company stronghold, remained loyal to Adair as the West Belfast Brigade split off from the rest of the UDA. However, Adair's leadership now became characterised by extreme paranoia. Mo Courtney, who served as Adair's bodyguard, was amongst those to come under suspicion because of his friendship with the North Belfast-based Shoukri brothers, whom Adair viewed as potential rivals. Adair despatched a team to kill Courtney but his friend Donald Hodgen tipped him off and Courtney escaped the Shankill before the hit could take place. Winkie Dodds, whose role had diminished considerably after a stroke, also split from Adair around this time after his cousin William "Muggsy" Mullan had been driven from the Shankill for associating with the Shoukris and "Fat" Jackie Thompson had led a punishment squad in a brutal attack on Dodds' brother Milton "Doddsy" Dodds.

=== Escalation and exile ===
The feud erupted on 27 December 2002 when members of the West Belfast Brigade killed mainstream UDA member Jonathan Stewart at a party, an attack that saw Adair loyalist Roy Green killed in retaliation. Adair's men then struck back on 1 February 2003, killing South East Antrim Brigade leader John Gregg and his friend Rab Carson as the two returned from watching Rangers F.C. Gregg's killing proved the final straw, in part because he enjoyed a stellar reputation amongst loyalists for a gun attack on Gerry Adams in the 1980s. Adair however had a lot of bad blood with Gregg, stemming from an attack on a West Belfast Brigade member in Rathcoole and the subsequent kneecapping of the attackers by Adair's men in Gregg's area. In December 2002, the LVF had placed a bomb under Gregg's car and soon afterwards Gregg's house and that of his ally Tommy Kirkham were attacked by West Belfast men. Gregg retaliated with a bomb attack on Adair's house on 8 January, two days before the West Belfast Brigade chief was returned to jail. "Fat" Jackie Thompson, who remained totally loyal to Adair, was chosen to take over as Brigadier whilst Adair was in jail.

McDonald made contact with A and B Companies of the West Belfast Brigade and told them that he intended to forcibly remove Adair. They accepted McDonald's leadership and established a headquarters at the Shankill's Heather Street Social Club, where members of C Company were invited in order to defect back to the mainstream UDA. Several members did so, with Mo Courtney amongst the most prominent of those to accept the invitation. Around 100 of McDonald's men, all heavily armed, launched an invasion of Adair's Lower Shankill stronghold in the early hours of the morning of 6 February and attacked the twenty or so members of C Company who remained loyal to Adair (who was still in prison), driving them out of Northern Ireland. As a result of this, the West Belfast Brigade was brought back into the UDA.

== Post-Adair ==
In the immediate aftermath of Adair's removal, and with Thompson one of those to have been driven out of Northern Ireland, Mo Courtney was officially confirmed in the role of brigadier. He proved a transitory figure however, as a result of the murder of Adair supporter Alan McCullough. McCullough had asked Courtney if he could return from exile in Bolton and promised to tell the new brigadier the location of a large drugs stash and the home address of Gina Adair in return for his safety. Courtney agreed but when McCullough returned home he was taken by UDA members to Mallusk near Templepatrick and killed on 28 May 2003. The killing was hugely unpopular due to the double-crossing nature of the attack and Courtney went into hiding in Carrickfergus for fear of retaliation. He was charged with the murder, along with Ihab Shoukri, a few days later. He was acquitted by a Diplock court after the evidence was adjudged flawed, although a retrial was later ordered and he was ultimately given an eight-year jail sentence after pleading guilty to manslaughter.

Jim Spence, who had conspired with McDonald to bring about Adair's downfall, replaced Courtney as Brigadier following his arrest. Adair, who was mooting a comeback from prison, attacked Spence constantly in the press for his perceived treachery, although ultimately Adair left Belfast following his 2005 release. Seen as something of an undesirable by others in the UDA, Spence was removed as Brigadier in 2006 in favour of Matt Kincaid. As of 2015, Kincaid remains in charge of the now much less influential West Belfast Brigade.

== 2013 North Belfast Brigade feud ==
In 2013, it was reported in the Belfast Telegraph that the leadership of the West Belfast Brigade was once again at loggerheads with the rest of the organisation. According to the report, the West Belfast Brigade had become so associated with criminality and racketeering that the three other Belfast-based brigadiers, Jackie McDonald (South Belfast), Jimmy Birch (East Belfast) and John Bunting (North Belfast), no longer felt able to deal with the western leadership. Tensions had been further stoked by a graffiti campaign against Bunting's leadership on the York Road, in which expelled members of the North Belfast Brigade who had come under the wing of their counterparts in the west called for Bunting's removal as brigadier. The feud was confirmed in December 2013 when a UDA statement was released acknowledging the existence of a dissident tendency within the North Belfast Brigade but confirming support for Bunting's leadership. However, whilst the statement was signed by McDonald and Birch, no representative of the West Belfast Brigade had added their signature. The north Belfast rebels subsequently named Robert Molyneaux, a convicted killer and former friend of Bunting's closest ally John Howcroft, as their preferred choice for Brigadier. Although the feud soon died down, a series of low level tit-for-tat incidents continued, culminating in Howcroft's partner's car being burnt out in August 2014.

In September 2014 it was reported in the Belfast Telegraph that the leaders of the UDA in North, East and South Belfast, as well as the head of the Londonderry and North Antrim Brigade had met to discuss the feud as well as the schism with the West Belfast Brigade. According to the report, they agreed that West Belfast Brigade members loyal to the wider UDA should establish a new command structure for the brigade which would then take the lead in ousting Courtney, Spence and Eric McKee from their existing leadership positions. It was also stated that the West Belfast breakaway leaders had recruited Jimbo Simpson, a former North Belfast brigadier driven out of Northern Ireland over a decade earlier, and were seeking to restore him to his former role.

== Brigadiers ==
- Charles Harding Smith c.1971-1975
- John McClatchey 1975
- Tommy Lyttle 1975–1977
- Harry Killen 1977–1983
- Davy Payne 1983–1989
- Tommy Irvine 1990
- Ken Barrett 1990
- Billy Kennedy 1990
- Jim Spence 1990–1993
- Johnny Adair 1993–1995
- William "Winkie" Dodds 1995–2002
- Johnny Adair 2002–2003
- "Fat" Jackie Thompson 2003
- Mo Courtney 2003
- Jim Spence 2003–2006
- Matt Kincaid 2006–present

== Bibliography ==
- Lister, David and Jordan, Hugh (2004), Mad Dog: The Rise and Fall of Johnny Adair and 'C' Company, Mainstream Press
- McDonald, Henry and Cusack, Jim (2004), UDA - Inside the Heart of Loyalist Terror, Penguin Ireland
- McKay, Susan (2005), Northern Protestants - An Unsettled People, Blackstaff Press
- Wood, Ian S. (2006), Crimes of Loyalty: A History of the UDA, Edinburgh University Press
- Taylor, Peter (2000), Loyalists, Bloomsbury
