= Shoukri brothers =

Northern Irish loyalist paramilitaries

The Shoukri brothers are a pair of Northern Irish loyalist paramilitaries. Andre Khalef Shoukri was born in 1977, the son of a Coptic Christian Egyptian father and a Northern Irish mother. He was alleged to have taken over the north Belfast Ulster Defence Association (UDA) leadership. In July 2003 he received a two-year prison sentence for unlawful possession of a gun and received a nine-year sentence for various crimes in 2007. Ihab Shoukri, who was the older brother by three years, died in 2008.

== Early years ==
The brothers were natives of the Westland estate, an Ulster loyalist area of Belfast that forms an interface area with the Irish republican "Little America" area, the two places being divided by the Cavehill Road.

The brothers were educated at Lagan College, the first religiously integrated school in Northern Ireland, and at Boys' Model School, a secondary school in the north of the city.

Standing six feet tall and considered handsome on account of his exotic mixed-ethnic looks, Andre Shoukri was briefly on the books of a Templepatrick modelling agency in his youth. Both brothers, whilst still teenagers, enrolled in K Company of the UDA North Belfast Brigade, the section that covered the Westland estate. They were soon nicknamed "the Turks" and "the Pakis" on account of their swarthy appearance.

=== Killing of Gareth Parker ===
In June 1996, Andre, then 19, was charged with manslaughter after he was involved in a fight outside a north Belfast pub, in which he assaulted a Catholic tennis player, Gareth Parker, a Belfast native who had been based in Dublin. Parker later died from his injuries. Andre was acquitted of manslaughter but received a two-year sentence, after pleading guilty to unlawful and malicious wounding.

When interviewed in 2002 by The Irish News, Ihab said he had no problem killing Catholics, continuing that it had no effect on him.

== Brigadiers ==
Although members of the UDA's North Belfast Brigade, long commanded by the "Bacardi Brigadier" Jimbo Simpson, the Shoukris, like many of their contemporaries, looked instead towards Johnny Adair, head of the neighbouring UDA West Belfast Brigade, as a real leader and sought to emulate his militancy. Both were for a while imprisoned for extortion after demanding money with menace from a café owner and whilst in prison they became friendly with Adair, who was also incarcerated at the time. As the brothers' profile grew in the area, they soon assumed a leading role within their brigade and in 2002 led an internal coup to oust Simpson and install Andre Shoukri as North Belfast brigadier. The coup was undertaken with guns borrowed from Adair and ensured that, at the age of 25, Shoukri was the youngest brigadier in UDA history.

Under Shoukri's command, the North Belfast Brigade took a close involvement in clashes at sectarian interfaces during the middle of 2001 and the group was responsible for the killing of teenager Gavin Brett in Glengormley. Brett, a Protestant, had been talking with friends outside St Enda's GAC when he was shot in a drive-by shooting, his assailants assuming he was a Catholic. Brett's murder was claimed by the "Red Hand Defenders", a cover-name invented by Frankie Curry and subsequently used by both the UDA and Ulster Volunteer Force (UVF) as well as Curry's fellow dissidents. The Shoukris remained close to Adair and accompanied him and John White to the funeral of the Loyalist Volunteer Force (LVF) member Stephen Warnock in 2002, an act seen as provocative by other UDA leaders, both because they believed Adair was hoping to use the LVF to help him take full control of the UDA and also because Adair had been spreading a rumour that Jim Gray had killed Warnock rather than the Red Hand Commando, who had actually been responsible. Adair ultimately did seek to challenge the other UDA leaders although the Shoukris switched sides in late 2002 or early 2003 to support the mainstream position against Adair.

In 2003, Andre Shoukri was given a two-year prison sentence for possessing a gun. Ihab Shoukri briefly served as Brigadier following his brother's arrest although his time in command proved very short-lived after he too was arrested, along with Mo Courtney, for the murder of Alan McCullough, a former member of Johnny Adair's C Company who was killed by the UDA after returning from exile in Bolton despite having received assurances of his safety from UDA leadership.

By 2004 Andre Shoukri had returned as Brigadier, following a brief period of leadership by William Borland, and was one of the UDA leaders to meet with Secretary of State for Northern Ireland Paul Murphy in that year.

== Expulsion from UDA ==
The other five brigadiers in the UDA leadership decided to expel Andre Shoukri, his brother Ihab, and another associate in June 2006. The men's expulsion of several is believed to be a result of the organisation's stated commitment to a move away from criminal activity, and as paving the way towards decommissioning. Fears had been that there might have been another feud such as that which resulted from similar cases with both Johnny Adair and Jim Gray.

Through pressure and negotiation with the Ulster Political Research Group (UPRG), and following a meeting with political representatives from the Republic of Ireland's government and the British government, things came to a tense conclusion when it was decided by the UDA that the Shoukri brothers and their family should leave Northern Ireland.

== Andre Shoukri prison sentence ==
On 30 November 2007, Andre Shoukri was sentenced to nine years in prison at Belfast Crown Court.

He was jailed on a total of eighteen charges including the blackmail and extortion of managers of a north Belfast bar beginning in June 2004. Other charges included intimidation and acquiring and using criminal property.

He was sentenced along with four other men: William John Borland (sentenced to nine years on four counts of blackmail, one of intimidation and possession of a firearm); William John Harbinson (sentenced to seven years on three counts of blackmail, intimidation and possession of a firearm); Ian Peter Craig (who admitted to aiding and abetting a money transfer by deception and was sentenced to two years in prison suspended for three years) and Terry William Harbinson (sentenced to seven years on three counts of blackmail, intimidation and possession of a firearm). A large police presence of twenty officers was placed outside Court 12 where the case was being heard, however no disturbances occurred.

== Ihab Shoukri's death ==
On the night of 22 November 2008 a body believed by the police to be that of Ihab Shoukri was found in Newtownabbey. Police stated that the man's death was not suspicious and indicated belief that he died of a drugs overdose.

On the day of Shoukri's funeral on 27 November 2008, there were several bomb alerts including one on Ballysillan Road where the church service was to take place. They were all found to be hoaxes.

== Decommissioning ==
In February 2010 the Independent International Commission on Decommissioning announced that the 'Shoukri Paramilitary Element' had decommissioned 'some arms ammunition and explosive devices'. Arms and ammunition had also been decommissioned on two previous occasions. The group stated that the arms decommissioned were all it had under its control.

== Post-prison ==
Andre Shoukri was released from prison on 28 May 2010.

Following his release from prison he settled in Glengormley, an area of Newtownabbey covered by the UDA South East Antrim Brigade although close to his old North Belfast stronghold. He appeared in north Belfast on a number of occasions soon after his release and was stopped by police, who feared the development of a power struggle within the local UDA.

His public appearances included an event to commemorate dead loyalists in north Belfast held on Remembrance Day 2011. In 2014, John Bunting, the UDA Brigadier in north Belfast, was charged with the attempted murder of Shoukri and his associate, John "Bonzer" Boreland.

Other offices
Preceded by Jimbo Simpson	Ulster Defence Association North Belfast Brigadier (Andre Shoukri); 2002–2003	Succeeded by Ihab Shoukri
Preceded by Andre Shoukri	Ulster Defence Association North Belfast Brigadier (Ihab Shoukri); 2003	Succeeded by William Borland
Preceded by William Borland	Ulster Defence Association North Belfast Brigadier (Andre Shoukri); 2004–2006	Succeeded by John Bunting
