= Johnny Adair =

Ulster loyalist (born 1963)

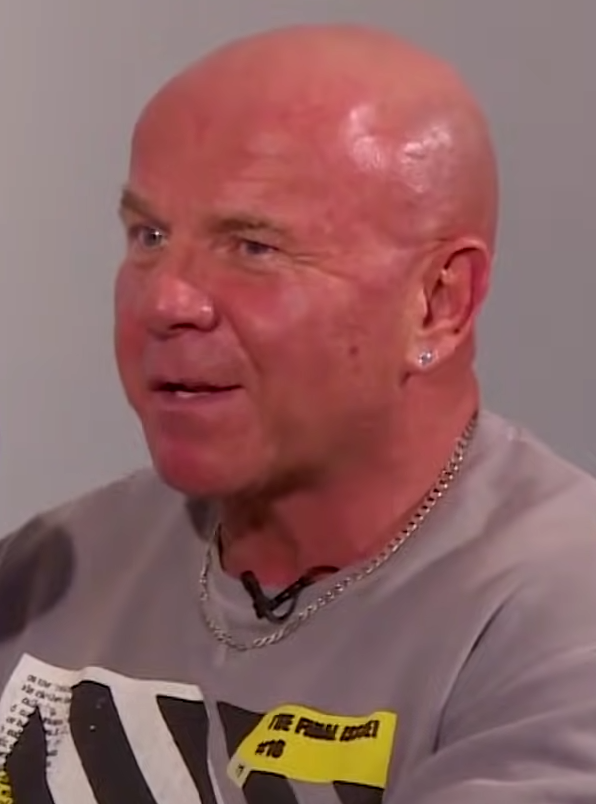
- Adair in 2019
- Born: John Adair; 27 October 1963 (age 63); Belfast, Northern Ireland
- Spouse: Gina Crossan (m. 1997; div. 2003)
- Military career
- Paramilitaries: UDA West Belfast Brigade (2002–2003); Ulster Defence Association (until 2002); Ulster Young Militants
- Rank: Brigadier
- Nickname: Mad Dog
- Units: C Company, West Belfast Brigade
- Conflicts: The Troubles; 2002-03 internal UDA feud

John Adair (born 27 October 1963), better known as Johnny Adair or Mad Dog Adair, is a Northern Irish loyalist, and the former leader of the "C Company", 2nd Battalion Shankill Road, West Belfast Brigade of the Ulster Freedom Fighters (UFF). This was a cover name used by the Ulster Defence Association (UDA), a loyalist paramilitary organisation. In 2002 Adair was expelled from the organisation following a violent internal power struggle. Since 2003, he, his family and a number of supporters have been forced to leave Northern Ireland by the mainstream UDA.

== Early life ==
Adair was born into an Ulster Protestant loyalist family and raised in Belfast. He grew up on the Old Lodge Road, a now mostly demolished road linking the lower Shankill Road to the lower Oldpark area, a site of many sectarian clashes and riots during the Troubles. The son of Jimmy and Mabel Adair, he was the youngest of their seven children, his siblings being (in age order) Margaret, Mabel, Jean, Etta, Lizzie and Archie (who was later also a UDA member).

Adair's father, Jimmy, had no involvement in loyalist activities and maintained close friendships with a number of nationalists in the New Lodge area, where he was a member of the local homing pigeon society. Jimmy continued his membership even after his son had emerged as a leading loyalist paramilitary. According to Ian S. Wood, Adair had little parental supervision and did not attend school regularly. However Hugh Jordan and David Lister insist that the Adairs were attentive and fairly strict parents who sent their children to Sunday school. As a child, Adair attended Hemsworth Primary School close to his Old Lodge Road home, where he was noted as an unremarkable student.

As he grew older Adair took to the streets, forming a skinhead street gang with a group of young loyalist friends, who "got involved initially in petty then increasingly violent crime". Members included Donald Hodgen, Sam "Skelly" McCrory, "Fat" Jackie Thompson, James and Herbie Millar. Adair, Hodgen, McCrory and Thompson were classmates at the Somerdale School on the Crumlin Road. Although the gang still officially attended school, they would frequently play truant, take a bus into the countryside and consume large quantities of cider.

The gang regularly congregated outside the Buffs Club on the corner of the Crumlin Road and Century Street, where their numbers were swollen by other young men from in and around the Shankill. Eventually, Adair started a Rock Against Communism-styled band called Offensive Weapon which openly espoused support for the National Front.

At 17, Adair began a relationship with Gina Crossan, three years his junior and also a skinhead, who at the time had shaved her head to leave only a tuft of hair at the front. The notoriety of the gang, which was part of a wider group in loyalist north and west Belfast known as the "NF Skinz" because of their support for the ideas of the National Front, gained widespread notoriety on 14 January 1981 when "Sieg Heiling" members launched a brutal attack on anti-racist fans of The Specials and The Beat when the two bands played a concert at the Ulster Hall.

This was followed in August 1983 by the so-called "Gluesniffers March", when 200 skinheads descended on Belfast City Hall determined to riot with Campaign for Nuclear Disarmament members who were holding a rally, with the march taking its name from the prevalence of solvent abuse among the skinheads. The gang was not sanctioned by the Ulster Defence Association (UDA), and led to South Belfast Brigadier John McMichael declaring that he wanted its members "run out of town". As a result, while still in his teens, Adair was threatened with knee-capping by the UDA after assaulting an old age pensioner but was given the option of joining the UDA's young wing, the Ulster Young Militants, instead. He joined the Ulster Young Militants, and later the UDA – a legal loyalist paramilitary organisation which used the cover name "Ulster Freedom Fighters" (UFF) when it carried out killings.

== Paramilitary activity ==
Upon joining the UDA in 1984, Adair and his friends were assigned to C8, an active unit that formed part of the West Belfast Brigade's C Company, which covered the lower Shankill. The young members' early duties mostly consisted of rioting, along with occasional gun attacks on heavily armoured police vehicles or arson attacks on local businesses felt to be employing "too many" Catholics. The unit was eager to become even more active and from an early stage plotted to kill a nationalist solicitor, Pat Finucane, although the plan was initially vetoed by the brigade leadership.

By the early 1990s, a new leadership had emerged on the Shankill Road following the killing of powerful South Belfast Brigadier and UDA Deputy Commander John McMichael in 1987 by a booby-trap car bomb planted by the Provisional IRA; less than three months later, Supreme Commander Andy Tyrie resigned after an attempt was made on his life. He was not replaced; instead the organisation was run by its Inner Council. With the West Belfast UDA brigadier and spokesman Tommy Lyttle in prison and gradually eased out of the leadership, Adair, as the most ambitious of the "Young Turks", established himself as head of the UDA's "C Company", 2nd Battalion based on the Shankill. Adair formed a so-called "Dream Team" of active gunmen, with many of his friends from his former skinhead gang including Sam "Skelly" McCrory, Mo Courtney, "Fat" Jackie Thompson, and Donald Hodgen recruited into the unit. In the early 1990s, Gary ‘Smickers’ Smith, who also ran a pet shop on the Shankill Road, was eventually promoted to second in command of C Company and became deputy to Adair.

=== Brigadier ===
Adair succeeded Jim Spence as brigadier in 1993 after Spence was imprisoned for extortion. When Adair became the first person in Northern Ireland charged with directing terrorism in 1995, he admitted that he had been a UDA leader for three years up to 1994. During this time, Adair and his colleagues were involved in multiple random murders of Catholic civilians, mostly carried out by a special killing unit led by Stevie "Top Gun" McKeag. At Adair's trial in 1995, the prosecuting lawyer said he was dedicated to his cause against those whom he "regarded as militant republicans – among whom he had lumped almost the entire Roman Catholic population".

Royal Ulster Constabulary (RUC) detectives believe his unit killed up to 40 people in this period. Adair once remarked to a Catholic journalist from the Republic of Ireland that normally Catholics traveled in the boot of his car. According to a press report in 2003, Adair was handed details of republican suspects by the Intelligence Corps, and was even invited for dinner with them in the early 1990s.

In his autobiography, he alleged he was frequently passed information on republican paramilitaries by sympathetic British Army members, and that his own whereabouts were passed to the IRA by the RUC Special Branch, who, he claimed, hated him. As brigadier of the West Belfast UDA, Adair was entitled to one of the six seats on the organisation's Inner Council and in this role, because he wanted to continue on the path of violence, clashed frequently with South East Antrim Brigadier Joe English, who advocated seeking a peace settlement.

The BBC described Adair as "the most controversial, high-profile and ubiquitous" of all the paramilitaries operating in Northern Ireland during this period. The IRA's Shankill Road Bombing of a fish shop in October 1993 was an attempt to assassinate Adair and the rest of the UDA's Belfast leadership in reprisal for attacks on Catholics. The office above the shop was the UDA's Shankill headquarters and a meeting was due to take place shortly after the bomb exploded. The bomb detonated prematurely, killing one of the two IRA men, Thomas Begley, and nine Protestants (a UDA volunteer and eight civilians). The UDA retaliated by carrying out the Greysteel massacre in County Londonderry, an attack on the Rising Sun bar in which eight civilians, two of whom were Protestants, were shot dead. While Adair was targeted for assassination a number of times, he frequently exaggerated the number of attempts.

=== First conviction ===
During this time, undercover officers from the RUC had recorded months of discussions with Adair in which he boasted of his activities, producing enough evidence to charge him with directing terrorism. He was convicted on 6 September 1995 and sentenced to 16 years in the Maze prison. As is standard practice in the UDA, Adair vacated his position as Brigadier upon entering prison, with his friend Winkie Dodds succeeding him.

Adair was held with other loyalist prisoners in their "block" of the prison. In prison, according to some reports, Adair sold drugs such as cannabis, ecstasy tablets and amphetamines to other loyalist prisoners, earning him an income of £5,000 a week.

In January 1998, Adair was one of five loyalist prisoners visited in the prison by British Secretary of State for Northern Ireland Mo Mowlam. She persuaded them to drop their objection to their political representatives continuing the talks that led to the Good Friday Agreement in April that year. Following the killing of Loyalist Volunteer Force (LVF) leader Billy Wright inside the Maze prison by the INLA the previous December, the UDA prisoners had voted two to one to withdraw from the peace process. Adair's co-operation was essential as he was regarded as the key figure in securing the support of the other loyalist prisoners.

At the end of April 1999, while he was on home leave from prison, Adair was shot at and grazed by a bullet in the head at a UB40 concert in Belfast which he had attended with his wife. Adair blamed the shooting on Republicans, but it is not known who was responsible. In September 1999, Adair was released as part of the early-release scheme for paramilitary prisoners under the Belfast Agreement.

== Loyalist feuds ==
=== 2000 ===
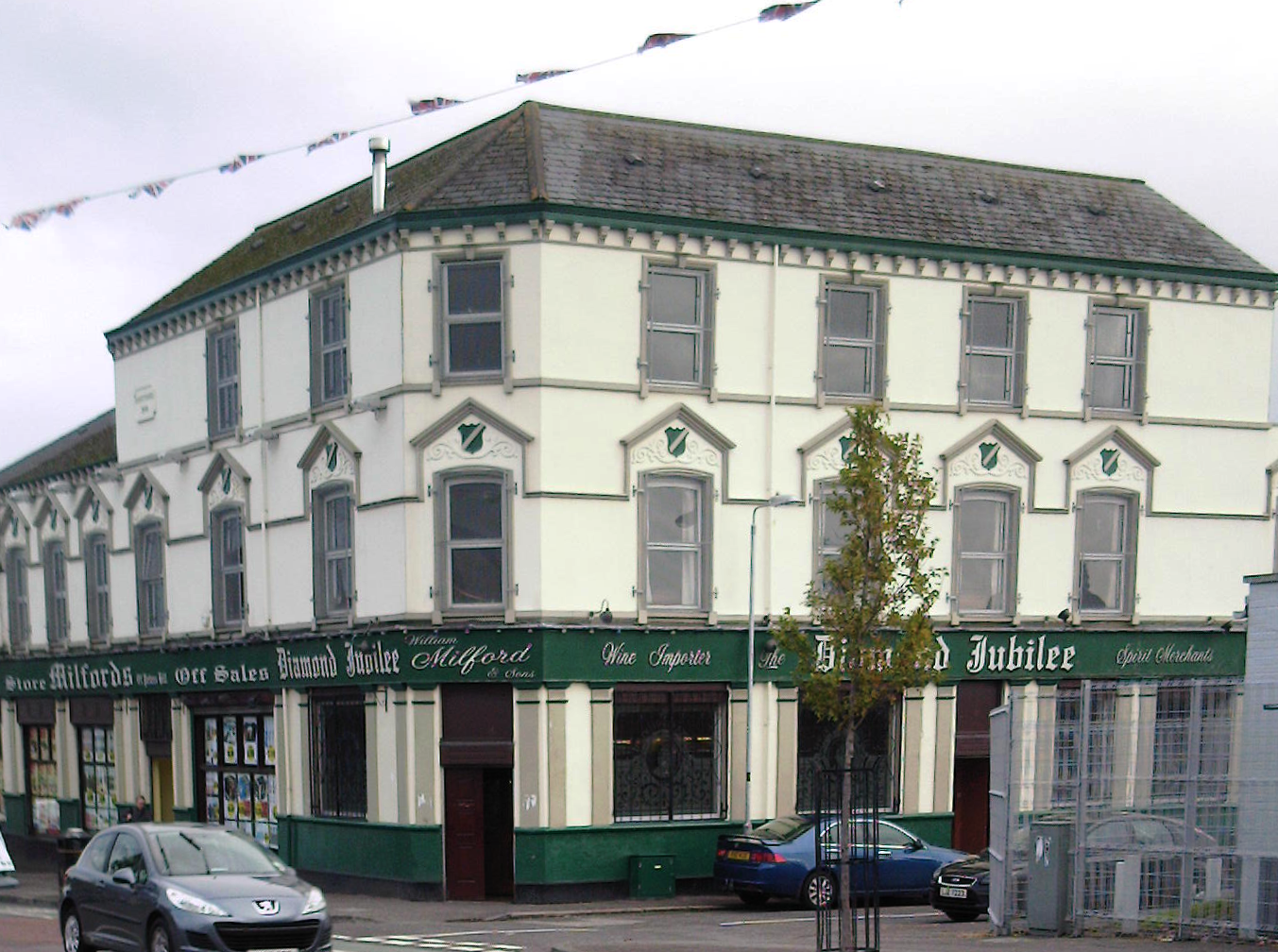
The "Diamond Jubilee" pub on the lower Shankill Road was the favourite meeting place for Adair and his C Company

After his release, most of Adair's activities were bound up with violent internecine feuds within the UDA and between the UDA and other loyalist paramilitary groups. The motivation for such violence is sometimes difficult to piece together; it usually involves a combination of political differences over the ceasefires, rivalry over control of territory, and competition over the proceeds of organised crime.

In August 2000 Adair claimed he had been attacked with a pipe bomb by the IRA. That same month, on 19 August, he organised a "loyalist day of culture" on the lower Shankill Road. He invited the five other brigadiers from the Inner Council to attend, along with loyalist Michael Stone and politicians John White and Frank McCoubrey.

This event featured loyalist marching bands and a militant show of strength by the West Belfast Brigade. It also marked the start of a violent feud between the UDA and its main rival, the Ulster Volunteer Force (UVF). Clashes first broke outside the Diamond Jubilee on the Lower Shankill, then spread to the Rex Bar, a popular UVF drinking den where shots were fired and UVF members beaten up. Adair and his followers then attacked the homes of UVF members and their families in the Lower Shankill, forcing them out of the area, while orders were also sent to A Company in Highfield that the estate should be "cleansed" of UVF members.

Adair's men also sacked the homes of Gusty Spence and Winston Churchill Rea as part of a move to drive the UVF off the Shankill. The UVF struck back on 21 August, killing two of Adair's allies, Jackie Coulter and Bobby Mahood, on the Crumlin Road. In response, C Company members burned down the headquarters of the UVF-linked Progressive Unionist Party (PUP). Adair was arrested on 22 August 2000 whilst he and Dodds were driving down the Shankill Road. As a result of his involvement in the violence, Secretary of State for Northern Ireland Peter Mandelson revoked Adair's early release and returned him to prison. This time he was sent to Maghaberry instead of the Maze. With command reverting to Dodds, UVF member Samuel Rockett was killed by C Company the following night. The UVF struck back and 4 more people on both sides were killed before the feud then petered out.

=== 2002 ===
On 15 May 2002, Adair was released from prison again. Outside the prison he was greeted by up to 300 of his supporters. Once free, he was a key part of an effort to forge stronger ties between the UDA and the LVF, a small breakaway faction of the UVF founded in 1996 by Billy Wright and following his killing, commanded by Mark "Swinger" Fulton, with whom Adair was on good terms. Fulton had been in Maghaberry since December 2001. The most open declaration of this alliance was a joint mural depicting Adair's UDA "C company" and the LVF. Other elements in the UDA strongly resisted these movements, which they saw as an attempt by Adair to win external support in a bid to take over the leadership of the UDA. Some UDA members disliked his overt association with the drugs trade, which the LVF were even more heavily involved with. For his part Adair controlled a block of flats in his Lower Shankill stronghold from which he and his allies dealt drugs.

Adair also sought to work closely with Belfast-based dissidents such as Frankie Curry and Jackie Mahood, provoking further anger from the UVF. Another loyalist feud erupted, and ended with several men dead and scores evicted from their homes. The Rathcoole home of long-standing UDA member Sammy Duddy was raked by gunfire; although Duddy was not injured in the shooting attack, his pet chihuahua Bambi was fatally wounded by shots fired through the front door by masked gunmen from Adair's C Company. Adair later admitted in an interview he gave for journalist Suzanne Breen that Duddy never got over the loss of Bambi.

On 13 September 2002, Jim Gray – the head of the UDA in East Belfast and an archrival of Adair – was shot in the face by Adair's supporters. The shooting was described by the police as "loosely related" to the death of Stephen Warnock, an LVF leader, as part of a loyalist feud.

Adair had been spreading rumours that Gray and John Gregg, head of the UDA South East Antrim Brigade, were both to be stood down as part of his attempts to take full control of the UDA. As part of this campaign Adair had visited Warnock's family and told them that Gray had been involved in their relative's death, even though he was aware that it had actually been carried out by a hired Red Hand Commando (RHC) gunman after Warnock refused to pay a drug debt to a North Down businessman. As a result, Gray was shot by a lone gunman after he left the Warnock home, where he had been paying his respects to the deceased.

==== Expulsion from the UDA ====
On 20 September 2002, Adair was summoned to an Inner Council meeting held in Sandy Row where there was a showdown between him and the other brigadiers, including Gray. Fearing an ambush, Adair had his allies "Fat" Jackie Thompson and James "Sham" Millar smuggle a pistol for him to the meeting. Five days later, Adair was expelled from the UDA for treason along with close associate John White. Adair's response to the expulsion was "Fuck them uns" and declared the West Belfast Brigade a separate organisation from the mainstream UDA. He even erected "West Belfast UDA – Business as Usual" banners on the Shankill Road. By this point Adair had even lost the support of the Shoukri brothers, his proteges in north Belfast who had been amongst his closest allies outside of his own area but who decided to side with the mainstream UDA in this dispute. There were attempts on Adair's and White's lives.

Adair returned to prison in January 2003, when his early release licence was revoked by Secretary of State for Northern Ireland Paul Murphy on grounds of engaging in unlawful activity. He appointed "Fat" Jackie Thompson as his replacement as Brigadier. On 1 February 2003, UDA divisional leader John Gregg was shot dead along with another UDA member, Robert "Rab" Carson, on returning from a Rangers FC match in Glasgow. The killing was widely blamed on Adair's C Company – Gregg was one of those who had organised the expulsion of Adair from the UDA. Among the mainstream UDA, a powerful faction of Adair opponents quickly formed under the leadership of South Belfast brigadier Jackie McDonald. In the early hours of 6 February (five days after Gregg's shooting and just hours before his funeral was due to take place), about twenty Adair supporters, including White and Adair's wife, fled their homes for Scotland after 100 heavily armed men from the mainstream UDA invaded Adair's stronghold, forcing them to quit Northern Ireland.

== Exile from Northern Ireland and personal life ==
Following the ousting of C Company from the Shankill Road, Adair's family and supporters went to Bolton where they garnered the nickname 'Bolton Wanderers' after the football club of the same name. Following the killing of LVF leader Billy Wright in 1997 Adair became the new contact man for a group of Bolton-based members of the neo-Nazi organisation Combat 18 (C18) who up to that point had been close to the LVF. Adair built up a close relationship with these far right activists, even wearing an England shirt during UEFA Euro 2000 that one of the members had given him. Furthermore, when the feud with the UVF was launched in 2000 through C Company members attacking the UVF's Rex Bar stronghold a few C18 members fought alongside the UDA men. As a result, it was to the homes of these far rightists, in particular a Bolton-based tattoo artist and C18 member, that Adair's supporters fled in 2003.

Adair was released from prison on 10 January 2005 and immediately headed to Bolton after being taken by helicopter to nearby Manchester. The police in Bolton questioned his wife, Gina about her involvement in the drugs trade, and his son, Jonathan Jr (nicknamed both 'Mad Pup' and 'Daft Dog') has been charged with selling crack cocaine and heroin. Adair himself was arrested and fined for assault and threatening behaviour in September 2005. He had married Gina Crossan, his partner for many years, at the Maze prison on 21 February 1997. Together they had three children.

Several claims have been made about Adair's sexuality by his former girlfriend, Jackie "Legs" Robinson, and UDA hitman Michael Stone. Stone claimed in his autobiography that Adair had sex with other male inmates while in prison. Jackie Robinson, who beginning in 1991 sustained a nine-year off-and-on relationship with Adair, backed up this claim in an interview with The Mirror, in which she alleged that Adair has been having sex with long-term friend and fellow loyalist Skelly McCrory since they were teenagers.

Robinson told The Mirror journalist that she and Adair had sexual encounters during her visits to him in prison and that he received visits from prostitutes as well. In her book, In Love With a Mad Dog, Robinson stated that after a UDA killing had been carried out, he would become highly aroused and afterwards be "particularly wild in bed". It was also alleged that the mere discussion of the details of operations he had helped plan gave him a "sexually charged excitement", even when the killings had been done by others.

After his release, he was almost immediately re-arrested for violently assaulting his wife Gina, who had been diagnosed with and treated for ovarian cancer. After this episode Adair reportedly moved to Scotland but later relocated to Horwich, near Bolton in early 2003. In 2003 he became a grandfather for the first time.

In May 2006, it was reported that Adair had received £100,000 from John Blake Publishing for a ghost-written autobiography. In November 2006, the UK's Five television channel transmitted an observational documentary on Adair made by Donal MacIntyre. The focus of the film centred around Adair and another supposedly reformed character, a former neo-Nazi from Germany known as Nick Greger, and their trip to Uganda to build an orphanage. Adair was seen firing rifles, stating it was the first time he had done so without wearing gloves. In November 2008, Adair appeared in an episode of Danny Dyer's Deadliest Men which profiled fellow C Company inmate Sam "Skelly" McCrory.

On 20 July 2015 three Irish republicans (Antoin Duffy, Martin Hughes and Paul Sands) were found guilty of planning to murder Adair and Sam McCrory. Charges against one of the accused in the trial were dropped on 1 July.

On 10 September 2016, Johnny and Gina Adair's son, Jonathan Jr, was found dead in Troon, aged 32. Adair Jr died from an accidental overdose while celebrating the day after his release from prison for motoring offences. Adair Jr had been in and out of prison since the family fled Northern Ireland. He served a five-year sentence for dealing heroin and crack cocaine. The year before Jonathan had been cleared of a gun raid at a party and in 2012 was the target of a failed bomb plot. He was also facing trial later that year on drugs charges.

In December 2023, while recording a podcast with far-right activist Tommy Robinson, Adair surprisingly expressed a grudging respect for the IRA hunger strikers, describing the manner of their deaths as "dedication at the highest level" for a political cause and admitting that he would not have volunteered to do the same if asked.

== Bibliography ==
- Lister, David and Jordan, Hugh. (2005). Mad Dog: The Rise and Fall of Johnny Adair and 'C Company'. Mainstream Publishing; ISBN 978-1-84018-890-5
- McDonald, Henry & Cusack, Jim (2004). UDA – Inside the Heart of Loyalist Terror. Dublin: Penguin Ireland.

Other offices
Preceded by Jim Spence	Ulster Defence Association West Belfast Brigadier; 1993–1995	Succeeded by William "Winkie" Dodds
Preceded by William "Winkie" Dodds	Ulster Defence Association West Belfast Brigadier; 1999–2000	Succeeded by William "Winkie" Dodds
Preceded by William "Winkie" Dodds	Ulster Defence Association West Belfast Brigadier; 2002	Succeeded by Mo Courtney
