= Rosena Brown =

Irish actress and Provisional IRA intelligence officer

- Born: c. 1945; Belfast, Northern Ireland
- Occupation: Actress
- Known for: Provisional IRA Intelligence Officer

Rosena Brown (Irish: Róisín De Brún; born c.1945) is an Irish actress of television, cinema, and stage from Belfast, Northern Ireland who also served as an intelligence officer for the Provisional IRA. Dubbed the "IRA Mata Hari", she was named in the murder trial of prison officer John Hanna, who was charged and convicted of helping the IRA kill colleague Brian Armour. She allegedly persuaded Hanna into providing information on Armour which she then passed on to the IRA; however, she was not charged with complicity in Armour's murder. In 1992, she and two men were arrested when a booby-trap bomb was found in their car. In 1993, she was sentenced to 20 years' imprisonment, but was released in December 1998 under the terms of the Good Friday Agreement.

A grandmother of nine, Brown continued to work in local community theatre following her release. She was portrayed by actress Rose McGowan in the 2008 crime thriller film Fifty Dead Men Walking.

== Early life and career ==
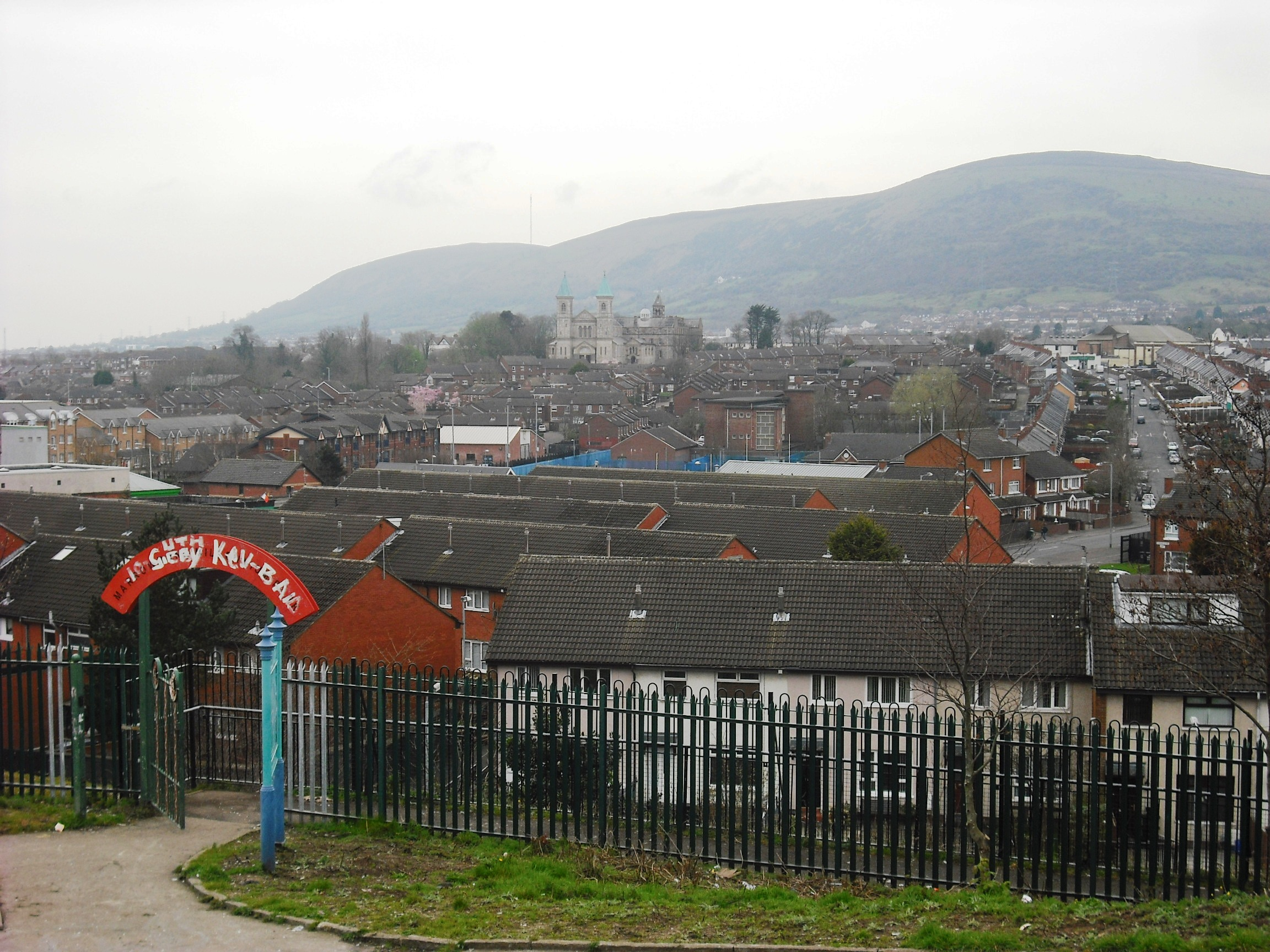
A view of the nationalist Ardoyne area of north Belfast where Brown spent the early years of her life

Brown was born in about 1945 in Belfast, Northern Ireland. She was brought up in the Irish nationalist Ardoyne area and raised in the Catholic religion. She later moved to west Belfast. When her marriage broke up, her husband left her with seven children to raise on her own. At one time she worked in a shirt factory alongside Protestants, which was relatively unusual in Belfast where Catholics and Protestants were typically segregated in the workplace as well as living in their own neighbourhoods and attending separate schools.

Described as slim, blonde, immaculately groomed and petite, Brown landed a small part in the 1983 film Acceptable Levels, which was shot on location in Belfast. It has a Troubles-related theme. She then joined the Charabanc Theatre Company which toured Britain, Europe, the US, and Canada. She had minor roles in Ken Loach's Hidden Agenda and Richard Attenborough's Closing the Ring, and she played alongside Sinéad O'Connor in Hush-a-Bye-Baby. She also had a role in the 2004 Irish comedy Man About Dog in which she played the mother of one of the film's main characters, Mo Chara. Prior to her imprisonment, she starred in the Northern Ireland Office Crack Crime campaign. She has done much work in local community theatre since her release from prison.

== IRA Intelligence Officer ==
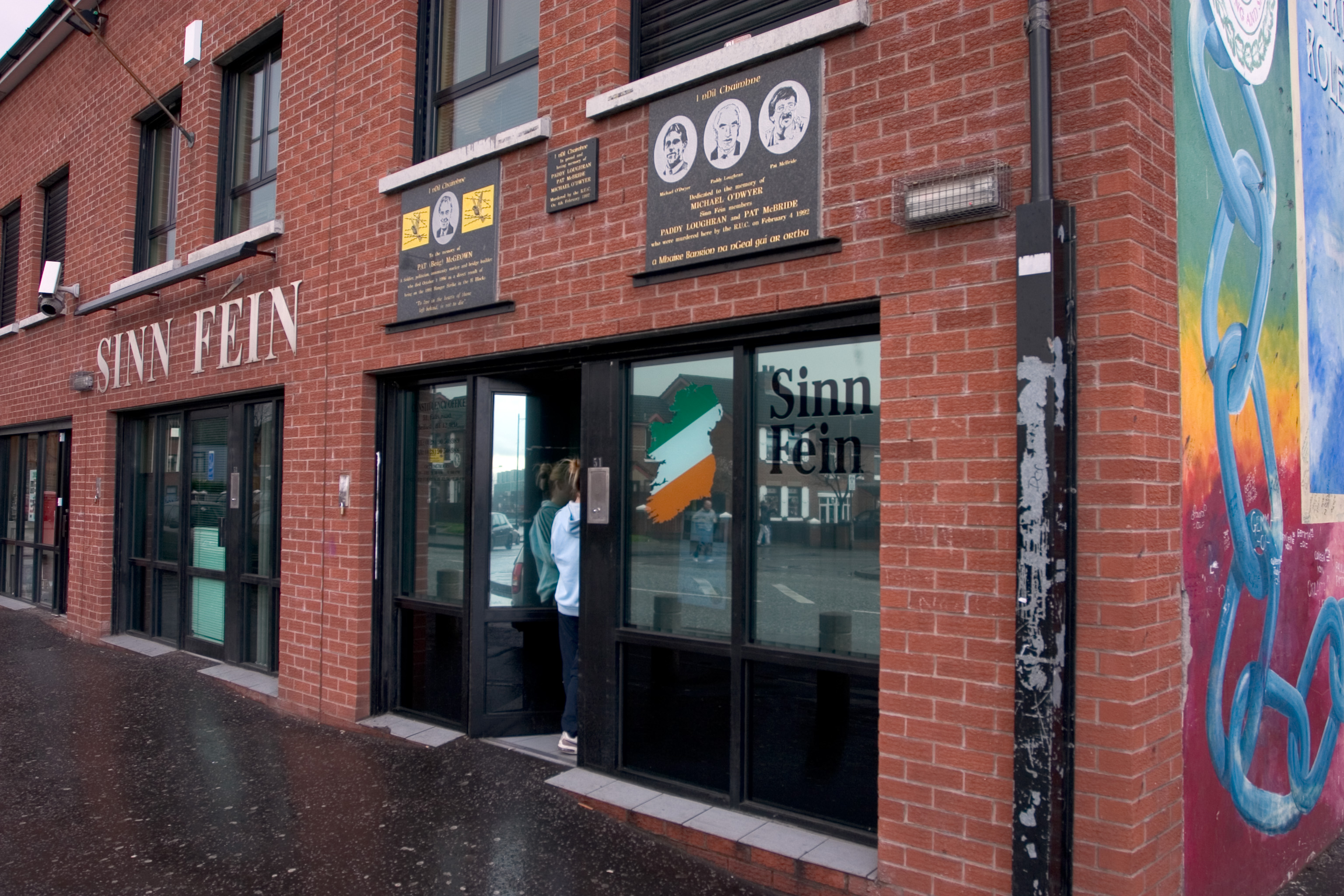
The Sinn Féin offices in Belfast. Brown was a former worker for Sinn Féin

She joined the Irish republican movement in 1970 as a worker for Sinn Féin, the political wing of the IRA. It is not known exactly when she joined the Provisional IRA, but in 1971 she was forced to go on the run and spent six years hiding in Dublin. After returning to Northern Ireland, she was arrested in 1978 for IRA activity and sent to Armagh Women's Prison for a brief period.

Sometime after her release from Armagh she became an IRA intelligence officer, and later received the nickname of the "IRA Mata Hari" by the media. She was described by journalist Mark Devenport as having been especially suited for intelligence work; in particular she was highly skilled at losing herself when members of the security forces were tailing her. She often used the Irish version of her name, Róisín De Brún. According to journalist Liam Clarke, Brown used a mixture of "blackmail, political argument and seduction" to inveigle John Hanna, a senior officer at the Maze Prison, into providing her with information on top loyalists and prison officer colleagues, which she then passed on to the IRA. This form of espionage is known as a "honey trap". The Belfast Telegraph newspaper described Brown as "one of the most famous 'honeys'". When she was with Hanna she used the name "Ann Brown". Ulster Defence Association (UDA) leader Andy Tyrie suggested that Hanna gave Brown information regarding the movements of UDA South Belfast brigadier John McMichael which she then passed on to the IRA who subsequently assassinated him. Hanna, who was completely infatuated with Brown and later admitted that he was dominated by "a Provie woman", obtained the information regarding McMichael during the latter's visits to loyalist inmates inside the Maze. Brown was personally introduced to McMichael at his pub the "Admiral Benbow" which he owned in his native Lisburn. She warned him that he was "being watched". John McMichael was killed on 22 December 1987 when a booby-trap bomb exploded underneath his car in his driveway. The IRA unit which planted the bomb was led by Seán Savage, who would later be gunned down by the SAS in Gibraltar in what became known as Operation Flavius. Neither Hanna nor Brown were ever charged with involvement in McMichael's murder. It is widely believed that he was set up by his UDA associates. Royal Ulster Constabulary (RUC) Chief Constable Sir John Hermon also suggested that this was the case. Racketeer and UDA "fundraiser" James Craig was shot dead inside an east Belfast pub by the Ulster Freedom Fighters (UFF) for allegedly setting up McMichael's assassination by the IRA.

Brown's importance to the IRA as an intelligence officer is revealed by Martin McGartland in his memoirs. McGartland, an RUC Special Branch agent who infiltrated the IRA, alleged that he was ordered by both his IRA commander and his handlers to work with Brown. He characterised her as having been "very well-spoken and pleasant to deal with", but firmly denied that they had had a love affair. He stated that in early 1990, she took a package wrapped in clingfilm out of her mouth and told him to deliver it to another IRA intelligence officer, Davy Adams (nephew of Sinn Féin president Gerry Adams). Inside the package was a list containing the names, addresses, postcodes, and car registration numbers of RUC officers, which had been copied from a police database. McCartland's handlers suggested that the highly detailed information had come from an RUC officer with whom Brown had formed a liaison.

In that same year, 1990, Hanna was sentenced to life imprisonment for aiding and abetting the IRA in the murder of his colleague, Brian Samuel Armour, vice-chairman of the Prison Officers' Association. Armour was killed by a booby-trap bomb on 4 October 1988 as he drove through Bloomfield in Belfast. Hanna allegedly provided Brown with Armour's address which enabled the IRA to plant the bomb underneath his car. Brown was named at Hanna's trial as the conduit through which the information on Armour was passed by Hanna to the IRA. She was taken in by the RUC for interrogation regarding the Armour killing whilst she was shooting Hush-a-Bye-Baby, a feature film for Channel Four. Rod Stoneman, Commissioning Editor at Channel Four, phoned the RUC protesting that her arrest was holding up production. A RUC Special Branch policeman reportedly replied, "Well, it may not have occurred to you, but we are fighting a war here". She wasn't charged in connection with Armour's killing and subsequently released from police custody. Although it was believed by the RUC and media that Brown had sex with Hanna in order to obtain the information she needed, both she and Hanna adamantly maintained that during their encounters they never had a "full sexual relationship". According to McGartland, she and Hanna often met in lay-bys or the cemetery where his parents were buried.

After the details of her involvement with Hanna became known to the public, Brown ensconced herself in staunch republican areas of north and west Belfast. According to Devenport, she became romantically involved with IRA associate Davy Adams during this period.

=== Arrest and imprisonment ===
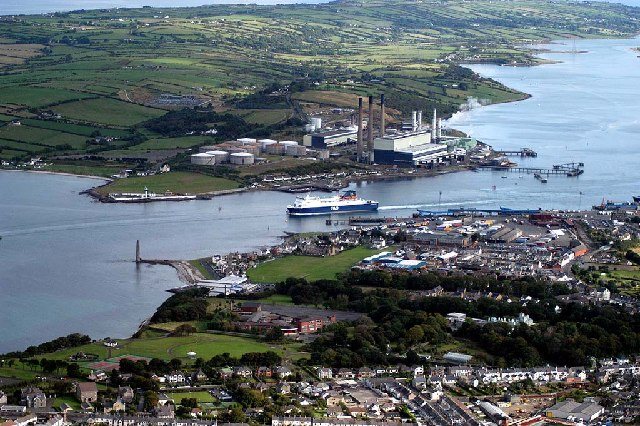
The seaport of Larne, County Antrim where Brown was arrested by the RUC in 1992

In early 1992, Brown was arrested in the seaport of Larne along with IRA volunteers Paul McCullough and Steven Canning, when a booby-trap bomb was discovered in the glove box of their car. She had been driving the car towards the town when RUC officers stopped the vehicle, ordered her to pull over and all three occupants out onto a verge. As she took off her woollen cap, the ginger wig she had been wearing as a disguise slipped off, therefore revealing her identity. The RUC then found the bomb inside the car. On 10 September 1993, she was sentenced to 20 years' imprisonment at Mourne House, the women's unit of HM Maghaberry for illegal possession of explosives and conspiracy to murder members of the security forces.

The arrest of Brown led to some recriminations within loyalist circles. The April 1992 edition of UDA official journal New Ulster Defender not only highlighted the case of Brown but also claimed that her activity was standard practice within republicanism, claiming:

It would appear she is one of a number of very evil women who play an integral part in the republican war machine. And recent information would suggest that these evil persons are frequenting drinking establishments in loyalist towns and along the Golden Mile in Belfast, to try and tempt off-duty Security Force members and loyalist paramilitaries back to their lair to receive a coup de grace. So loyalists beware when you are drinking in town or you could end up on your backs for all the wrong reasons.

Whilst in prison, she studied music, art and law. She completed two years of an Art degree from Open University.

She was released in mid-December 1998 under the terms of the Good Friday Agreement.

== Later years ==
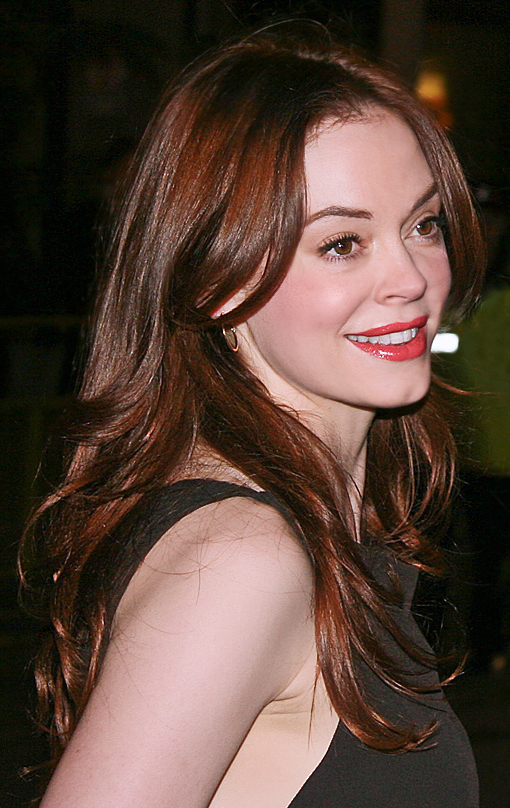
Actress Rose McGowan portrayed Brown in the 2008 crime thriller film Fifty Dead Men Walking

Soon after her release from Maghaberry, she performed in the west Belfast theatrical production of the play, A Mother's Heart with other former IRA women prisoners. It is a monologue about four mothers who have each lost children. In a February 1999 interview with the Sinn Féin's official newspaper, An Phoblacht she offered the following comments regarding the play,

It [the play] also brings real humanity to the grief of loss; they are not just names on the news, where you read about deaths but then get distracted, this play really hits home.

She has since continued to work with the west Belfast theatre group. She has retained some links to republicanism and was shown in attendance at a Bobby Sands memorial event in 2009 as well as performing at Sinn Féin celebration for International Women's Day in 2010. She has also worked for Coiste na nIarchimi, an organisation for former republican prisoners in which they are employed as tour guides around the Falls Road and other republican areas.

Through her seven children, Brown has nine grandchildren.

Brown was portrayed by actress Rose McGowan in the 2008 crime thriller film Fifty Dead Men Walking which is based on IRA infiltrator Martin McGartland.

According to author Ian S. Wood, Brown refuses to talk about her past as an IRA member. During an interview, she promised journalist Mark Devenport that he would be able to tell her life story, "but that won't be until the war's over".

== Filmography ==
- Acceptable Levels (film, 1983)
- Reefer and the Model (film, 1989) – "The Blonde"
- Hidden Agenda (film, 1990)
- Hush-a-Bye Baby (film, 1990) – "Mrs. Friel"
- Man About Dog (film, 2004) – "Mo Chara's Ma"
- Pulling Moves: Catch the Pidgeon (TV series, 2004) – "Mrs. Reilly"
- Closing the Ring (film, 2007) – "Shelterer From the Air Raid"
- Marù: Daphne Taylor (TV series, 2007) – "Attack Victim"

== Theatre ==
- Now You're Talkin (1985) – "Madeleine"
- Gold in the Streets (1986) – various characters
- The Girls in the Big Picture (1986) – "Esther Moore" and "Patsy Flood"
- A Mother's Heart (1999) – "Marjorie"
