= William McCullough (loyalist) =

Loyalist paramilitary from Northern Ireland

- Born: 1949; Shankill Road, Belfast, Northern Ireland
- Died: 16 October 1981 (aged 32); Denmark Street, Belfast, Northern Ireland
- Other names: "Bucky", Billy
- Military career
- Allegiance: United Kingdom
- Paramilitary: Ulster Defence Association
- Service years: 1971 – 1981
- Rank: Lieutenant-Colonel
- Unit: West Belfast Brigade
- Conflicts: The Troubles

William McCullough (1949 – 16 October 1981) was a Northern Irish loyalist paramilitary with the Ulster Defence Association (UDA). McCullough was a leading member of the UDA's West Belfast Brigade, holding the rank of Lieutenant-Colonel, until 1981 when he was killed by the republican Irish National Liberation Army (INLA).

== UDA activity ==
A native of the Shankill Road area of Belfast, McCullough joined the UDA at its inception in 1971. Within the UDA he garnered an early reputation as a ruthless gunman and was frequently questioned by the Royal Ulster Constabulary (RUC) over his involvement in killings and bomb attacks, albeit without being charged. One of the most notorious incidents that he was held responsible for was a grenade attack on the Gem Bar in the Catholic New Lodge area. He was a close ally of Charles Harding Smith and supported him during the brief period that Smith took the West Belfast brigade out of the mainstream UDA. McCullough was married to Barbara with whom he had six children, the youngest of which, Alan, would also become a leading member of the West Belfast UDA. The couple also had four daughters and another son Kenny.

McCullough was a leading figure within the West Belfast Brigade and was part of the Inner Circle of the brigade, which contained those who were close to Brigadier Tommy Lyttle. McCullough was particularly close to James Craig who was in charge of fundraising for the Brigade and who also maintained a series of shadowy links to some republican figures. In the mid-1970s McCullough was one of four UDA members to accompany Craig to a meeting with five leading members of the Official Irish Republican Army (OIRA) at the Royal Bar, Ann Street in Belfast city centre at which they concluded a series of agreements not to target each other's members and not to get in the way of each other's rackets. All of the republicans present, with whom Craig remained in contact, switched allegiance to the Irish National Liberation Army (INLA) soon after the meeting.

=== Clash with Craig ===
Like Craig, who was notorious for his gangsterism, McCullough was involved in racketeering on behalf of the UDA although the money he secured from his rackets was passed on to the UDA's military wing the "Ulster Freedom Fighters" (UFF) to purchase weapons. This was often not the case with Craig, who enriched himself personally through the rackets he ran. According to Martin Dillon McCullough discovered that Craig was enriching himself through a number of extortion rackets, the proceeds of which were supposed to go to the upkeep of the UDA in West Belfast. When McCullough began to raise his suspicions Craig decided to set him up to silence him. McCullough further heard that money set aside for loyalist prisoners had been taken by Craig and when Craig was briefly in custody on extortion charges McCullough publicly spoke of telling UFF commander John McMichael about Craig's activity.

== Death ==
Upon being informed of McCullough's accusations and his demands for an internal inquiry into the finances of the West Belfast Brigade, Craig decided to have McCullough killed. He discounted having the popular Lieutenant-Colonel killed by a UDA member and instead made contact with his friends in the INLA, telling them that McCullough was a leading figure in UFF sectarian killings. McCullough was shot and killed at his home on Denmark Street on the lower Shankill on 16 October 1981. Preparing to drive one of his daughters to school, a motorcycle drove up and the pillion passenger opened fire as McCullough was getting into his car. He was shot twelve times and despite medical attention died a few minutes later. His youngest son Alan was three months old at the time of McCullough's death. McCullough was living only a few doors away from West Belfast Brigadier Tommy Lyttle at the time. Robbie McAllister, an INLA "supergrass", would later claim that Lyttle had been the actual target that day, although in fact the INLA had been tracking McCullough's movements for some time using Craig's information.

According to McAllister's testimony they had watched McCullough through binoculars from the flat of Emmanuel Conway, who lived in the republican Unity Flats area adjacent to the lower Shankill. Ironically enough Conway had been one of the OIRA members to attend the Royal Bar meeting before switching to the INLA. McAllister then claimed that he rode on a motorcycle from the Unity Flats with another INLA member, a fellow Markets man identified only as "Bronco", riding pillion and that when they reached Denmark Street Bronco dismounted and fired several shots into McCullough's car. The pair then rode off as far as the area close to Divis Flats at the bottom of the Falls Road where the motorcycle broke down. McAllister added that he only learned McCullough's name on the radio due to Lyttle being the target. In November 1985 McAllister was sentenced to a total of 766 years in prison for his role in several killings, including that of McCullough.

=== Aftermath ===
Craig himself was eventually killed by the Ulster Freedom Fighters in 1988 in an attack that was publicly blamed on his role in setting up the murder of UDA South Belfast Brigadier and UFF commander John McMichael. Privately however it was held that Craig had played a similar role in the killing of McCullough, as well as Ulster Volunteer Force (UVF) leaders Lenny Murphy, John Bingham and William Marchant. Tommy McCreery, a relative of East Belfast Brigadier Ned McCreery and a former associate of Craig and McCullough who was also at the Royal Bar meeting, told an internal UDA inquiry held after Craig's death that Craig had set up McCullough with the INLA and that he had informed Andy Tyrie shortly before Craig was killed.

McCullough's death would see him feted as a loyalist hero. At a time when the West Belfast Brigade was stagnating there was no direct retaliation attack. A young member, Gary Smyth, suggested driving up the republican Falls Road and opening fire on people waiting at a bus stop but his superiors vetoed the idea, leading to Smyth leaving the UDA. McCullough was given a full UDA funeral and was buried with a scarf and rosette of Liverpool F.C., of whom he was a supporter. McCullough is commemorated on a mural close to his home on Denmark Street. A UDA statement in 2003, released after the killing of Alan McCullough by UDA members, stated that "Bucky McCullough is a loyalist icon and very much revered within the loyalist community".
