= Phoenix23 =

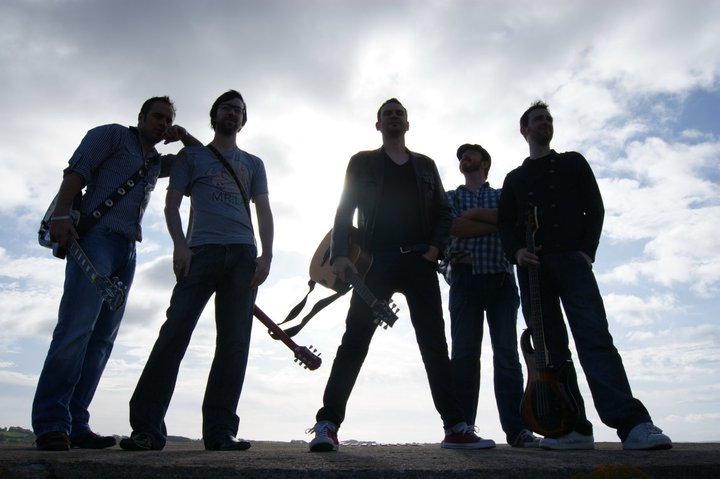
- Phoenix 23

Background information
- Origin: Northern Ireland
- Genres: Rock and roll, pop rock
- Years active: 2007–present
- Members: Gav Campbell; Andy Cochrane; Glenn Donnelly; Neil Donnelly
- Website: Official website

Phoenix 23 are a three piece band from Northern Ireland. Formed in 2007, they consist of three cousins, Gav Campbell, Neil Donnelly & Glenn Donnelly. They had had multiple guest players in their band throughout the years (cousin Andy Cochrane, Deano, Steve Hodge, Mark Matthewson, John Kearns and Paul Kennedy) but the core of the 3 main members keeps the band going strong!

They had three songs in the soundtrack for the Ben Kingsley film Fifty Dead Men Walking, directed by Kari Skogland; two songs which were written solely for the film; "Hit the Ground Running" (featured in Empire magazine), and "It’s a Blast", along with "Hurricane".

Their debut album was produced by Supertramp’s guitarist Carl Verheyen, who also guests on lead guitar. It featured drummer/percussionist Steve DiStanislao and was produced by Bernard Matthews.

In 2010, they had airplay on Cool FM in Northern Ireland, along with having reviews in Ireland, England, Italy and California.

== Gav Campbell ==
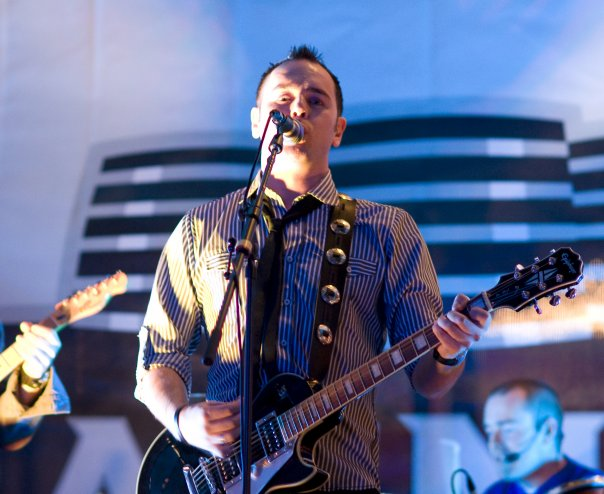

Gav Campbell is the lead singer and songwriter for the band. He can play both drums and guitar, but is currently also a guitarist in the band. He has been a DJ on Cool FM, a station covering the Greater Belfast area, he now works behind the scenes. His sister Tina Campbell is a presenter on BBC.
