= Martin McGartland =

Informer for the British in the IRA (born 1970)

- Born: 30 January 1970 (age 56); Belfast, Northern Ireland
- Occupations: Police agent, author
- Known for: Successful infiltration of the Provisional IRA

Martin McGartland (born 30 January 1970) is a former British informer who infiltrated the Provisional Irish Republican Army (IRA) in 1989 to pass information to RUC Special Branch.

When he was exposed as an informer in 1991 he was abducted by the IRA, but escaped and was resettled in England. His identity became publicly known after a minor court case. He was later shot six times by a gunman, but recovered from the injuries. He has written two books about his life, Fifty Dead Men Walking: The Terrifying True Story of a Secret Agent Inside the IRA and Dead Man Running.

== Early life ==
Born into a staunchly Irish republican, Roman Catholic family in Belfast, McGartland grew up in a council house in Moyard, Ballymurphy at the foot of the Black Mountain. His parents were separated and he had one brother, Joe, and two sisters, Elizabeth and Catherine. As the Troubles escalated, republican areas such as Ballymurphy increasingly came under the control of the local Provisional IRA (IRA) who, in the absence of normal policing, took on some policing functions. Their methods were not met with approval by all residents. One of the effects of the continuous rioting and the campaign of bombings and shootings in Belfast and all over Northern Ireland was to make McGartland grow up quickly.

McGartland described his childhood in West Belfast as one in which he would join with older boys in stone-throwing to goad the British Army. He also would join in with other Catholic youths to battle against Ulster Protestant boys from nearby loyalist estates; this mostly involved throwing stones at each other. His sister Catherine was one of many children who joined the youth movement of the IRA. She was later killed after accidentally falling through a skylight at her school. He attended Vere Foster Primary School, a controlled school located in Moyard, Ballymurphy. The school closed in 2011. McGartland later attended St Thomas' Secondary School. He befriended a homeless man who sheltered in the disused Old Broadway cinema on the Falls Road, and provided the man with food and money. McGartland's first job was working a paper round, and later delivering milk.

== Special Branch agent ==
McGartland became involved in petty crime, which brought him to the notice of the Royal Ulster Constabulary (RUC). His activities also attracted the attention of the IRA and on several occasions he narrowly escaped local disciplinary squads. Since the beginning of the Troubles, many Irish nationalists reported offences to Sinn Féin, a political party associated with the IRA, rather than the RUC. This effectively made the IRA a police force in some areas.

McGartland has said that because he was sickened by increasing Provisional IRA violence directed at young Catholic petty lawbreakers in the form of punishment beatings (often carried out with iron bars and baseball bats) and knee-cappings, in 1986 at the age of 16 he agreed to provide information to the RUC about local IRA members, thereby preventing them from carrying out many attacks against the security forces.

At the same time, the IRA employed him as a security officer in a protection racket; his job was to guard a building site in Ballymurphy which was under the protection of the IRA. He then worked for a local taxi firm as an unlicensed driver, paying a percentage to the IRA. This enabled him to better identify suspects who had been targeted by RUC Special Branch. He recounted in his book Fifty Dead Men Walking that he occasionally drove IRA punishment squads around and overheard them boast about the beatings they had meted out to their victims. McGartland asserts many were innocent people who had somehow incurred the wrath of a member of the IRA.

=== Infiltration of the IRA ===
According to McGartland's autobiography, he later infiltrated the IRA in autumn 1989, having been asked to join by Davy Adams, a leading IRA member and a nephew of Sinn Féin leader Gerry Adams. This was after being recommended by a childhood friend, Harry Fitzsimmons, part of an IRA bomb team, whom McGartland often drove around Belfast. Davy Adams immediately gave McGartland his first assignment, which was to check the house of a well-known Ulster Volunteer Force (UVF) figure. McGartland was given the code name Agent Carol by the RUC.

Holding the rank of lieutenant in the IRA Belfast Intelligence unit, he ended up working mainly for Davy Adams, whom he drove to meetings and to survey potential IRA targets. McGartland had a special tracking device attached to his car. He was also recruited by an IRA Active Service Unit (ASU) which was headed by a man known as "Spud". He convinced his IRA associates that he was a committed member of the organisation and he successfully led a double life, which was kept secret even from the mother of his two sons. From 1989 to 1991, he provided information about IRA activities and planned attacks to the RUC Special Branch. During his time as a Special Branch intelligence agent, he became close to senior IRA members, having daily contact with those responsible for organising and perpetrating the shooting attacks and bombings throughout Northern Ireland. He also worked closely with Belfast actress Rosena Brown, a prominent and highly skilled IRA intelligence officer.

Working in the IRA Intelligence unit enabled McGartland to learn about the organisation's command structure pertaining to finance, ordnance, intelligence and the detailed planning of operations. He discovered how IRA sympathisers had infiltrated various public institutions and businesses, and many members acquired computer skills, thereby enabling the IRA to gain access to detailed information on a wide range of people in Northern Ireland including politicians, lawyers, judges, members of the security forces, Ulster loyalist paramilitaries, and prison officers.

Although McGartland says he prevented the IRA from carrying out many "spectaculars", including the planned bombing of two lorries transporting British soldiers from Stranraer to Larne that could have resulted in the loss of over a dozen lives, his reported greatest regret was his failure in June 1991 to save the life of 21-year-old Private Tony Harrison. Harrison, a soldier from London, was shot by the IRA at the home of his East Belfast fiancée where they were making wedding plans. McGartland had driven the IRA gunmen's getaway car and had been brought into the operation so late he had no time to advise his handlers, though he had previously indicated the IRA's interest in the area.

A taxi driver and republican sympathizer, Noel Thompson, who picked Harrison up at Belfast airport and informed the IRA was later jailed for 12 years for conspiracy to murder.

=== Exposed as an agent ===
In that same year 1991, McGartland provided information about a mass shooting attack planned on Charlie Heggarty's pub in Bangor, County Down, patronised by British soldiers after a general football match between the prison wardens. The RUC intercepted the two couriers delivering the guns to be used to shoot the soldiers and McGartland was exposed as an infiltrator.

McGartland wrote that diaries of the late Detective Superintendent Ian Phoenix, head of the Northern Ireland Police Counter-Surveillance Unit, showed that he and other Special Branch officers had advised senior RUC officers against stopping the gun couriers' vehicles, as doing so would put McGartland's life at risk and allow the actual IRA gunmen to escape. The penalty for informing on the IRA was death, often preceded by lengthy and often brutal interrogations.

With his cover blown, McGartland was kidnapped in August 1991 by Jim "Boot" McCarthy and Paul "Chico" Hamilton, two IRA men with previous convictions for paramilitary activities. He later alleged that McCarthy and Hamilton were also RUC informers based on what he had personally observed of the men during his kidnapping as he waited to be interrogated, tortured and subsequently executed. These allegations, however, were strongly denied by both men. McGartland escaped being killed by jumping from a third floor window in the Twinbrook flat where he had been taken for interrogation following his abduction.

== England ==
McGartland moved to the northeast coast of England, receiving nearly £100,000 (£220,700 today) to buy a house and establish a new life in Whitley Bay, Tyne & Wear, going by the name Martin Ashe. He failed in his attempt to receive compensation for his injuries.

Three years after moving to England, McGartland says the IRA sent his mother a Catholic mass card with his name written on it. Mass cards are sent as tokens of sympathy to bereaved families when a member of the family has died.

In 1997, his identity was revealed publicly by the Northumbria Police in court when he was caught breaking the speed limit and subsequently prosecuted for holding driving licences in different names, which he explained was a means of avoiding IRA detection. He was cleared of perverting the course of justice. In June 1997, the BBC broadcast a television documentary on his story.

Journalist Kevin Myers praised McGartland's heroism and the Sunday Express newspaper described him as a "real-life James Bond".

=== Shooting ===
In 1999, he was shot six times at his Whitley Bay home by two men, receiving serious wounds in the chest, stomach, side, upper leg and hand. He had attempted to wrestle the gun away from his assailant, but was shot in the left hand, the blast almost destroying his thumb. He received assistance from his neighbours and was rushed to intensive care in hospital where he recovered from his injuries. The IRA was blamed. It was reported that he was relocated immediately, protected by 12 armed officers and given a specially armored car. Total costs associated with the incident, including the investigation, amounted to £1.5 million (£2.9 million today).

In 2000, Lord Vivian asked in the House of Lords whether the government intended to remove police protection from McGartland and was told by Lord Bassam of Brighton that "Individual protection arrangements are a matter for the chief constable of the police force concerned and are not discussed for security reasons."

The day after McGartland was shot, the incident, along with the murders of Eamon Collins, Brendan Fegan, and Paul Downey, was cited by Ulster Unionist leader David Trimble in an interview with reporters in Belfast, to question whether the IRA ceasefire was being maintained. He reminded Mo Mowlam, Secretary of State for Northern Ireland, that this was a condition of the early release of paramilitaries under the Good Friday Agreement. A week later, it was mentioned in the Northern Ireland Grand Committee as evidence that IRA arms decommissioning had not taken place, and in January 2000 by Robert McCartney in the Northern Ireland Assembly.

In 1997 McGartland published a book about his life, Fifty Dead Men Walking. The title indicates the number of lives he considers he saved through his activities. The following year he won his lawsuit against Associated Newspapers, publishers of the Daily Mail, the Evening Standard and This is London web site, which had published an article alleging the shooting might be related to connections with local criminal gangs.

McGartland criticised the police for inadequate protection, but offered to testify on their behalf, saying: "There are people who have been the victims of terrorist attacks, who've lost loved ones, and some of them haven't been compensated. It's a scandal. I am the victim of an attack and I got around £50,000 in compensation, which is not a big amount considering my injuries. I'm not complaining. At the end of the day I was grateful to be alive. The reason I will help Northumbria Police is that this is an injustice."

In 2003 Scott Monaghan, a suspect in the shooting, sued Northumbria police. Monaghan's main claims were for false imprisonment, assault and wrongful interference with goods. They were rejected by the High Court in January 2006. However, he was awarded £100 for a delay in returning items of property. As of September 2008, no one has been charged with the shooting.

=== Threats to his family ===
After the 1994 ceasefire, McGartland appealed to be allowed to return home to West Belfast. When he asked Sinn Féin president Gerry Adams when he would be able to, he was informed that it was a matter between him and the IRA. McGartland has said that his relatives have received harassment from Republicans; in 1996, his brother Joe was subjected to a severe and prolonged IRA punishment beating with baseball bats, iron bars and a wooden plank embedded with nails. The assault left him using a wheelchair for three months.

In August 2006 Ian Paisley told Peter Hain, Secretary of State for Northern Ireland, "We have also heard how the sister of IRA informer Martin McGartland was told by police that her safety was under threat. This news broke immediately after the Secretary of State's comments that he believed the IRA had ended all of its illegal activity."

== Home Secretary denial ==
Despite McGartland being known as one of the best agents to operate during the Troubles, British Home Secretary Theresa May told a court in early 2014 that she refused to confirm or deny that he was a British agent working for MI5, offering as explanation "in case providing such information would endanger his life or damage national security".

McGartland responded by lambasting May, pointing out that "this is one of the daftest things I have ever heard; everyone who is interested knows my past ... "[n]o current security interest is at stake." After highlighting the two books he has written about his life as an undercover agent, one of which was made into a successful film, he also noted there have been six television documentaries on him and a number of newspaper articles. He went on to state, "the authorities wrote to the BBC back in 1997 admitting that I have been resettled and was being protected because of my service to them. I wonder how well briefed the Home Secretary is?"

May's department the Home Office oversees MI5 and she herself had signed the application in a court case brought by McGartland and his partner, both of whom are obliged to live under secret identities that were provided by MI5. McGartland additionally has a contract which was signed by MI5 after he was shot in England in which the representatives of the PSNI and Northumbria Police acknowledged his service in general terms. Because he is unable to claim State benefits due to security reasons MI5 had previously helped him financially; however this assistance was withdrawn after he gave an interview to the Belfast Telegraph. He commented, "Refusing to confirm or deny my role is simply a trick to avoid the State's responsibilities toward someone who has risked his life for it."

In the same month, May made an application using the controversial "Closed Material Procedures" (CMPs) which are secret courts under the recent Justice and Security Act. If these were to be used in McGartland's lawsuit against the government for negligence and breach of contract, they would ensure that the public, media, as well as McGartland and his lawyers, would be denied access to the hearings. Instead his case would be heard by a "Special Advocate". By not being present with his lawyers at the closed court, he would not be privy to anything pertaining to his case that the court submitted. McGartland pointed out that the case had nothing to do with national security or his undercover work 24 years earlier. May argued that were the government to confirm in one case that a person was an agent then refused to comment in another, that would give rise to the suspicion that the person worked as an agent thereby putting his life in danger, McGartland replied that May's argument would be reasonable if "those particular horses had not bolted long ago".

== Film ==
The film Fifty Dead Men Walking (the number of lives he believed he saved) inspired by his book went on general release in April 2009; the film was directed by Kari Skogland and starred Jim Sturgess as McGartland and Sir Ben Kingsley as Fergus, his British handler. McGartland disavowed the film, stating, "The film is as near to the truth as Earth is to Pluto."

== Bibliography ==
- Dead Man Running (softcover), Mainstream Publishing, 1999; ISBN 1-84018-276-8
- Dead Man Running: The True Story of a Secret Agent's Escape from the IRA and MI5, Hardcover, Mainstream Pub Co. Ltd, 1999; ISBN 1-84018-160-5
