= James Craig (loyalist) =

Northern Irish loyalist (1941-1988)

- James Craig
- Born: James Pratt Craig; 17 November 1941; Belfast, Northern Ireland
- Died: 15 October 1988 (aged 46); Belfast, Northern Ireland
- Cause of death: Multiple gunshot wounds
- Other name: Jim Craig
- Known for: Ulster Defence Association (UDA) fund-raiser and Inner Council member Racketeer

James Pratt Craig (17 November 1941 – 15 October 1988) was a Northern Irish loyalist paramilitary during The Troubles in Northern Ireland in the latter half of the 20th century, who was a member of the Ulster Defence Association (UDA), and a command member of its Inner Council. He also ran a criminal large-scale protection racket from the West Belfast Shankill Road area, where he resided. Described by journalist David McKittrick as "Belfast's foremost paramilitary extortionist", Craig allegedly colluded at times with the enemies of the UDA, Irish Republican groups such as the Provisional Irish Republican Army (IRA) and Irish National Liberation Army (INLA), providing them with information on key loyalists which led to their subsequent murders. Aside from controlling rackets and extorting protection money from a variety of businesses, it was claimed that Craig also participated in paramilitary murders.

He was accused by the Ulster Volunteer Force (UVF) of setting up the assassinations of some of their key members by IRA hit squads, such as Shankill Butcher members Lenny Murphy, John Bingham, and William "Frenchie" Marchant in the 1980s. Craig was himself killed by the UDA, using their cover name of the Ulster Freedom Fighters (UFF), for alleged "treason" as it was believed he had passed information to the IRA regarding South Belfast UDA commander John McMichael, who was killed by an IRA booby-trap car bomb in December 1987. Craig was shot dead in The Castle Inn, a pub in Beersbridge Road, East Belfast.

== Ulster Defence Association ==
=== Beginnings ===
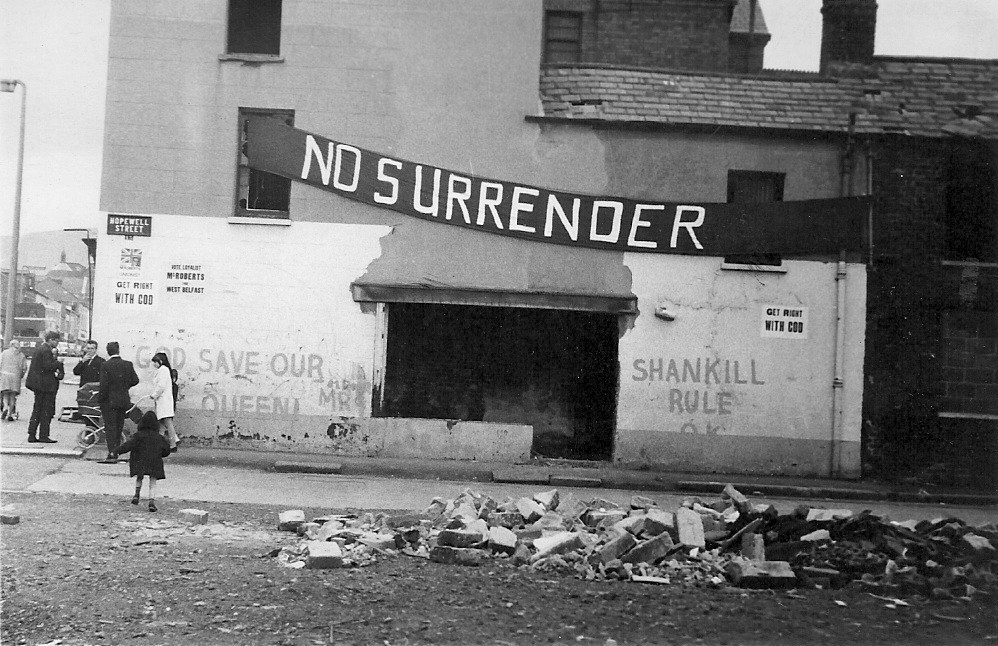
The Shankill Road area, early 1970s

James Pratt Craig, known as Jim, was born in Belfast in 1941 and grew up in an Ulster Protestant family on the Shankill Road. In the early 1970s, Craig, a former boxer, was sent to the Maze Prison for a criminal offence unrelated to paramilitary activities. While serving his sentence at the Maze he joined the Ulster Defence Association (UDA), and he was asked by the organisation's commander at the time, Charles Harding Smith to take control of the UDA prisoners inside, on account of his reputation as a "hard man".

=== Criminal activities ===
After his release in 1976, he set up a large protection racket and became the UDA's chief fundraiser; by 1985 he had managed to blackmail and extort money from a number of construction firms, building sites, as well as pubs, clubs, and shops in Belfast and elsewhere in Northern Ireland, whose intimidated owners paid protection money out of fear of Craig and his associates. It was alleged that the UDA received hundreds of thousands of pounds some of which also found their way inside Craig's pockets as part of his "commission". He was acquitted on a firearm charge and Ulster Freedom Fighters (a cover name for the UDA) membership on 18 March 1982. In 1985, Craig was brought to court after a number of businessmen decided to testify against him, with the condition that their identities remained hidden. The case fell apart when Craig's defence argued that his client's rights were violated by the concealment of the witnesses' identities.

Craig was alleged to have been involved in the double killing of a Catholic man and a Protestant man on the Shankill Road in 1977. The men, both colleagues, had entered a loyalist club and were later stabbed, shot and put into a car which was set on fire. By this time the West Belfast UDA no longer wanted him in their ranks, as they claimed they could no longer "afford him". Craig, who was ordered to leave the Shankill Road, went on to join forces with John McMichael's South Belfast Brigade. In addition to being the principal fundraiser, Craig also sat on the UDA's Inner Council. Craig usually travelled in the company of his bodyguard Artie Fee, a UDA member from the Shankill Road.

The rival Ulster Volunteer Force (UVF) carried out an investigation after it was rumoured Craig had been involved in the death of UVF major William Marchant, who was gunned down by Provisional IRA gunmen from a passing car on the Shankill Road on 28 April 1987. Marchant was the third high-ranking UVF man to be killed by the IRA during the 1980s. Although their inquiries revealed that Craig had quarrelled with Marchant as well as Lenny Murphy and John Bingham prior to their killings, the UVF felt that there was not enough evidence to warrant an attack on such a powerful UDA figure as Craig.

In December 1987, when South Belfast UDA brigadier John McMichael was blown up by an IRA booby-trap car bomb outside his home in Lisburn's Hilden estate, it was believed that Craig had organised his death with the IRA. Allegedly Craig had feared McMichael was about to expose his racketeering business, thus putting an end to his lucrative operation. McMichael had reportedly set up an inquiry and discovered that Craig was spending money on a lavish scale, going on holidays at least twice a year and indulging in a "champagne lifestyle". At the same time it was suggested that Craig had made certain deals with Irish republican paramilitary groups, dividing up the rackets in west Belfast, and he would have been doing the IRA a favour by helping them to eliminate a high-profile loyalist such as McMichael. Craig had established links with republicans during his time in prison, and the profitable deals and exchanges of information between them ensured he would most likely not be a target for IRA assassination.

Craig was named as an extortionist in Central Television's 1987 programme The Cook Report. Craig planned to sue the programme's producers for libel; in January 1988, Jack Kielty (father of future television presenter Patrick Kielty), a building contractor from County Down who had promised to testify as a key witness against Craig, was murdered by the UDA. This killing was attributed to Craig, although it was never proven.

== Death ==
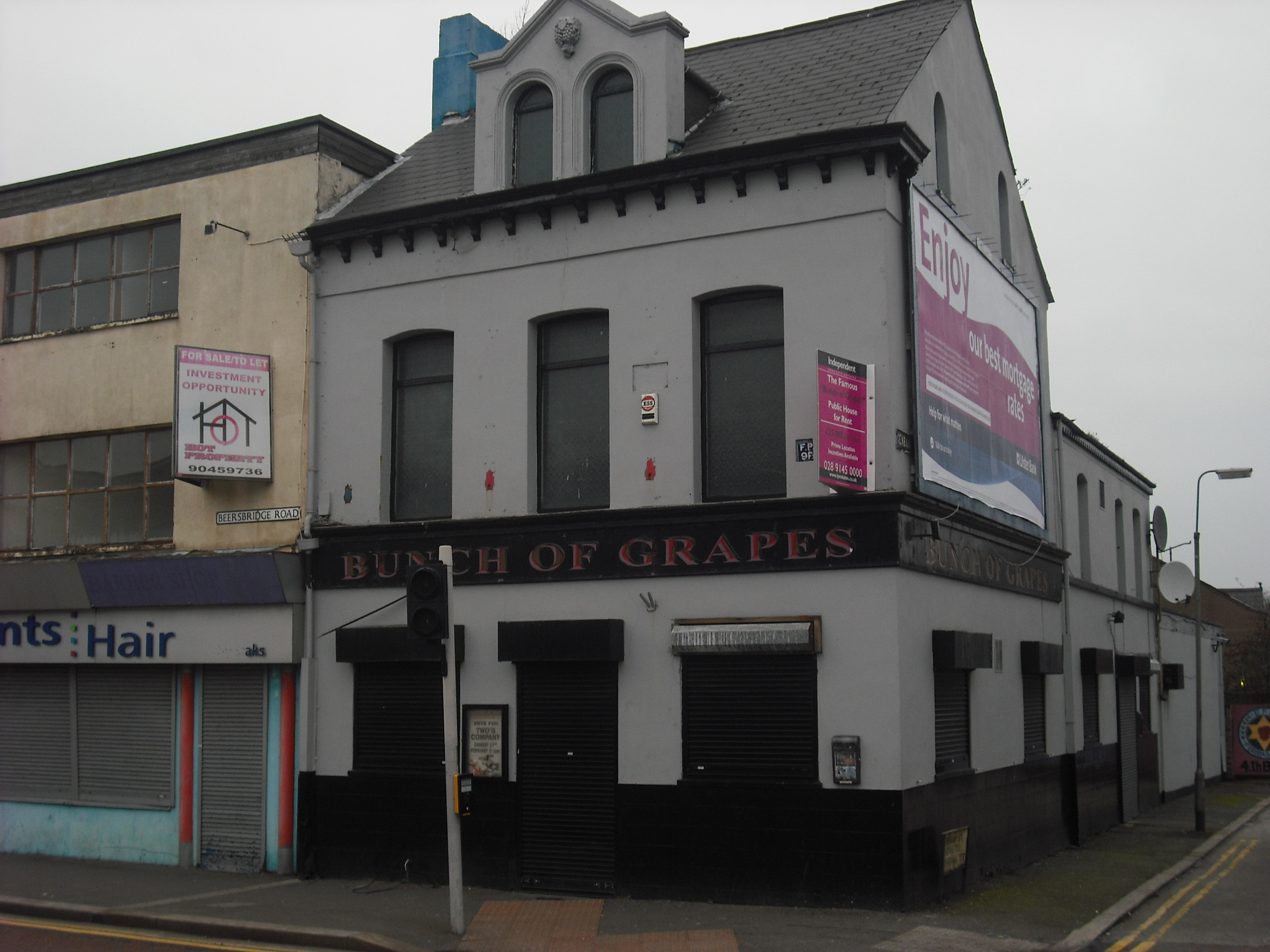
"Bunch of Grapes" pub in Beersbridge Road, east Belfast where Craig was shot dead. At the time it was called "The Castle Inn"

Craig was shot dead by two gunmen from the UDA in "The Castle Inn" (later called "The Bunch of Grapes"), a pub in Beersbridge Road, east Belfast on 15 October 1988, to where he had been lured in the belief that there was to have been a UDA meeting. He was playing pool in the pub at the time of his fatal shooting by the two men, both of whom were wearing boiler suits and ski masks and carrying automatic weapons. Upon spotting Craig they opened fire, spraying the room with gunfire. Craig died instantly; a bystander pensioner was also murdered in the attack, and four other bystanders were wounded by stray bullets. The UDA claimed the killing was carried out due to Craig's "treason" and involvement in John McMichael's murder as they knew he had provided the IRA with information to successfully carry out the assassination. They apologised for the unintentional death of the pensioner. Craig was not given a paramilitary funeral, and none of the UDA's command attended it.

Andy Tyrie, the UDA's former supreme commander, was not convinced of Craig's complicity in McMichael's killing. In an interview with Peter Taylor, he stated that after McMichael's death, the UDA set up an inquiry, but couldn't find any solid proof which linked Craig to McMichael's assassination. Tyrie maintained that the two men had been good friends, and that Craig had given McMichael £20,000 to keep the latter's pub (The Admiral Benbow) from failing. Tyrie suggested that Craig was a suspect because his wife was Catholic. Tyrie insisted that John Hanna, a prison officer in the Maze, had supplied the IRA with information about McMichael through Rosena Brown, a Belfast actress and IRA intelligence operative, with whom Hanna had been infatuated.

McMichael's son, Gary, however, firmly believed Craig to have been the person behind his father's killing. Less than three months after McMichael's death, Tyrie himself narrowly escaped an attempt on his life by car bomb; he subsequently tendered his resignation as commander.

== Reputation ==
According to McKittrick, Craig's "notoriety and range of enemies meant he could have been killed by almost any paramilitary group, loyalist or republican". Described as stocky of build, he wore expensive clothing and jewellery and enjoyed a lavish lifestyle from the proceeds of his racketeering. Author and journalist Martin Dillon wrote that Craig was not intelligent but was "cunning, boastful and ruthless".

There was also much antipathy between him and UDA brigadier Tommy "Tucker" Lyttle due to Craig having allegedly made Lyttle's daughter pregnant. Lyttle died of natural causes in October 1995. It was later revealed that Lyttle had worked as an informer for the Royal Ulster Constabulary (RUC)'s Special Branch.

Craig reportedly invited RUC officers to an extravagant wedding reception held for his daughter. Author Sally Belfrage who encountered Craig at an "Eleventh night" party held at the UDA's east Belfast headquarters, summed him up as "the most personally powerful man I had ever met, with an air of animal force that inspired awe at the idea of its ever being let loose. He was also as drunk as I had ever seen anyone in my life who could still more or less negotiate a sentence and a sequence of steps." She claimed Craig had propositioned her; when she rebuffed his advances he took it in his stride, and grabbing a microphone, went on to lead the other revellers in a rendition of "The Sash My Father Wore".

Dillon, in his book about the violent loyalist gang, the Shankill Butchers, recounted how Craig casually killed a man in a UDA club after a fellow UDA member handed him a jammed pistol. Craig, testing the weapon, allegedly pointed it at a man who was playing pool, and shot him in the head, killing him instantly. Craig then gave orders for the man's body to be dumped in an adjacent alley. Dillon believes Craig had UDA commander William "Bucky" McCullough killed in October 1981 after the latter discovered Craig had been stealing funds from the UDA for his own personal use. The Irish National Liberation Army (INLA) had claimed responsibility for the killing.

Jackie McDonald, who was part of Craig's protection racket, was arrested in 1989. He had taken over McMichael's command of the South Belfast UDA, having been promoted to the rank of brigadier by Andy Tyrie in 1988. In January 1990, he was sentenced to 10 years' imprisonment inside the Maze for extortion, blackmail, and intimidation. McDonald was released in 1994. In an interview with Peter Taylor, he made the following statement regarding his former association with Craig:

I would say without a shadow of doubt the worst thing that ever happened to South Belfast, John McMichael and myself especially, was that Jim Craig ever had anything to do with our organisation.

One builder who later assisted the RUC when they set up an anti-racketeering unit, admitted that he had paid out protection money throughout the 1980s to Craig and his henchmen. The amount of money he handed over increased each year.

Dillon suggested that prior to Craig's killing, younger elements within the UDA, who were loyal supporters of McMichael, discovered (by means which Dillon did not divulge) that the RUC's anti-racketeering squad CI3 had videotaped a clandestine meeting between Craig and a member of the IRA's Northern Command, which is what reportedly sealed Craig's fate.
