= Christopher John Hanna =

Christopher John Hanna (c. 1947 – 27 December 1992), was a prison officer who held a senior position inside the Maze Prison, Northern Ireland. In June 1990 he was sentenced to life imprisonment at Maghaberry for helping the Provisional IRA kill colleague Brian Armour two years previously. He was also accused by former Ulster Defence Association (UDA) leader Andy Tyrie of complicity in UDA South Belfast brigadier John McMichael's death in 1987. McMichael was blown up by a bomb placed underneath his car. According to Tyrie, Hanna gathered information about McMichael when the latter visited loyalist inmates. Hanna in his turn passed on the information to local Belfast actress Rosena Brown, with whom Hanna was infatuated. Brown, dubbed the "IRA Mata Hari", served as an intelligence officer of the IRA. Hanna also passed on information about Armour to Brown, who was named at Hanna's trial.

Hanna was part of an IRA plan to stage a massive prison escape using weapons and explosives smuggled in by prison officers. The plan did not come to fruition.

Alleged former IRA member Sean O'Callaghan, who became an informer for the Garda Síochána, was a fellow inmate of Hanna whilst both were serving their respective sentences at Maghaberry. He described him as an "extremely dangerous and irrational man".

Hanna died of cancer at the age of 45.

== Prison service ==
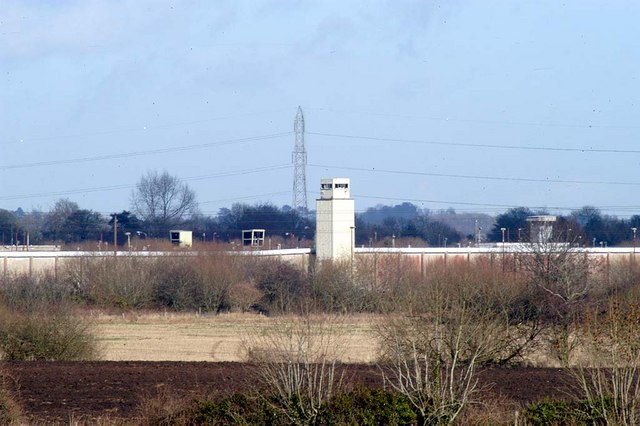
Maze Prison, outside Lisburn, where Hanna worked as a senior prison officer

Christopher John Hanna, known as John, was born in Northern Ireland in about 1947, and brought up in a Protestant family. In 1971, he joined the prison service. According to Sean O'Callaghan, Hanna's former inmate at Maghaberry, he was already a member of the illegal loyalist paramilitary organisation, the Ulster Volunteer Force (UVF). He allegedly helped the UVF to smuggle a bomb inside the Crumlin Road Gaol in order to kill an IRA prisoner. The plan failed; however, O'Callaghan alleged that he continued to collaborate with the UVF, Ulster Defence Association (UDA), IRA, as well as working for the Royal Ulster Constabulary (RUC) Special Branch. He was sent to the Maze Prison, on the outskirts of Lisburn, where he became one of the prison's highest-ranking officers. Northern Ireland's 3,000 prison officers were responsible for "the most dangerous prison population in Europe". A government report admitted that a large number of the officers were speedily recruited in the 1970s and that as result, their "quality was patchy". Hanna personally oversaw a staff of 22 men who controlled an H-Block that housed senior IRA prisoners. On some nights, he was duty officer in charge of the entire Maze Prison and as such he had access to every key.

== Collusion with the IRA ==
In his role as prison officer, he became part of a Provisional IRA plan to stage a massive breakout from the Maze using weapons and explosives brought into the prison by fellow officers. The plan, which involved a proposed escape of at least 25 IRA prisoners, failed to come to fruition. Sean O'Callaghan suggested that he colluded with the IRA yet kept RUC Special Branch informed of all that went on.

Former UDA commander Andy Tyrie alleged that he passed on information to the IRA regarding the movements of UDA South Belfast brigadier John McMichael to facilitate his assassination. The information was gleaned through conversations Hanna had with McMichael during the latter's visits to loyalist inmates. Hanna would then pass on the information regarding McMichael to Belfast Catholic actress Rosena Brown – dubbed the "IRA Mata Hari" – who was an IRA Intelligence officer with whom Hanna was deeply infatuated. Author Tony Geraghty, described Hanna, who was married with children, as a "womaniser". Hanna himself later admitted that he had been dominated by "a Provie woman". Rosena Brown was introduced to McMichael at his pub "Admiral Benbow" where she warned him that he was "being watched".

According to journalist Liam Clarke, Brown inveigled Hanna into providing her with information on top loyalists and his prison officer colleagues by using a mixture of "blackmail, political argument and seduction". The IRA had discovered that Hanna's daughter was living with a former IRA prisoner by whom she had a son. Hanna claimed he was warned by the IRA that if he did not use his senior position inside the Maze to help them, his "wee grandson might be coming home in a brown box".

On 22 December 1987, John McMichael was blown up by a booby-trap bomb attached to his car outside his home in Lisburn. An IRA unit, led by Sean Savage had carried out the attack. It was widely believed by most people, including RUC Chief Constable Sir John Hermon, that McMichael was set up by his fellow associates in the UDA. Racketeer and UDA "fundraiser" James Craig was shot dead by the Ulster Freedom Fighters (UFF) for allegedly helping the IRA to kill McMichael.

== Conviction and imprisonment ==
In 1988, Hanna arranged for the killing of a fellow prison officer Brian Samuel Armour with whom he had had a falling-out and sought to get revenge. By providing the IRA with Armour's home address, they were able to kill him by planting a booby-trap bomb underneath his car. Armour was killed on 4 October 1988 when the bomb exploded as he drove through Bloomfield in Belfast. Having joined the prison service in 1974, he later became vice-chairman of the Prison Officers' Association. Hanna was arrested by the RUC. Rosena Brown was named at his trial as having been the conduit through which Hanna passed on information about Armour, although she wasn't charged with Armour's assassination. In 1992, she and two men were caught with booby-trap bombs in their car, and on 10 September 1993, Brown received a 20-year prison sentence for conspiracy to murder. She was released in 1999 under the terms of the Good Friday Agreement.

Hanna was convicted in 1990 of helping the IRA to murder Armour and sentenced to life imprisonment and 27 concurrent sentences for conspiracy with the IRA. He was sent to Maghaberry Prison, near Lisburn.

At Maghaberry he befriended Sean O'Callaghan, the alleged former IRA member who had turned informer for the Garda Síochána. Believing O'Callaghan was still part of the organisation, Hanna gave him a list containing the names and addresses of high-ranking RUC officers and prison officials which was to be forwarded to the IRA. O'Callaghan instead gave it to the prison's security governor. In his book, The Informer, O'Callaghan described Hanna as having been "an extremely dangerous and irrational man".

== Death ==
Hanna died of cancer on 27 December 1992 at the age of 45. He was also suffering from multiple sclerosis. Prior to his death he had been transferred from the prison hospital to a civilian hospital which caused members of Armour's family to complain. Before he died he became reconciled to his estranged wife.
