= John McMichael =

Northern Irish loyalist (1948–1987)

- Born: 9 January 1948; Lisburn, County Antrim, Northern Ireland
- Died: 22 December 1987 (aged 39); Lisburn, County Antrim, Northern Ireland
- Cause of death: Multiple injuries resulting from a car bomb explosion
- Burial place: New Blaris Cemetery, Lisburn
- Other name: "Big John"
- Organization: Ulster Clubs
- Known for: UDA/UFF brigadier and Leader of the Ulster Democratic Party
- Political party: Ulster Democratic Party
- Spouses: Phyllis McMichael; Shirley McDowell
- Children: 2, including Gary McMichael
- Military career
- Paramilitary: Ulster Defence Association (UDA/UFF)
- Service years: 1970s – 1987
- Rank: Brigadier
- Unit: South Belfast Brigade
- Conflict: The Troubles

John McMichael (9 January 1948 – 22 December 1987) was a Northern Irish loyalist who rose to become the most prominent and charismatic figure within the Ulster Defence Association (UDA) as the Deputy Commander and leader of its South Belfast Brigade. He was also commander of the "Ulster Freedom Fighters" (UFF), a cover name for the UDA, overseeing an assassination campaign against prominent republican figures whose details were included in a notorious "shopping list" derived from leaked security forces documents. The UDA used the UFF name when it wished to claim responsibility for attacks, thus allowing it to remain a legal paramilitary organisation until August 1992 when it was proscribed by the British Government.

McMichael held political office as leader of the Ulster Democratic Party (UDP) from 1981 until his death. He was killed outside his home by a booby-trap car bomb which was carried out by the Provisional IRA.

== Ulster Defence Association ==
John McMichael was born in Lisburn, County Antrim on 9 January 1948, one of the children of John and Annie McMichael. He came from a working-class background, and was brought up in the Church of Ireland religion. He had married twice and was the father of two sons, Gary and Saul.

McMichael, who owned and operated the "Admiral Benbow" pub in his native Lisburn, initially rose to prominence in the UDA in the 1970s as the commander of the South Belfast Brigade and a member of its Inner Council, where he became known for his belief in the unique identity of Ulster Protestants, as well as his talent as an organiser. He had taken over command of the South Belfast UDA from Sammy Murphy, who had also led the Sandy Row unit. According to McDonald and Cusack, Murphy appeared to have been a commander rather than brigadier. Described as the UDA's most "effective and strategic leader", McMichael helped establish a political think tank called the New Ulster Political Research Group in 1977, and served as its chairman. He also assisted in the composition of a document entitled Beyond the Religious Divide which promoted independence for Northern Ireland along with a constitutional Bill of Rights—acceptable to both nationalists and unionists—as the "only hope of achieving a united Northern Ireland". This was the first step on the UDA's road to political development. He was a supporter of the ideas of Ian Adamson a paediatrician, and subsequently a Unionist politician, who self-funded a series of books and pamphlets about the alleged ancient origins of Ulster people as a separate ethnic group to the rest of the Irish.

By 1979 he had emerged as the leading figure within the UDA and the organisation's most charismatic senior member. According to the Belfast Telegraph, he drew up a 'shopping list' of targets (mostly members of Sinn Féin and other republican groups) that he felt the UDA should eliminate. Information about the individuals had been supplied to the UDA by individuals within the security forces who leaked the information. McMichael hand-picked his own squad for this task and throughout 1980 a number of the targets were assassinated. The new commando unit, which was known internally in the UDA as the Ulster Defence Force, carried out four murders in 1979, three of which were from the "shopping list". McMichael then turned his attention to members of the Relatives' Action Committee and on his orders Irish Independence Party leader John Turnley and Irish Republican Socialist Party (IRSP) activist Miriam Daly, both prominent within this republican prisoners' rights group, were killed. Rodney McCormick, a less prominent IRSP member, was killed in Larne soon afterwards before McMichael's team struck again, killing Irish republican Ronnie Bunting and his friend Noel Lyttle at Bunting's Turf Lodge home on 15 October 1980.

However the attacks came to an end in 1981, following an ambush by the Parachute Regiment after a failed attempt by the UFF on the lives of former MP Bernadette Devlin McAliskey and her husband, Michael McAliskey, at their home in Coalisland, County Tyrone, during which the three-man unit (including Ray Smallwoods who acted as the getaway driver) were captured and later imprisoned. Devlin McAliskey, who was shot nine times in front of her children, survived, as did her husband. McMichael himself was arrested in April 1981 in the wake of a Royal Ulster Constabulary (RUC) raid on UDA headquarters. He was brought before the court as it was alleged he and his men had organised the McAliskey shootings. Raymond Murray in his book SAS in Ireland claimed that the McAliskey shootings were planned in a room above McMichael's "Admiral Benbow" pub. Ultimately charges relating to McMichael's involvement, as well as his possession of classified information in the form of the details of republican activists leaked to him, were dropped along with similar charges against fellow arrestees Sammy McCormick, John McClatchey, Eddie Martin and Bobby McDevitt.

McMichael's "shopping list" was published in the press soon after the failed assassination attempt on McAliskey, apparently leaked by his internal opponents within the UDA. Michael Farrell was named as the next target, although he moved to Dublin before any attack could occur. The IRA responded to the revelations by killing two prominent Unionist figures, James Stronge and his father Norman at their Tynan Abbey home.

McMichael would return to the idea at later times and during the mid to late 1980s had Michael Stone working directly under him as a lone gunman with a remit to kill alleged republicans.

== Electoral politics ==
McMichael came to support the ideas of republican Danny Morrison regarding the Armalite and ballot box strategy and felt that the UDA should also build up a political wing to this end. As a result, following the murder of Robert Bradford, he stood as the Ulster Loyalist Democratic Party candidate in the by-election for Bradford's South Belfast seat and ran the most high-profile ULDP campaign ever seen, calling for a long-term strategy of negotiated independence for Northern Ireland. Despite fears from mainstream unionists that McMichael might split their vote, he ultimately only captured 576 votes. McMichael's failure to make any inroads into the popular vote led to the UDA largely abandoning electoral politics outside of the occasional local foray for over a decade.

After the failure of his political strategy, McMichael returned to his work with the UDA and, after the signing of the Anglo-Irish Agreement, he co-wrote another document Common Sense: Northern Ireland – An Agreed Process, which outlined plans for a future political settlement in Northern Ireland. Under the guidance of David Trimble, at the time a law lecturer in Queen's University Belfast, the document attempted to set out a legal framework for a power-sharing system under British rule. The paper was viewed positively by some politicians including Social Democratic and Labour Party (SDLP) leader John Hume and Secretary of State for Northern Ireland, Tom King.

McMichael and the UDA's Supreme Commander Andy Tyrie set up an elite group of men carefully selected from within the UDA; this unit, called the 'Ulster Defence Force' (UDF), was formed to make the organisation capable of meeting any "Doomsday" situation (such as a civil war) that might occur as a result of the Anglo-Irish Agreement. The group's motto was Sans Peur (French for "fearless".), and the men received training by former British soldiers. McMichael was also allegedly put in charge of a UDA/UFF bombing campaign that was to be waged against the Republic of Ireland. Ultimately the proposed campaign was unsuccessful. The four incendiary bombs planted in the city centre of Dublin in November 1986 failed to inflict much damage. McMichael himself put the failure down to the lack of bombing expertise in the UDA.

McMichael sat on the Ulster Clubs executive and its security committee. In June 1985, he instructed UDA Intelligence chief Brian Nelson to travel to South Africa to investigate the possibility of obtaining weapons by proposing an exchange of arms. Nelson, who was a British military intelligence agent recruited by the Force Research Unit, made the journey. When he returned from the trip he reported his findings to McMichael, who had previously received reports regarding Nelson's unsatisfactory conduct in South Africa.

Four years earlier, McMichael had hoped to draw Catholic support for Beyond the Religious Divide, having made the following statement

We'll just continue what we've been doing during the past year. It will become more and more obvious that the UDA is taking a very steady line, that we're not willing to fall into line behind sectarian politicians. It will take time. What people forget is that we also have to sell the idea to Protestants.

Paul Arthur, professor of politics at the University of Ulster, called him an "astute thinker". British journalist Peter Taylor, who met McMichael, described him as having been "articulate and tough", and his son by his first marriage, Gary, said of his father:

I think it was recognised that my father was no angel. He was a leader in a paramilitary organisation. Perhaps he'd been there and done that and bought the T-shirt. He was a well-respected person within the loyalist community and his credentials were extremely strong. People saw my father as someone who said that loyalism was at war with militant republicanism and he was unashamed about that. At that same time, he was also making a contribution to trying to push not just loyalism but everyone beyond conflict.

== Killing ==
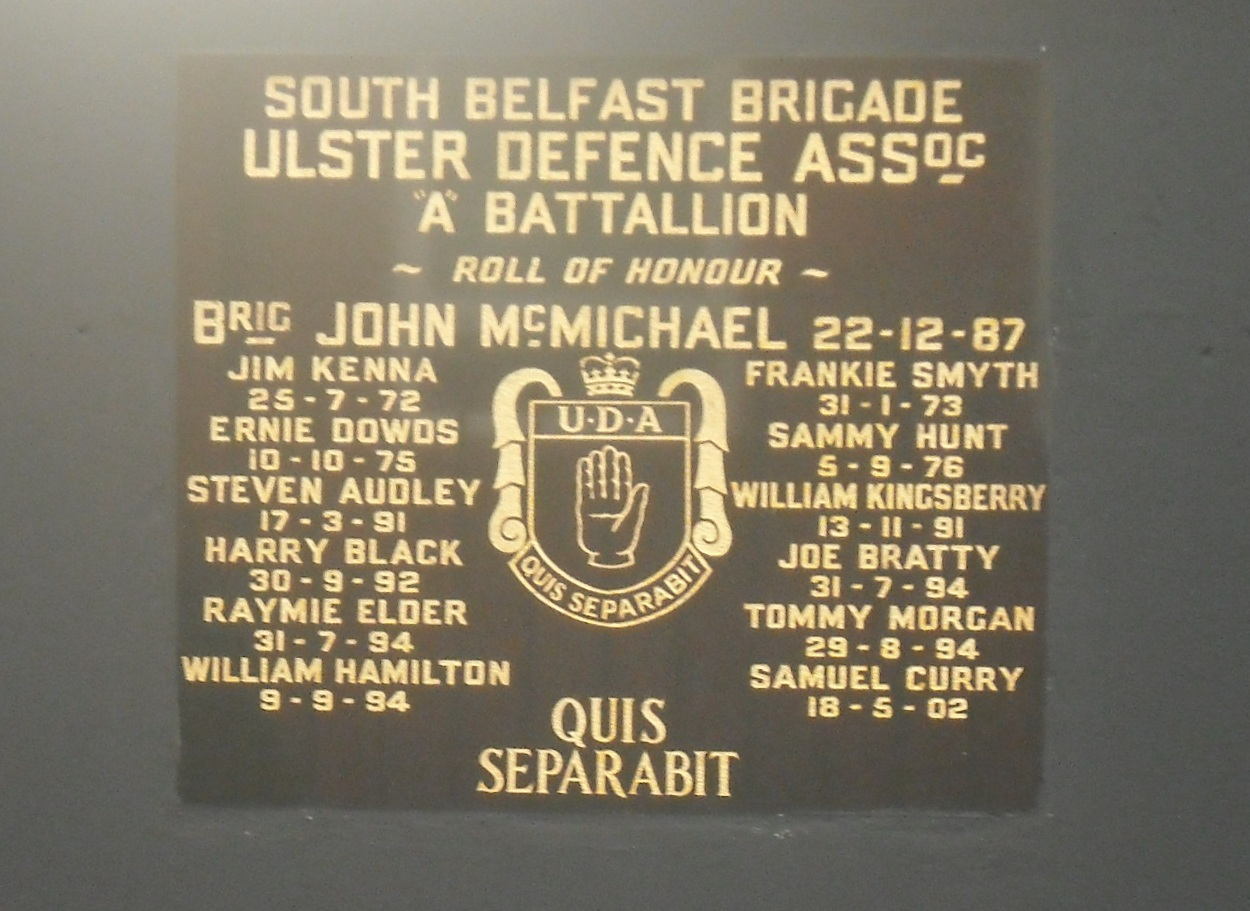
McMichael's name heads a list of South Belfast UDA on this Sandy Row plaque

McMichael was killed by a bomb attached to his car outside his Hilden Court home, in Lisburn's loyalist Hilden estate on 22 December 1987, shortly before his fortieth birthday. He was on his way to deliver Christmas turkeys to the families of loyalist prisoners. At 8.20 p.m. after he had turned on the ignition of his car and the vehicle slowly reversed down the driveway, the movement-sensitive switch in the detonating mechanism of the 5-pound (2.3 kg) booby-trap bomb attached to its underside was activated, and the device exploded. McMichael lost both legs in the blast and suffered grave internal injuries. He was rushed to Lagan Valley Hospital but died shortly afterwards.

His 18-year-old son, Gary had been attending a Stiff Little Fingers concert in Belfast's Ulster Hall at the time the bomb detonated. During the performance, a note was passed to the band's lead singer, Jake Burns, who then made an announcement that Gary McMichael was to phone his home. McMichael had initially planned to take his two-year-old son with him to deliver the turkeys, but had changed his mind at the last minute. McMichael's wife, Shirley and son were inside the house at the time of the explosion. She later told the inquest into his death that he had been away from home for two weeks and had returned the day he was killed.

In the hours proceeding McMichael's funeral on Boxing Day 1987, the UDA sealed off Dromore to enable a volley of shots to be fired into the air in the town square. The funeral was attended by 5,000 people; among the mourners were many unionist politicians including Rev. Ian Paisley. Representatives from the moderate SDLP were also in attendance. A large number of UDA members wearing combat uniforms marched in the procession behind the coffin which was preceded by the RUC and a bagpiper. The local Apprentice Boys of Derry formed a guard of honour with some carrying UDA wreathes as they escorted the coffin which was draped in UDA and Ulster flags. The UDA's commander Andy Tyrie was one of the pallbearers along with DUP deputy leader Peter Robinson. The family had wanted a loyalist flute band to lead the cortège but the request was rejected by the police. The funeral was held at the Lambeg Parish Church. At the burial service, Rev. Canon R. H. Lowry eulogised McMichael as "a man of great intelligence and ability, and a man of great kindness and one who had been working towards peace". Cardinal Tomás Ó Fiaich, Archbishop of Armagh and Primate of All Ireland described him as having been "untiring, fresh and constructive and ready to cross the religious divide to find a solution for Northern Ireland". McMichael was buried at the New Blaris Cemetery in Lisburn.

The People newspaper later summed up his death as having been a "blow to peace hopes in Northern Ireland at the time".

=== Allegations ===
The attack was claimed by the Provisional IRA, and carried out by a unit led by Seán Savage, who would himself be shot dead by the SAS in Gibraltar three months later in "Operation Flavius". At the time, however, the Royal Ulster Constabulary (RUC) hinted that some within the UDA may have had knowledge that the assassination was about to happen. The UDA backed the killing of racketeer and UDA fund-raiser James Pratt Craig by the Ulster Freedom Fighters (UFF) in 1988, claiming that he had been involved in planning the murder of McMichael. According to author Martin Dillon, McMichael had begun an inquiry into Craig's racketeering business, and Craig, fearing McMichael would put a stop to his lucrative protection operation, passed on information to the IRA which led to the assassination.

Prior to his death, McMichael had his own personal bodyguard and changed his car every two weeks. McMichael had been warned that the IRA had already made an attempt to kill him just one week before his assassination. McMichael's son, Gary is firmly convinced that Craig was involved in his father's killing. Another suspect was West Belfast brigadier Tommy Lyttle, who it was alleged helped set him up under orders by the security forces after it was rumoured McMichael was planning to carry out a bombing campaign against the Irish Republic. McMichael's close friend and second-in-command, Jackie McDonald, who was appointed leader of the South Belfast Brigade following his death, opined that it was possible Lyttle had a hand in the killing rather than Craig. However, he added, "We just may never know". Later, it emerged that Lyttle was an RUC Special Branch informer. Lyttle in his turn placed the blame on Craig.

In response to a question put to him at a press conference held after McMichael's killing, Chief Constable of the RUC, Sir John Hermon gave the following statement:

The murder of John McMichael, whoever caused it, or whoever orchestrated it regardless of who may have committed it, was designed to cause grievous dissention and disruption and to eliminate a threat to whosoever that threat may have existed. I would not wish to take it further than that. But think of my words very carefully.

Andy Tyrie was not convinced of Craig's complicity in McMichael's killing; he instead put the blame on John Hanna, a prison officer in the Maze Prison, who obtained information about McMichael when the latter visited loyalist inmates and then supplied the IRA with the gathered information through Belfast Catholic actress, Rosena Brown with whom Hanna (a Protestant) was reportedly infatuated. Brown was an IRA intelligence operative. According to Tyrie, Brown was introduced to McMichael in the "Admiral Benbow"; McMichael was warned he was "being watched". Tyrie himself narrowly escaped an attempt on his life by a car bomb in March 1988. Shortly after the failed attack, Tyrie tendered his resignation as UDA commander. In an interview with Peter Taylor, Tyrie explained the IRA's possible motive for assassinating McMichael:

John was killed because he was the best person we had and the Republican Movement didn't like him. I didn't have anybody as astute in politics as he was. They also didn't like him because he was being listened to and they knew the loss we would incur with John being killed.

Tyrie said that on another occasion, McMichael, prior to being interviewed, would practice his replies to likely questions in front of a mirror.

=== Legacy ===
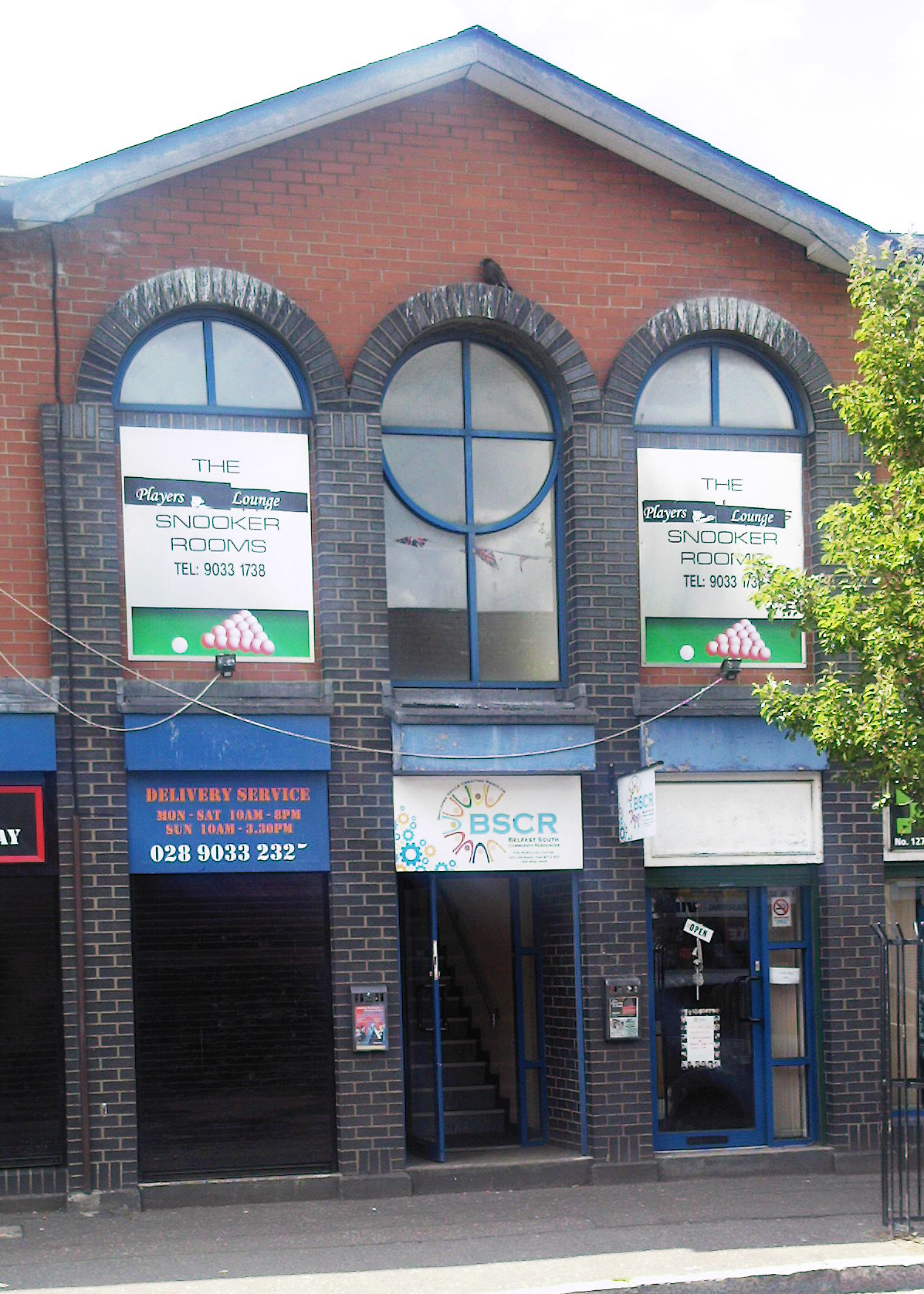
John McMichael Centre (Belfast South Community Resources)

McMichael's eldest son, Gary, followed in his father's footsteps of trying to build up the Ulster Democratic Party as a strong political wing for the UDA, but following the collapse of the party he dropped out of politics.

His widow, Shirley McMichael (née McDowell) is a member of the Forum For Victims and Survivors, a group established to bring healing to those who were themselves victims or lost loved ones in The Troubles. A community engagement worker for the Northern Ireland Policing Board, she is an adherent of Contemporary Paganism and a member of the Police Pagan Association.

The John McMichael Centre, a community centre in Belfast's Sandy Row area, is named in honour of McMichael. Its principal organiser is the UDA's incumbent leader and McMichael's successor, Jackie McDonald, who for a period had acted as one of McMichael's bodyguards. In a 2012 interview he recalled McMichael as having been "a very, very powerful man...had a great presence and great ideas – far, far ahead of his time".

As part of a series of events organised to commemorate the 25th anniversary of his death, a John McMichael memorial debate was held in Lisburn on 25 October 2012. It was hosted by Jackie McDonald and the Ulster Political Research Group (UPRG). Unionist politicians and senior republican leaders including Danny Morrison sat on the panel of guests. Among the topics discussed was McMichael's "Common Sense" document.

Party political offices
Preceded by New position	Leader of the Ulster Democratic Party; 1981–1987	Succeeded by Ken Kerr
Other offices
Preceded by Sammy Murphy (commander)	Ulster Defence Association South Belfast Brigadier; 1970s–1987	Succeeded by Jackie McDonald
