= Fifty Dead Men Walking =

2008 film by Kari Skogland

- US poster
- Directed by: Kari Skogland
- Written by: Kari Skogland
- Based on: Fifty Dead Men Walking: The Terrifying True Story of a Secret Agent Inside the IRA by Martin McGartland
- Produced by: Kari Skogland; Stephen Hegyes; Peter La Terriere; Shawn Williamson
- Starring: Ben Kingsley; Jim Sturgess; Kevin Zegers; Natalie Press; Rose McGowan
- Cinematography: Jonathan Freeman
- Edited by: Jim Munro
- Music by: Ben Mink
- Distributed by: Brightlight Pictures; Handmade Films
- Release dates: 10 September 2008 (Toronto International Film Festival); 10 April 2009 (United Kingdom); 31 July 2009 (Canada)
- Running time: 117 minutes
- Countries: United Kingdom; Canada; Ireland
- Language: English
- Budget: £6 million
- Box office: $1.7 million

Fifty Dead Men Walking is a 2008 English-language crime thriller film written and directed by Kari Skogland. It is a loose adaptation of Martin McGartland's 1997 autobiography of the same name. It premiered in September 2008, and stars Jim Sturgess as McGartland, a British agent who went undercover into the Provisional Irish Republican Army (IRA), and Ben Kingsley as Fergus, his British handler.

The film is set from 1988 until 1991, the time in which McGartland acted as an undercover agent within the IRA during the Troubles. In 1991, his cover was blown and he was kidnapped by the IRA, although he later escaped from an interrogation and execution, and went into hiding.

At the time of the release of the film, McGartland was still in hiding. The film takes its name from McGartland's claim within his book to have saved the lives of fifty people (police officers, soldiers, and prison guards) during his time as an agent.

== Plot ==
Martin McGartland is a 21-year-old street hustler in Northern Ireland in the late 1980s. The Irish Republican Army wants to recruit him, but he is reluctant because of what he sees as their cruel street justice. Because of his connection to the community, the British police want him to infiltrate and spy on the IRA. Marty agrees because of the car and money he gets from the police and because he despises the IRA. The IRA accepts him as a Volunteer and in that position he learns of various planned attacks. He then informs Fergus, his police contact, to prevent these attacks. He builds up a new sense of self-esteem, but he cannot tell his family and friends about his activities. Even his new girlfriend Lara only notices that he seems to do some work for the IRA, which worries her.

All along, the British accept the risk that the IRA may discover that Marty works for them. They do not plan to rescue him in that case. When it happens, the IRA capture and torture Marty, but he manages to escape by throwing himself out of a window. His handler Fergus is now his only ally—he finds him and helps him hide. Fergus offers to arrange for Marty and Lara and their children to live in Scotland but Marty realises that she would never be able to feel safe. He then goes on the run to Canada alone, leaving his family behind. As shown at the start of the film, he is shot there by the IRA and survives.

== Cast ==
- Ben Kingsley as Fergus
- Jim Sturgess as Martin McGartland
- Kevin Zegers as Sean
- Natalie Press as Lara
- Rose McGowan as Grace Sterrin
- Tom Collins as Mickey
- William Houston as Ray
- Michael McElhatton as Robbie
- Gerard Jordan as Kieran
- Kris Edlund as Mrs. Conlan
- Paschal Friel as Jana
- George Edgar as bar man

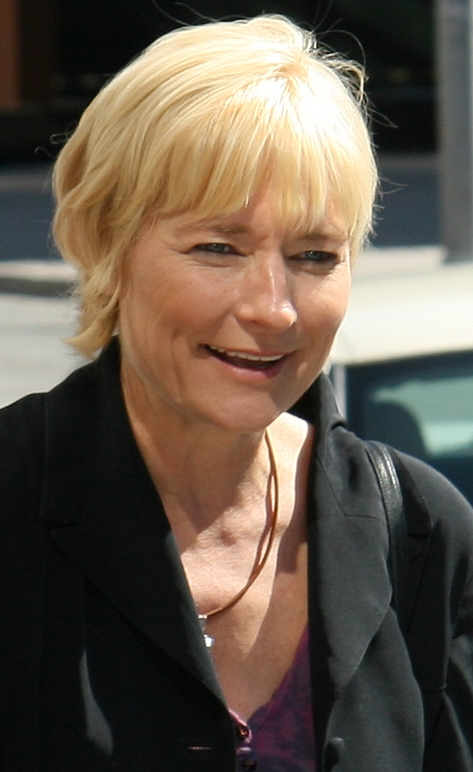
Kari Skogland at the 2008 Toronto International Film Festival

== Release ==
The film premiered on 4 September 2008 at the Toronto International Film Festival in Canada. The UK premiere was held on 4 April 2009 in Belfast, where the film was shot. Sturgess was unable to attend, as was Kingsley, who recorded a video message for the audience. Phoenix23, the Belfast band who recorded three tracks for the soundtrack; "Hit the Ground Running", "Its a Blast" and "Hurricane" were in attendance. The film went on general release in the UK on 10 April 2009.

== Critical reception ==
Rotten Tomatoes reports that 83% of 52 critics gave the film a positive review; the average rating is 6.7/10. The website's critical consensus reads: "Though somewhat uneven in places, Fifty Dead Men Walking is a gripping portrayal of Ireland's violent history, carried by the strong performances of its lead actors." Metacritic reports the film has an average score of 57 out of 100 based on 16 reviews, indicating "mixed or average reviews".

Roger Ebert gave Fifty Dead Men Walking three out of four stars. Empire awarded the film three out of five stars and praised Sturgess' performance, although they noted that "some stylistic slip-ups let him down a little." The Guardian awarded the film three out of five stars and said "producer-director Kari Skogland has put together an effective, if cinematically unambitious, enterprise."

Martin McGartland disowned the film as was reported in The Sunday Times on 29 March 2009. He told the publication that "they are saying it was based on a true story, but what is the definition of 'based on a true story'? Is it 50% true, 70% true, 10%?" The Sunday Times further reported that McGartland contended "that the movie is fundamentally a lie that misrepresents his career and his motivation. He believes that if Kari Skogland, the director, had stuck closer to the account he gave in his book and in a BBC documentary, then she would have had a better film."

== Accolades ==
On the basis of Canadian involvement in its financing, Fifty Dead Men Walking was nominated for Best Canadian Film at the 30th Genie Awards in 2010. The film won several awards, including Best Adapted Screenplay at the Genie Awards and Best Feature Length Drama at the Leo Awards.

It won the award for Best Western Canadian Film at the 2008 Vancouver International Film Festival.
