= List of defunct paramilitary organizations =

The following is a list of defunct paramilitary organizations.

== List of defunct governmental paramilitary units (in alphabetical order) ==
Name	Region	Active between	Type	Notes
Auxiliary Division (ADRIC)	United Kingdom (Ireland)	1920–1922	Counterinsurgency police unit	Formed as part of the Royal Irish Constabulary by the British government during the Irish War of Independence. Distinct from - but sometimes confused with - the Black and Tans.
Auxiliary Units	United Kingdom	1940–1944	Secret quasi-military irregulars	Also known as Home Guard Shock Squads, formed by the British Government during the Second World War to resist a potential invasion by Nazi Germany.
Barracked People's Police (KVP)	East Germany	1948–1956	gendarmerie	Formed by the Soviet Military Administration in Germany as the precursor to the National People's Army
B-Gendarmerie	Allied-occupied Austria	1949–1954	gendarmerie	Formed as the precursor to the Austrian Armed Forces
Black and Tans	United Kingdom (Ireland)	1920-1922	Paramilitary police reinforcement	Made up of former soldiers recruited from Great Britain to serve in the Royal Irish Constabulary during the Irish War of Independence. Distinct from - but sometimes confused with - the Auxiliary Division.
Bundesgrenzschutz	Germany	1951–2005	border guard	Responsible for border patrol and transport security. Also precursor to the Bundeswehr
Felix Dzerzhinsky Guards Regiment	East Germany	1954–1990	light infantry	Paramilitary unit of the East German secret service Stasi. Responsible for the security of the government leaders and government facilities. Dissolved during German reunification.
Grenztruppen	East Germany	1946–1990	border guard	Responsible for border patrol and prevention of Republikflucht, including along the inner-German border and the Berlin Wall. Dissolved during German reunification.
Dignity Battalions	Panama	1988–1990	light infantry	Created to oppose a foreign invasion. Dissolved after the U.S. invasion of Panama.
Fedayeen Saddam	Iraq	1995–2003	irregular unit	Created as an irregular military force separate from the Iraqi Armed Forces reporting directly to President Saddam Hussein. Dissolved after the U.S.-lead invasion of Iraq.
Haganah	Mandatory Palestine	1920–1948	Precursor of the Israeli army	Origins in guarding Jewish colonies
Kuva-yi Miliye	Turkey	1918–1921	irregular unit	Created as irregular military forces serving the Grand National Assembly during the Turkish War of Independence. Integrated into the Turkish Army.
National Police Reserve	Allied-occupied Japan	1951–1954	police reserve	Formed by the Japanese government and the Supreme Commander for the Allied Powers as a precursor for the Japan Self-Defense Forces during the Korean War.
ORMO	Poland	1946–1989	police reserve	Responsible for aiding the Milicja Obywatelska in suppressing demonstrations. Declined during the period of martial law in the 1980s and was officially dissolved by the Sejm in 1989.
Ulster Special Constabulary (USC)	United Kingdom (Northern Ireland)	1920-1970	Special constable police reserve	Quasi-military police reserve formed shortly before the partition of Ireland in what would later become Northern Ireland. After its official disbandment in 1970, former members formed the Ulster Special Constabulary Association.
Volkspolizei-Bereitschaft	East Germany	1955–1990	police reserve	Served as riot control and anti-insurgency regiment functioning alongside the Stasi. Dissolved during German unification.
Sarandoy	Democratic Republic Of Afghanistan	1978–1992	gendarmerie	Nicknamed "Defenders of the Revolution", Sarandoy was founded after the Saur Revolution and specialized in counterinsurgency and internal security. At its peak Sarandoy had 115,000 men and women under their command. Sarandoy was run by the Khalq faction of the People's Democratic Party of Afghanistan and would occasionally clash with the Parchamite-dominated KHAD.
Sicherheitspolizei	Germany	1919–1935	security police	Formed by Gustav Noske and the Reichswehr to control political violence from paramilitary parties after the German Revolution. Integrated into the Gestapo and the Reichswehr after the Nazi takeover.
Zelene Beretke	Bosnia and Herzegovina	1991–1992	Paramilitary	They were mostly active during the war in the early part of 1992 in northern and central Bosnia

== List of defunct non-governmental paramilitary units ==
=== Australia ===
- The New Guard of Australia

=== Austria ===
- The Heimwehr of the Fatherland Front in Austria
- The Ostmärkische Sturmscharen of the Catholic Youth in fascist Austria
- The Republikanischer Schutzbund of the Social Democratic Party of Austria

=== Czechoslovakia ===
- People's Militias of the Communist Party of Czechoslovakia
- Republikanische Wehr of the German Social Democratic Workers' Party in the Czechoslovak Republic
- Purple Legion of the Czechoslovak Traders' Party
- Freedom Guard Union (1932–1939) of the Czechoslovak National Social Party
- Gray Legion (1934–1939) of the National Unification
- Hungarian Szabadcsapatok
- Svatopluk Guard of the Vlajka
- Volkssport of the German National Socialist Workers' Party
- Freiwilliger deutscher Schutzdienst of the Sudeten German Party
- Sudetendeutsches Freikorps of the Sudeten German Party
- Rodobrana of the Slovak People's Party of Czechoslovakia
- Hlinkova garda of the Slovak People's Party in Slovakia

=== Finland ===
- For Independence
- Lotta Svärd
- Suojeluskunta, volunteer militia in Finland 1918–1944.
- Vientirauha

=== Germany ===
- The Roter Frontkämpferbund of the Communist Party of Germany during the Weimar Republic
- The Reichsbanner Schwarz-Rot-Gold of the Weimar Coalition during the Weimar Republic
- The Eiserne Front of the SPD with the ADGB, the Reichsbanner Schwarz-Rot-Gold and workers' sport clubs during the Weimar Republic.
- Der Stahlhelm of the German National People's Party in the Weimar Republic
- The Sturmabteilung of the Nazi Party in the Weimar Republic and Nazi Germany
- The Stoßtrupp-Hitler of the Nazi Party in Nazi Germany
- The Schutzstaffel of the Nazi Party in Nazi Germany
- The National Socialist Flyers Corps of the Nazi Party in Nazi Germany
- The National Socialist Motor Corps of the Nazi Party in Nazi Germany
- The Combat Groups of the Working Class of the Socialist Unity Party in East Germany

=== Great Britain ===
- Column 88
- Cornish National Liberation Army
- Dark Harvest Commando
- Free Wales Army
- Meibion Glyndŵr
- National Socialist Action Party
- National Socialist Movement (UK, 1997)
- Ny Troor Tromode

=== Hungary ===
- Rongyos Gárda
- The Munkásőrség in communist Hungary

=== India ===
- Salwa Judum
- Kuer Sena
- Ranvir Sena

=== Iran ===
- National Liberation Army of Iran

=== Ireland ===
- Down Orange Welfare
- Irish Citizen Army
- Irish People's Liberation Organisation
- Irish Republican Army (1919–1922)
- Irish Republican Army (1922–1969)
- Irish Revolutionary Forces
- Irish Volunteers
- Official Irish Republican Army
- Orange Volunteers (1972)
- Provisional Irish Republican Army
- Real Irish Republican Army
- Saor Uladh
- South Armagh Republican Action Force
- Ulster Protestant Volunteers
- Ulster Special Constabulary Association
- Ulster Volunteers

=== Italy ===
- The Blackshirts of the National Fascist Party in Fascist Italy
- The Squadrismo of the National Fascist Party in Fascist Italy

=== Japan ===
- The Yokusan Sonendan of the Imperial Rule Assistance Association in Empire of Japan
- The Volunteer Fighting Corps of the Imperial Rule Assistance Association in Empire of Japan

=== Mandatory Palestine ===
- Lehi
- Irgun

=== Pakistan ===
- Furqan Force

=== Poland ===
- National Armed Forces of the National Democracy

=== Romania ===
- The Patriotic Guards of the Romanian Communist Party in the Socialist Republic of Romania

=== Sweden ===
- The Munckska kåren in Sweden

=== Yugoslavia ===
- Serb Volunteer Guard

=== Others ===
- Ahlu Sunna Waljama'a in Somalia
- The Chetniks, royalist supporters of the Yugoslav government-in-exile in Yugoslavia in World War II
- Defense of the Revolution of the People's Democratic Party Of Afghanistan
- The Frikorps Danmark of the Nazi Party in Denmark
- The Hird of the Nasjonal Samling under the Quisling regime in the Reichskommissariat Norwegen
- The Self-Defense Forces of Colombia
- The Tonton Macoute of the National Unity Party in Haiti during the regime of François Duvalier
- Ukrainian Volunteer Corps
- Grey Legion of the National Unification, Taiwan

== See also ==
- List of Free Corps
- List of paramilitary organizations
- Paramilitary
