= Ulster Resistance =

Ulster loyalist paramilitary movement

Ulster Resistance (UR or URM)
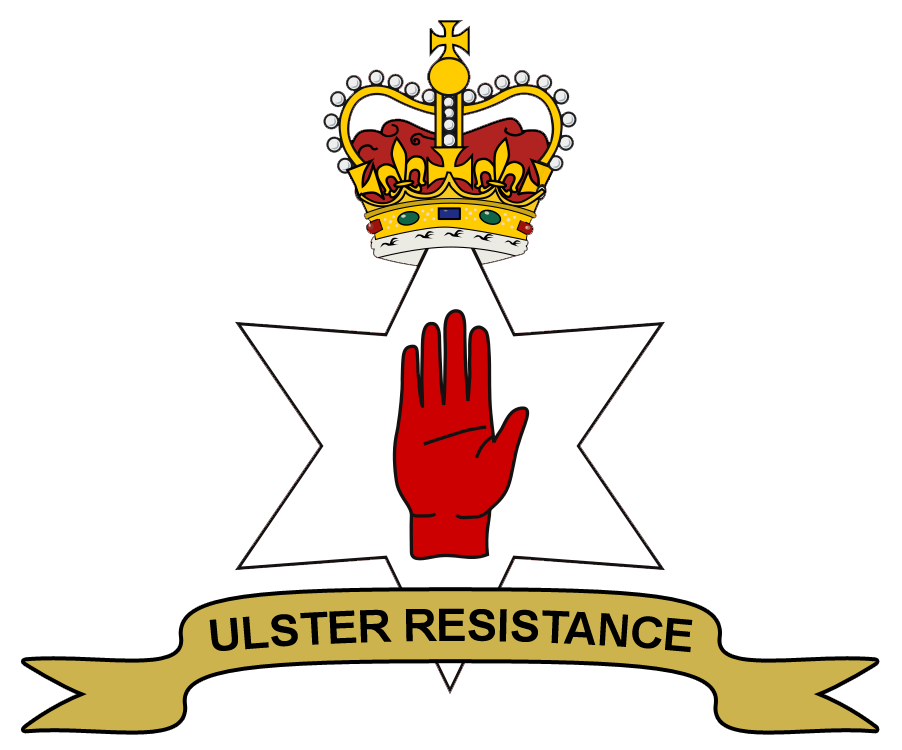
- Emblem used by Ulster Resistance.
- Dates active: November 1986–present
- Active regions: Northern Ireland
- Ideology: Ulster loyalism Irish unionism Anti-Catholicism
- Size: Unknown
- Wars: The Troubles

Ulster Resistance (UR), or the Ulster Resistance Movement (URM), is an Ulster loyalist paramilitary movement established by the Democratic Unionist Party (DUP) in Northern Ireland in November 1986 in opposition to the Anglo-Irish Agreement.

== Origins ==
Ulster Resistance was preceded by a number of attempts at forming paramilitary organisations by the DUP. In June 1976 senior DUP politician Peter Robinson approached another DUP politician, Clifford Smyth, secretary of the United Ulster Unionist Council, with a suggestion for a DUP paramilitary wing but it never materialised. In 1976 Smyth was then Intelligence Officer for the loyalist paramilitary grouping Tara, sitting on its six-man "brigade staff". According to a senior Ulster Defence Association (UDA) figure, the paramilitary organisation was also contacted later that year by a DUP member with a request for assistance in arming the DUP's new group. The DUP member particularly sought plans for home-made rocket launchers. This earlier attempt at a militant DUP force never materialised, although the United Unionist Action Council (UUAC), a sub-committee of the United Ulster Unionist Council, of which the DUP was the leading political party, had a semi-paramilitary wing already in the Ulster Service Corps (USC). The UDA, Down Orange Welfare, and the Orange Volunteers were also represented on the UUAC.

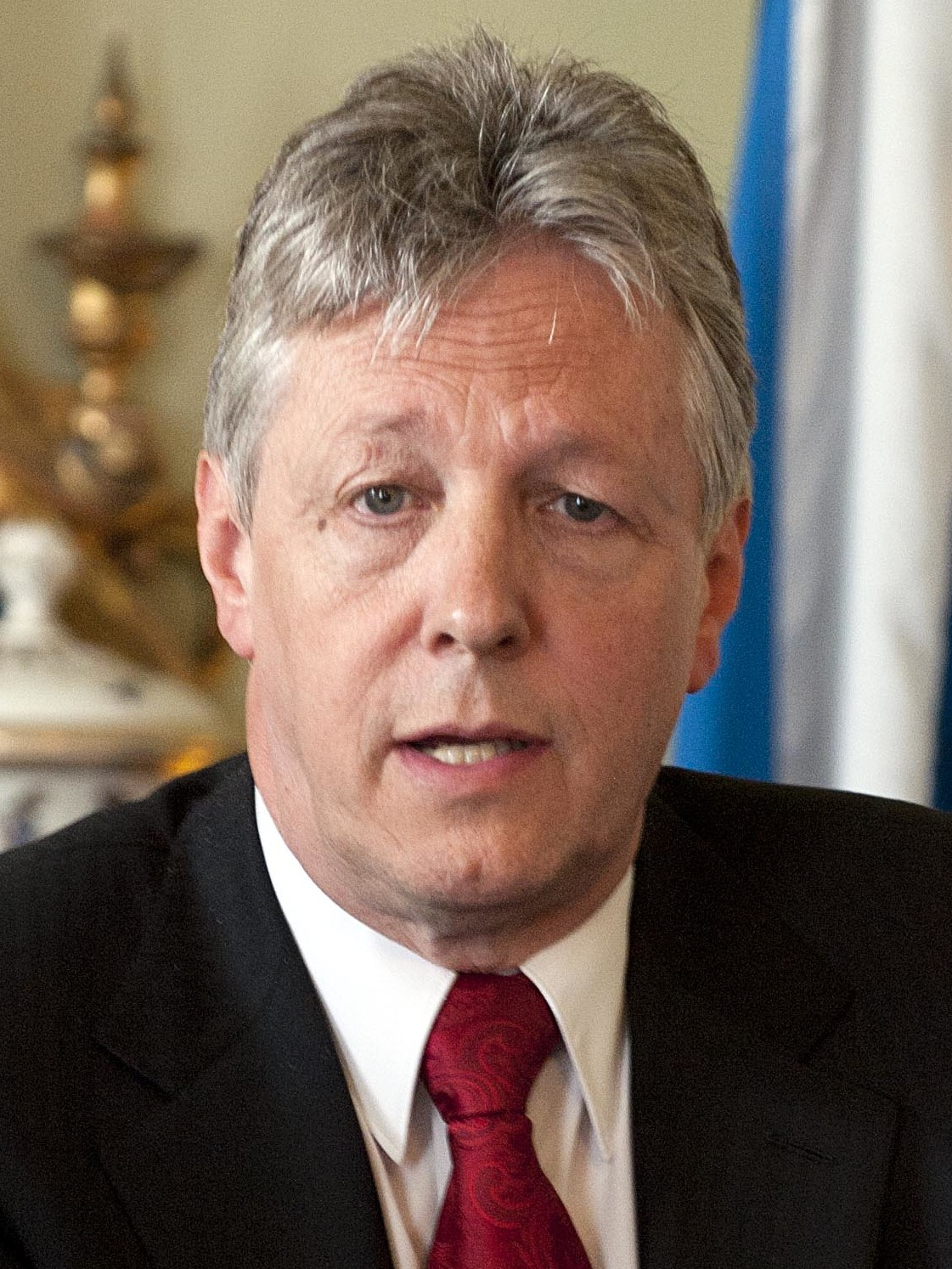
Peter Robinson was the DUP's deputy leader and a prominent figure in the founding of Ulster Resistance

The Anglo-Irish Agreement, signed by the British and Irish governments in November 1985, gave the Irish government an advisory role in Northern Ireland's administration. This new political initiative caused outrage amongst the Unionist community of Northern Ireland and there were months of protests, strikes, and street violence in response. DUP Press Officer Sammy Wilson threatened civil war in an interview shortly before the signing of the Agreement, in which "large sections of the Nationalist population would then be open to... retaliatory action" and Wilson himself would be a participant, although he "wouldn't relish it." In August 1986 DUP deputy leader Peter Robinson and several hundred Loyalists invaded the small Monaghan village of Clontibret. Days prior to its signing, DUP Chief Whip at the Assembly Jim Allister laid out the "carefully planned" Unionist response to the imminent Anglo-Irish Agreement. Firstly, Unionist politicians would attempt to disrupt the Agreement through Parliament, followed by a campaign of protest (petitions, by-elections, etc.), then an effort to make Northern Ireland ungovernable like the 1974 Ulster Workers' Council strike. The final phase according to Allister was:

...If we have done all that and we are still rejected, then they would have rendered me redundant as a politician, but they would not have rendered me redundant as an individual Loyalist, and then I would act in concert with hundreds of thousands of other individual Loyalists in arming ourselves. No self-respecting individual is going to do anything but resist. In those circumstances there are no lengths to which Ulster men would not go to stop it. None.

== Foundation ==
In the autumn of 1986, a meeting took place at a farmhouse near Omagh, County Tyrone. According to Peter Taylor, it was attended by five Unionist politicians (excluding Ian Paisley) and two members of the executive committee of the Ulster Clubs. At the meeting those in attendance discussed what form a new paramilitary organisation to fight the Anglo-Irish Agreement and Irish republicanism should take. The meeting concluded with a pledge that "whatever the cost to life or liberty" to see the endeavour through; a private army prepared to "fight to the bitter end". The Sunday Tribune reported that the acquisition of weapons was discussed and armed men guarded the doors during the meeting.

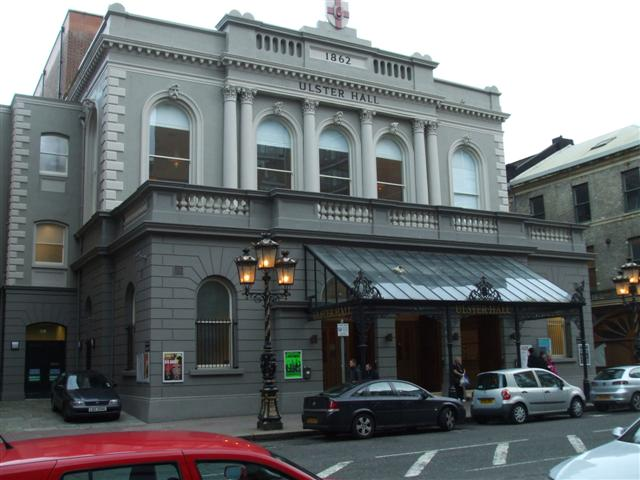
Ulster Hall in Bedford Street in Belfast city centre

Ulster Resistance was launched at a 3000-strong invitation-only (male-only) meeting at the Ulster Hall on 10 November 1986. The rally was chaired by DUP Press Officer Sammy Wilson and addressed by party colleagues Ian Paisley, Peter Robinson and Ivan Foster. A colour party wore paramilitary uniforms and red berets. Ian Paisley told the assembled crowd that Ulster Resistance would "take whatever steps are necessary to destroy the Anglo-Irish Agreement and the ongoing republican conspiracy." He added that "law abiding Roman Catholics have nothing to fear." He was then filmed dramatically placing a red beret on his head and standing to attention. DUP deputy leader Peter Robinson was also photographed wearing the militant loyalist paramilitary regalia of beret and military fatigues at the rally. Also on the platform was Alan Wright, the chairman of the Ulster Clubs. Journalists who arrived at Ulster Hall to investigate the event were denied entry, DUP press officer Nigel Dodds instead appeared and handed out leaflets stating the goals of the new paramilitary grouping. The launch rally was followed by a number of similar assemblies across Northern Ireland. Its aim was to "take direct action as and when required" to end the Anglo-Irish Agreement.

Most of the political figures who appeared at the rally were members of the DUP, however both North Belfast MP Cecil Walker and Frazer Agnew of the Ulster Unionist Party (UUP) attended contrary to UUP party leader James Molyneaux's advice. Molyneaux said he did not object in principle to loyalist paramilitary groups assassinating members of the Provisional IRA, but added that his problem was "identifying the target".

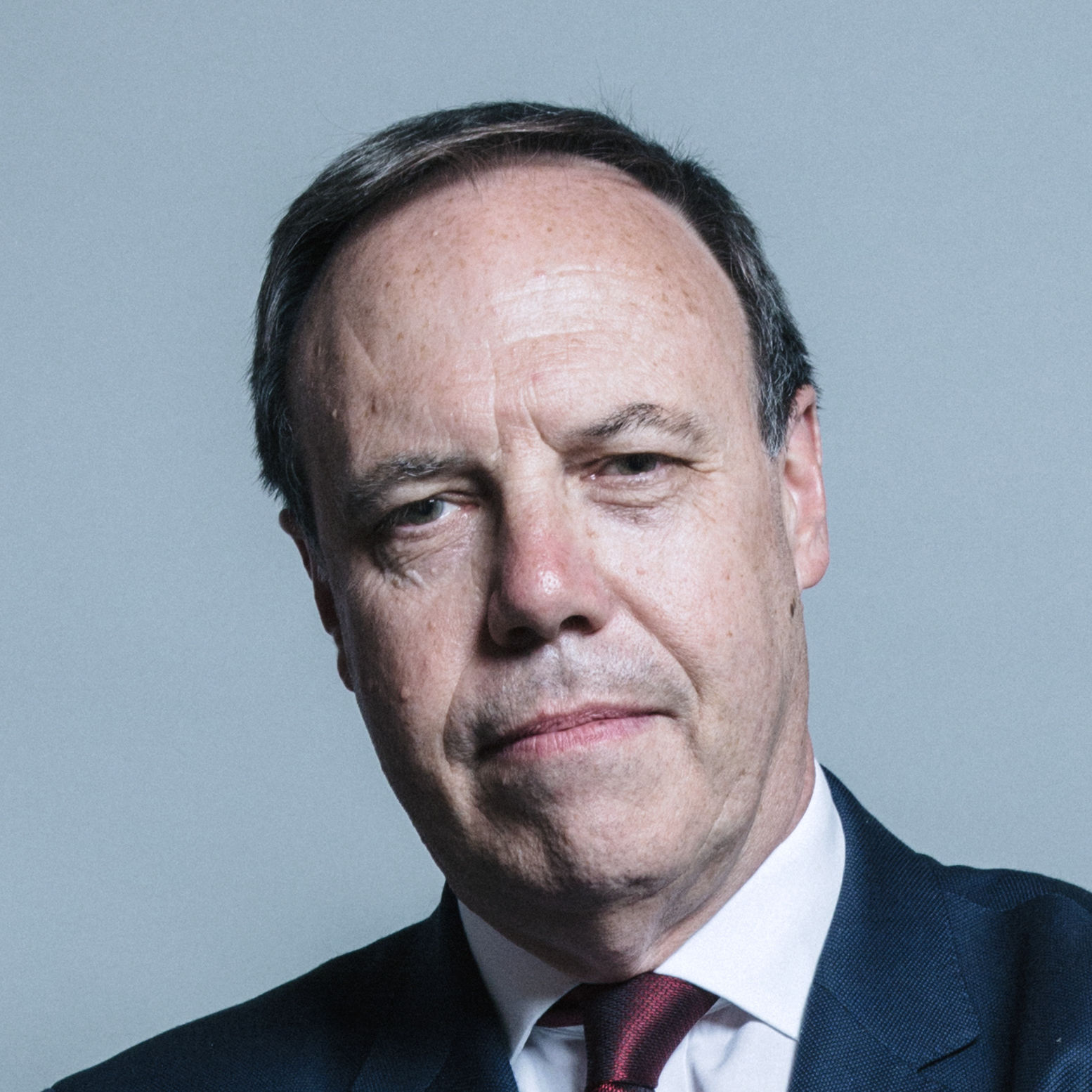
DUP press officer Nigel Dodds first introduced Ulster Resistance to journalists

Walker later claimed he was unaware before the meeting that its purpose was to declare the founding of a paramilitary grouping, while Agnew stated he would not be opposed to a "citizen's army" that came into conflict with the law. Some members of the UUP felt the new paramilitary group represented a "final straw" in the strained DUP–UUP political pact against the Anglo-Irish Agreement. Alan Chamber, chairman of the Greater Belfast Young Unionist Association, accused the DUP of being "increasingly intent on breaking all links with the mainland so they can set up a fourth rate nation independent Paisleyland". UUP MP Harold McCusker told a journalist that "there may well be circumstances" where he would consider joining Ulster Resistance.

Ulster Resistance's first public rally was held in Kilkeel, County Down, opening with a march led by a military-style colour party. As the several thousand strong crowd marched through Kilkeel, some participants threw stones over barriers erected by the RUC in the religiously mixed town and later the visibly hostile crowd attacked a press photographer and stole his film, after the march had culminated at an Orange hall. Speaking before nine paramilitary standard bearers, Ian Paisley urged all listening to join Ulster Resistance. Peter Robinson told those assembled "Better to be dead than green" and "We need a body of men right across the province, prepared to die for Ulster." Ulster Clubs leader Alan Wright declared the new paramilitary group would initially turn its force against the Anglo-Irish Agreement and then turn to destroy its real enemy – militant republicanism, Sinn Féin and the IRA.

At a rally in Enniskillen, County Fermanagh, Peter Robinson announced: "Thousands have already joined the movement and the task of shaping them into an effective force is continuing. The Resistance has indicated that drilling and training has already started. The officers of the nine divisions have taken up their duties." Robinson warned at the rally that those who were "faint or half-hearted" shouldn't bother signing up. At a rally in Larne, Ian Paisley threatened that while Margaret Thatcher could ignore thousands of protestors at Belfast City Hall, maybe she would listen if those thousands had guns in their hands. Ivan Foster told a newspaper that Ulster Resistance had access to Royal Ulster Constabulary (RUC) intelligence and would use it to target and kill suspected members of the Provisional Irish Republican Army (IRA). Foster had previously stated that "there's no good carrying a gun if you don't intend to use it."

In Ballymena, County Antrim, Jim Allister, Peter Robinson, and Alan Wright led hundreds of loyalists, many wearing paramilitary uniforms and some wearing masks, parading in a show of strength to Ballymena Town Hall, where they met DUP leader Ian Paisley. Inside, Robinson told the gathering:

Our first aim will be to bring down the Anglo-Irish Agreement. But that will not be enough. There can never be peace in Ulster until the scourge of the IRA, Gerry Adams, Danny Morrison and their cohorts are put six foot under the ground.

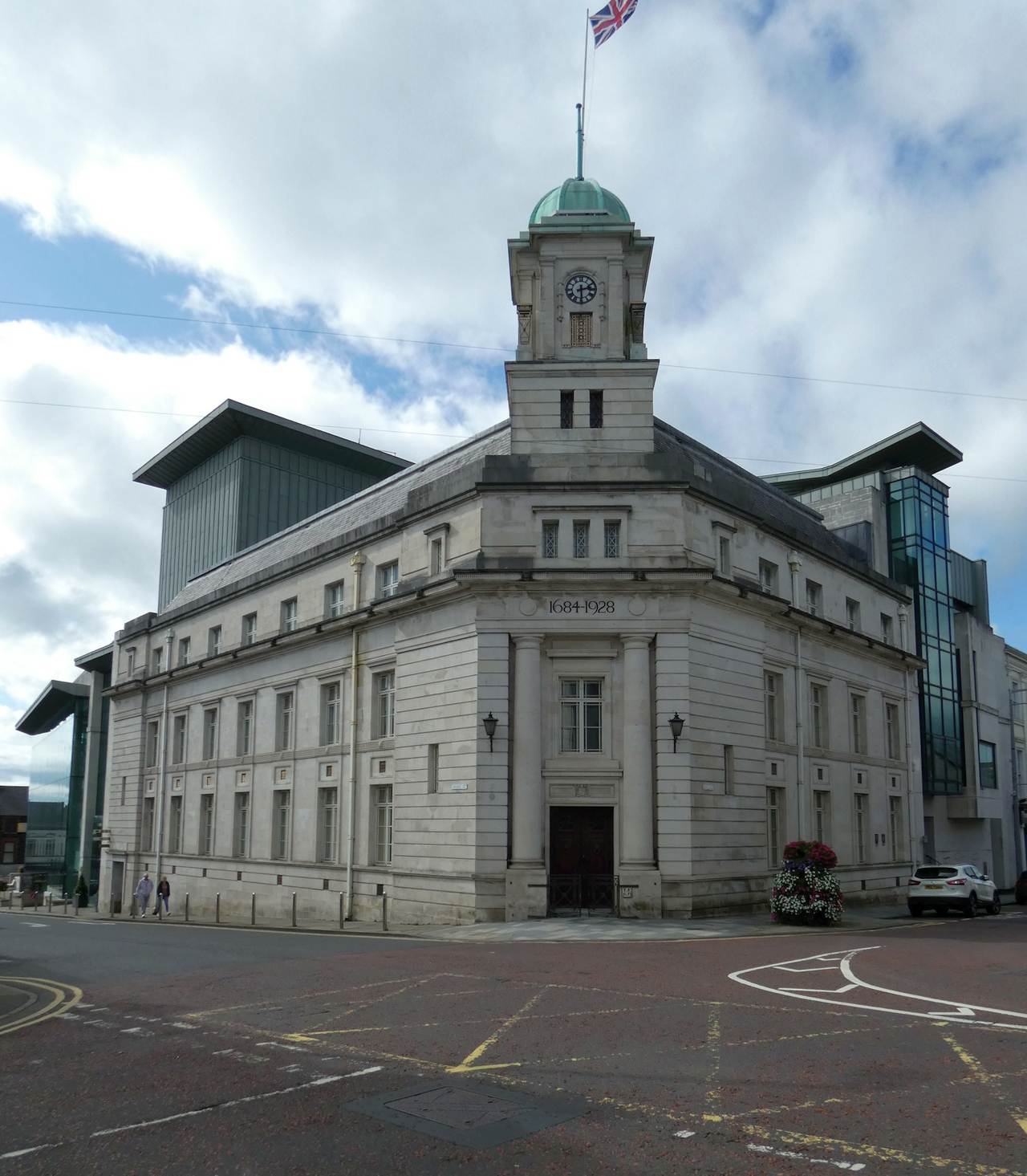
Ballymena town hall

Alan Wright told the Irish Independent his organisation, Ulster Clubs, only joined forces with UR because he was assured that the new organisation was serious about acquiring arms and "was given assurances that they were prepared to go to any lengths" to bring down the Anglo-Irish Agreement and destroy militant Republicanism. Wright asserted that UR would fight the British Army and RUC if the Anglo-Irish Agreement wasn't scrapped and could carry out armed incursions into the Republic of Ireland. Wright also spoke of the necessity of a relationship with the UDA as he believed they were "too big to ignore".

A mass membership failed to materialise, but active groups were established in country areas such as County Armagh, attracting support from rural conservative Protestants. An internal memo presented for the Secretary of State for Northern Ireland in March 1987 reported that UR had carried out further recruiting and the organisation was acquiring more paramilitary uniforms. The report expressed concern that UR, described as a "DUP creation", would be used by the party as "shock troops" at the forefront of action against incoming public order legislation introduced in response to increasingly militant unionist anti-Agreement protests.

After Secretary of State Tom King publicly criticised at length the DUP for their role in creating the new militant group, leading DUP party official Nigel Dodds responded:

Mr King was warned that Loyalists would use democratic parliamentary methods but that if the Government still refused to come to its senses then there would be no alternative but to mobilise the people of Ulster. Mr King has nobody to blame for the formation of the Ulster Resistance but himself.

== Organisation ==
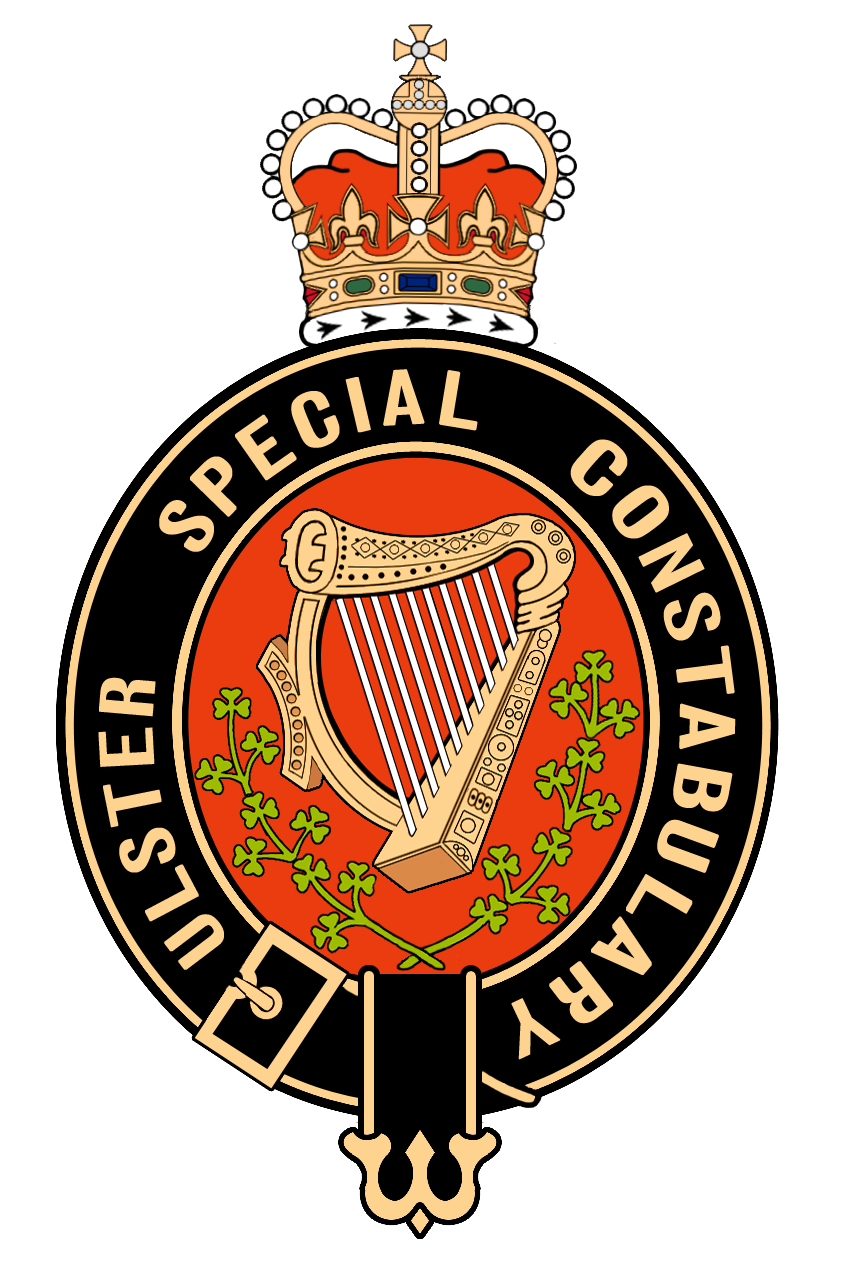
Ulster Special Constabulary badge

It was reported in the press shortly after the founding rally on 10 November that Ulster Resistance was led by DUP party representatives Ian Paisley, Peter Robinson and Ivan Foster and Alan Wright, the chairman of the Ulster Clubs. Below them were nine divisions, based on District Council areas, led by a so-called "Commander". Below them were battalions, companies, and platoons. However, speaking at the closed Ulster Hall event, Peter Robinson stated that he nor other DUP leaders speaking were in fact commanders of the group but knew who were, and were "satisfied" that the military leadership were serious in their intentions. One UR organiser told a journalist that "The military are being placed in submission to the political leadership. It must be kept under the control of elected representatives." Journalist Ed Moloney reported in 1989 that an unidentified DUP figure and DUP activist Noel Little (later arrested on suspicion of arms trafficking) were acting as joint paramilitary leaders of the armed wing upon its founding.

The paramilitary wing was subordinate to the political leadership and was the de facto military wing of the DUP, though it operated outside the party's structures and was open to non-members. The group claimed 12,000 members across Northern Ireland, mostly outside Belfast. Smaller loyalist paramilitary organisations were taken in under the UR umbrella; Ulster Special Constabulary Association whose presence was inspirational rather than practical, Down Orange Welfare, largely inactive, and the Orange Volunteers. Former members of the Ulster Protestant Volunteers also joined UR.

A committee named "Loyalist Family Welfare" was later formed to provide financial assistance for the families of imprisoned Ulster Resistance members. Loyalist Family Welfare adverts seeking donations were regularly published in the Ulster Volunteer Force (UVF) magazine Combat in the early 1990s, with the address provided being in Portadown, County Armagh.

== Arms importation ==
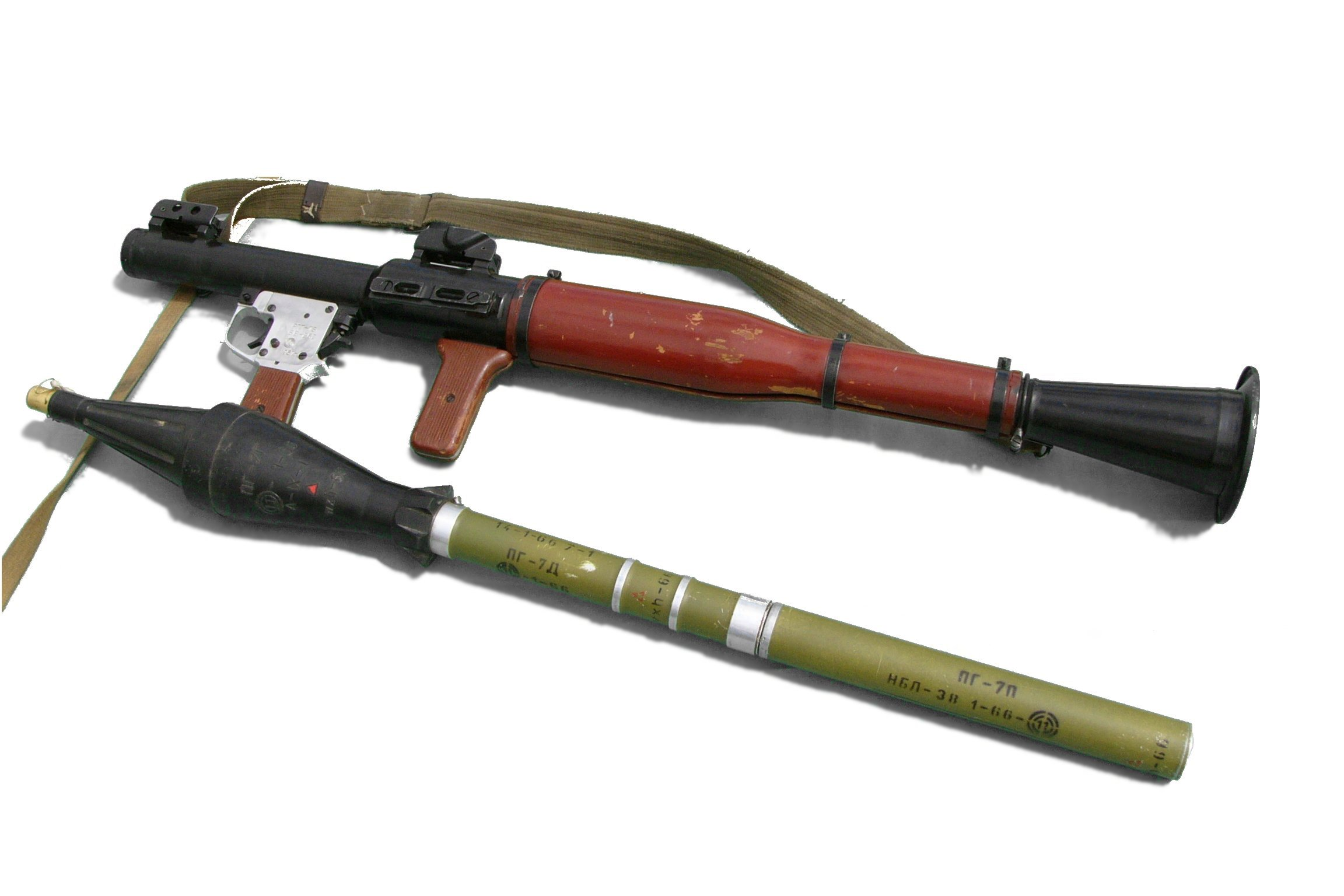
RPG-7 rocket launcher

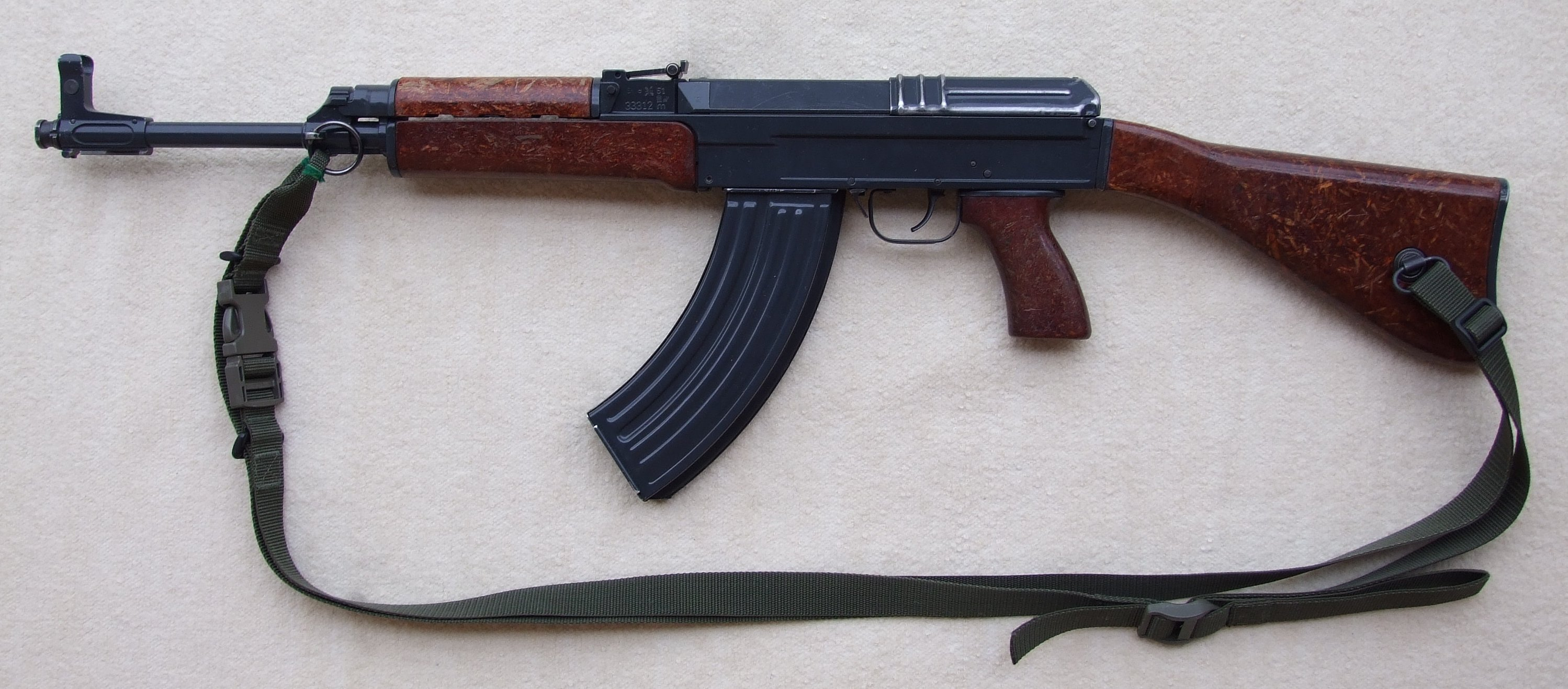
Czech vz. 58 assault rifle

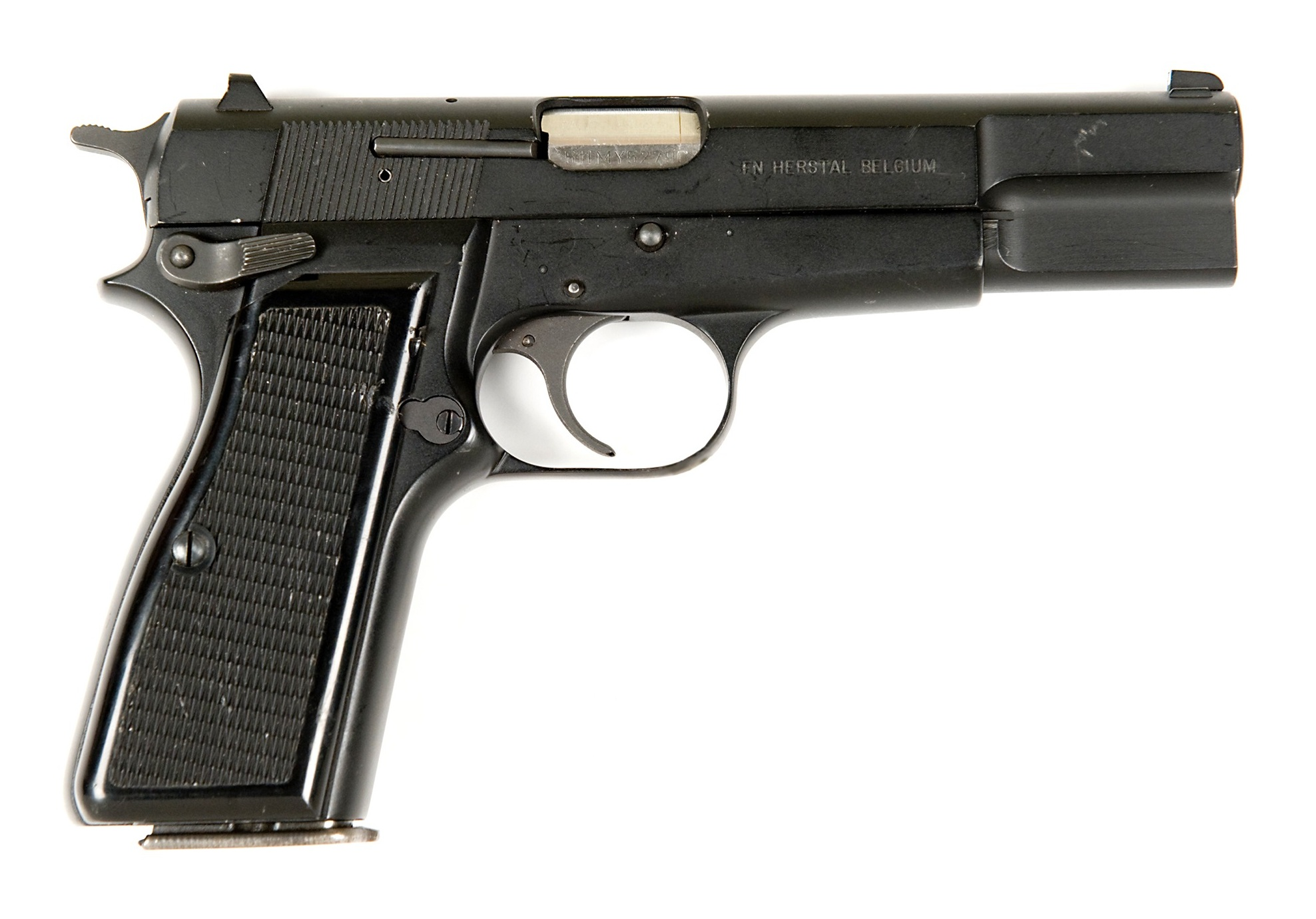
Browning Hi-Power pistol

Ivan Foster at the group's launch claimed that the organisation already had access to a substantial amount of legally-owned firearms.

In December 1986, Ulster Resistance representatives met with other loyalist paramilitary groups to discuss smuggling weapons into Northern Ireland, according to police intelligence. In early 1987 senior UR member Noel Little, using an alias, travelled to Geneva and Paris to meet a representative of South African arms exporter Armscor named Douglas Bernhardt. Little arrived with a "shopping list" of weapons including assault rifles and mortars. At least two DUP members attended a meeting in County Armagh in May 1987 with UR leaders which discussed the possibility of acquiring arms. "They (the DUP members) were told there was a way of getting guns, that a shopping list was possible and that others were ready to help," an anonymous Ulster Resistance member later alleged. The group collaborated with the UVF and the UDA to procure arms. In June 1987 the UVF stole more than £300,000 from the Northern Bank in Portadown. The money was transferred to Swiss and other banks accounts in Europe via suitcases carried by "respectable" members of the Unionist community involved in banking business, and insurance. The money was used to buy 206 Vz. 58 assault rifles, 94 Browning 9mm pistols, 4 RPG-7 rocket launchers and 62 warheads, 450 RGD-5 grenades and 30,000 rounds of ammunition which arrived at Belfast docks from Lebanon in December 1987. The weapons were then transported to a farm between Armagh and Portadown, to await collection by the three groups.

On 8 January 1988, as they attempted to transport their share of the weapons from Portadown to Belfast in a convoy of three cars, the UDA's share was intercepted at a Royal Ulster Constabulary checkpoint. 61 assault rifles, 30 Brownings, 150 grenades and over 11,000 rounds of ammunition were seized and three UDA men arrested. Davy Payne, the UDA's North Belfast Brigadier was sentenced to 19 years in prison and the two others to 14 years each. The presiding judge, Justice Nicholson, appealed to the Protestant community to reject the UDA because they distracted the RUC from "dealing with terrorists in the shape of the PIRA and INLA." One of the convicted men, James McCullough, in response jumped up in the dock and shouted "Long live Ulster – you are a traitor." Noel Little, an Ulster Resistance member and former Ulster Defence Regiment (UDR) soldier who was also the Armagh chairman of the Ulster Clubs, was arrested in connection with the find under the Prevention of Terrorism Act but released without charge.

Part of the UVF's share was among weapons recovered in February 1988. An RPG-7 rocket launcher with 26 warheads, 38 assault rifles, 15 Brownings, 100 grenades and 40,000 rounds of ammunition were found following searches in the Upper Crumlin Road area of North Belfast.

In November 1988, part of the Ulster Resistance share of the weapons was uncovered in police searches at a number of locations in County Armagh around Markethill, Hamiltonsbawn and in Armagh town. Among the items recovered was a RPG-7 rocket launcher and 5 warheads, 5 assault rifles (one being a Kalashnikov-type rifle rather than a Czech vz. 58), a Browning pistol, 10 grenades, 12,000 rounds of ammunition and combat equipment. Also discovered in the arms caches were parts of a Javelin surface-to-air missile, several paramilitary uniforms and a number of UR red berets. Secretary of State for Northern Ireland Tom King speculated that the weapons could have been intended for loyalist attacks in the Republic of Ireland. This suggestion was reinforced by the discovery of a map of County Monaghan. One of the men convicted of arms possession in connection with the find was Mervyn Spratt, a long-serving DUP member from Markethill who had contested a council seat on three occasions. The DUP claimed that it had severed its links with Ulster Resistance in 1987. Ian Paisley stated in the House of Commons the that he knew Mervyn Spratt "very well" but denied the charges demonstrated the arms dump belonged to Ulster Resistance, or that Spratt was even connected to the weapons. When asked about the arms find, Sammy Wilson denied it was linked to UR but told the Sunday Tribune that he "[defended] the right of Unionist people to resist" and "Ulster Resistance are doing no more and no less than Lord Edward Carson." Despite the DUP claiming to have cut ties in 1987, Wilson declined to say when he had last been in contact with Ulster Resistance.

In September 1989, a 33-year-old man from Poyntzpass and a 35-year-old man from Tandragee were jailed to nine and six years respectively for storing and moving weapons and explosives on behalf of UR. In January 1990, a 32-year-old former member of the UDR from Richill was jailed for 12 years for possessing UR arms and explosives.

The weapons jointly imported by Ulster Resistance and the two main loyalist paramilitary organisations were linked to over 70 murders, including the, Sean Graham bookmaker's massacre, Greysteel massacre and the Loughinisland massacre. Ulster Resistance's portion of the South African arms shipment was linked to numerous attacks by loyalist paramilitaries; already in 1988 a Browning pistol and grenades sourced from UR were used by loyalist Michael Stone in the Milltown Cemetery attack. In the 1990s Willie Frazer, a "key figure" in the organisation, distributed assault rifles and rocket launchers from UR to the UDA.

== South African missile plot ==
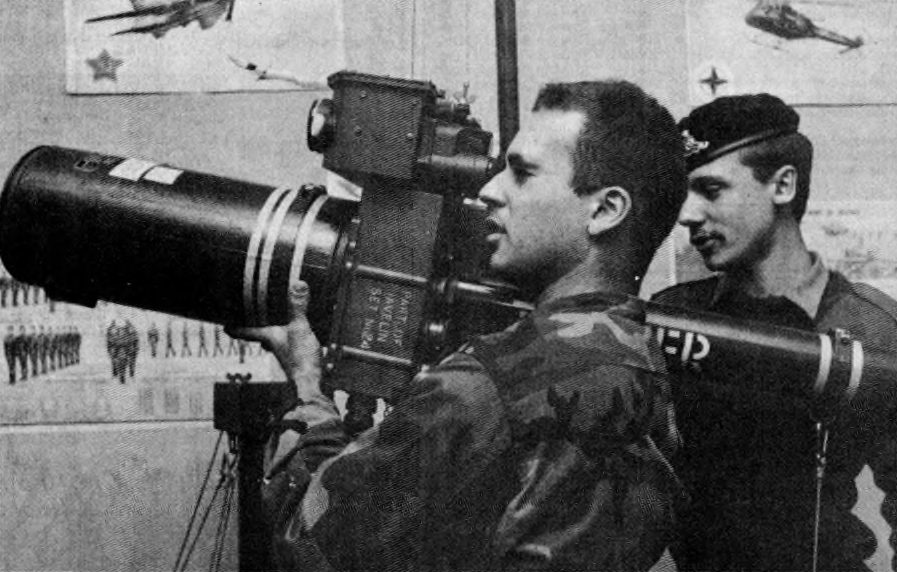
Javelin surface-to-air missile simulator

The contacts in apartheid South Africa who had helped set up the 1987 arms deal were also interested in trading guns for missile technology. On 31 October 1988, a model of the Javelin missile aiming system was stolen by two armed men from the Short Brothers factory in Belfast, which had a mostly unionist workforce. It was theorised that Ulster Resistance penetration into Shorts came through links to a loyalist group, the "People's Loyalist Council", which was involved in intimidation of Catholic workers in Shorts in the aftermath of the Anglo-Irish Agreement. On 23 April 1988 an employee of Shorts had a briefcase stolen from his car while it was parked outside his home in Bangor, County Down. The briefcase contained documents pertaining to the development of the Javelin missile. A training model of an older Blowpipe missile was stolen from a Territorial Army base in Newtownards in April 1989.

Three members of Ulster Resistance—Noel Little, a former UDR soldier, senior member of the Ulster Clubs, and DUP activist previously arrested in connection with the 1987 importation of arms, James King, a Free Presbyterian and DUP activist from Killyleagh, County Down and Samuel Quinn, a sergeant in the Territorial Army from Newtownards—were arrested at the Hilton Hotel, Paris on 21 April 1989. Parts of the stolen Blowpipe training demonstrator were recovered during the arrests while others were later found in Ballywalter, County Down. Three of Quinn's colleagues were expelled from the Territorial Army in the aftermath of the missile theft; one, Corporal James Shannon, was a leading DUP councillor and was later elected as Member of Parliament (MP) for Strangford. Shannon was a founder member of UR and also a member of the Ulster Clubs. Shannon came to the attention of military authorities after the arrest in February 1989 of another soldier at the Newtownards base, Alan McGrath, who was charged with possession of firearms and explosives at his home. Also arrested were a diplomat from South Africa, Daniel Storm, and an American arms dealer, Douglas Bernhart, leading to claims that the unionists were attempting to procure arms in return for missile technology from Short Brothers. The "Paris Three" were charged with arms trafficking and associating with criminals involved in terrorist activities. They were convicted in October 1991 after more than two years on remand. They received suspended sentences and fines ranging from £2,000 to £5,000. Following the arrests, the SDLP called for Ulster Resistance to be made a proscribed organisation under British law and for RUC Special Branch to question DUP politicians about the organisation. Two weeks after the arrests DUP leader Ian Paisley announced his intention to visit the men in prison, claiming "the press had already tried these men and found them guilty and hung them high". DUP deputy leader Peter Robinson campaigned on behalf of the 'Paris Three' while Paisley sent them copies of the Bible. King said in an interview that the Three's defence was partly funded by donations from the Orange Order, Apprentice Boys, and Royal Black Institution. A fund set up by the DUP also assisted.

In early August 1989 former SDLP politician Austin Currie wrote to Irish Minister for Justice Gerry Collins alleging that two named serving members of the UDR in Fermanagh had been seen putting up posters reading, "Support the Paris Three and join Ulster Resistance", which were widely distributed across parts of Tyrone and Fermanagh.

== Paramilitary activity ==
According to Martin Dillon, Ulster Resistance cooperated with the Ulster Freedom Fighters (UFF), the cover name for the group within the UDA responsible for paramilitary attacks. In Stone Cold Dillon alleges that UR members provided intelligence on potential targets in rural areas and also safehouses for loyalist hit squads. The UDA had already trained some UR members in the usage of firearms. In 1987, a UR unit based in County Fermanagh and County Tyrone informed the UDA they had the identity of an IRA intelligence officer, Dermot Hackett. In reality Hackett was an innocent Catholic who had no connection to the IRA or Sinn Féin but had been subject to intense harassment and intimidation from members of the RUC and Ulster Defence Regiment (UDR) and feared he was becoming the victim of a revenge campaign in response to the killing of a UDR soldier in Tyrone earlier that year. The harassment subsided after an intervention by Social Democratic and Labour Party (SDLP) politician Denis Haughey but Dillon believed there was "no doubt" that the UDR's focus on Hackett brought him to the attention of UR, because of the "natural collusion" between members of the UDR and loyalist paramilitaries.

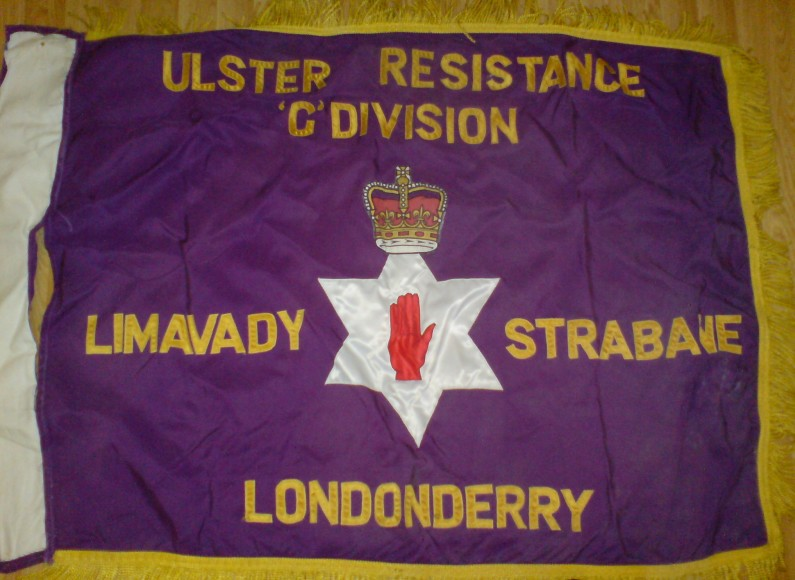
Ulster Resistance Flag 'C' Division, bearing the Red Hand of Ulster

On 22 May 1987, the IRA murdered Charles Watson, a former UDR soldier and UR member (UVF member according to the Sutton Index of Deaths). The following day UFF gunman Michael Stone met with members of UR in Enniskillen, where he was then taken to a safehouse. They briefed him about Hackett's whereabouts and Stone was then transported to another safehouse in Omagh where he met two other members of the organisation who showed him a security file. The British security forces file had numerous photographs of Hackett, some of which allegedly showed him in the company of IRA members; Hackett's charity work with Society of Saint Vincent de Paul brought him into contact with many people and the paucity of evidence in the file supported the view that Hackett was a victim of spurious accusations, according to Dillon. Hackett was shot dead while driving his bread van near Drumquin, County Tyrone. Afterwards Stone was driven back to the Enniskillen safehouse. The UFF later claimed responsibility for the murder. However, Stone later claimed in his autobiography None Shall Divide Us that he had been selected to carry out the murder, but withdrew after being informed that British security forces had been informed of the operation in advance to secure the area and ensure an escape route. Stone alleged that two younger, local UDA/UFF members actually carried out the shooting. The Bishop of Derry Edward Daly afterwards said targeted harassment by the RUC "left Catholics open to attack" from "psychopathic" Protestant extremists. The following day in a further act of retaliation, an RUC officer who had just attended Charles Watson's wake fired several shots into a restaurant in Castlewellan, County Down, with a Third Force armband on his person.

Ulster Resistance members were also allegedly involved in the attempted assassination of Sinn Féin councillor John Davey near his home in Gulladuff, County Londonderry in February 1988. Loyalist paramilitaries succeeded in killing Davey at his home the following year; the UVF claimed responsibility. UR members reportedly assisted the UVF Mid-Ulster Brigade in a series of attacks in the late 1980s and early 1990s that marked an escalation of violence in County Tyrone and north County Armagh, although it was also alleged the UR name had become little more than a cover for the UVF.

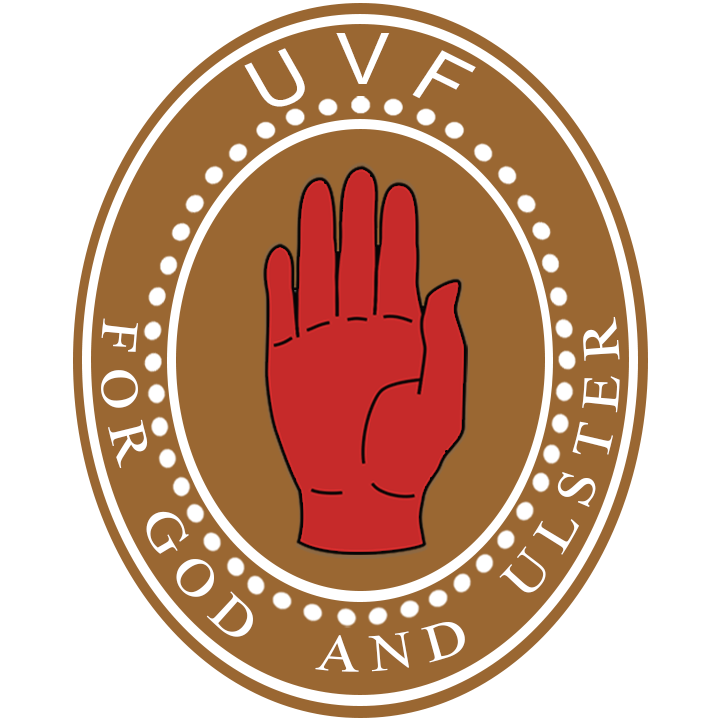
UVF emblem

The Irish News reported in 1996 that British security forces believed that Ulster Resistance "continued to act as a quartermaster" by organising an "arms pool" for loyalist paramilitaries, already in March 1988 Ulster Resistance supplied the grenades and handgun for the Milltown Cemetery massacre. According to UFF gunman Michael Stone, who carried out the attack, he met first a contact in Coleraine, County Londonderry, days prior. From Coleraine, Stone was driven for two hours in a three-car convoy to the sprawling farmhouse of a leading figure in UR. The UR representative gave Stone free access to a large arms cache consisting of pistols, revolvers, rifles and hand grenades and told him to "use it well". Stone was then driven to a loyalist safehouse by his Coleraine contact, and from there Stone was transported to Belfast with his weaponry by an off-duty RUC officer who used his police warrant card to bypass security forces checkpoints. According to Dillon, the arms were given to Stone on the orders of UDA intelligence chief Brian Nelson, who was later revealed to be an agent of the Force Research Unit (FRU), a covert British military intelligence unit.

In the 1990s Willie Frazer, a former UDR soldier and "key figure" in the organisation living in Markethill, distributed assault rifles and rocket launchers from UR to the UDA. In the early 1990s Johnny Adair leader of the UDA's "C Company", 2nd Battalion Shankill Road, West Belfast Brigade made contact with Frazer through mid-Ulster based loyalists. The UDA's share of the South African shipment had been lost in 1988 but in 1991 the UDA's "C Company" had acquired its first assault rifle, likely via Markethill-based UR members and by 1993 UR had supplied the Adair with several weapons, including assault rifles. In September 1993 Adair (not knowing he was being recorded) admitted to an RUC officer that he had purchased RPG-7 rocket launchers from UR on the condition they not be used against loyalists or British security forces; in 1994 the UDA carried out a number of rocket attacks on pubs in republican areas of Belfast and against Sinn Féin's headquarters. Adair later described the Ulster Resistance arms as 'a Godsend'.

At a series of meetings near Markethill between representatives of the UDA's "C Company" and Ulster Resistance, Adair outlined a strategy for launching attacks on "specific republican targets" in South Armagh, a notorious republican stronghold where even the British Army travelled nearly exclusively by helicopter. The UDA would provide the gunmen while UR would handle intelligence and logistics; driving assassination teams to their targets, providing safe houses from which to mount attacks and disposing of weapons afterwards. The Ulster Resistance leaders present found the plan "sufficiently appealing" for them to give it further consideration. A list of targets was discussed, including Thomas "Slab" Murphy the leader of the IRA in South Armagh and member of the IRA Army Council, the executive body of the organisation. Ultimately the plan was dropped because local loyalists feared retaliation from the Provisional IRA.

In August 1996 Sunday Life reported that loyalist sources believed the newly emerging Loyalist Volunteer Force (LVF) was joining forces with UR. Dillon wrote in 1997 that UR "remains an armed grouping, waiting in the wings for the call to violence" and "it shares views expressed by men like Billy Wright" that a civil war may be necessary to defend the position of Ulster Protestants. Dillon claimed that among the organisation's leaders were influential businessmen, serving RUC officers and former UDR soldiers. The organisation was highlighted again when grenades found in a dilapidated Gospel hall in north Belfast were linked to an UR arms shipment from South Africa. In July 1998 following a series of arson attacks on Catholic churches it was again reported that LVF members were "connected" with UR. The Irish Independent wrote in July 1998 that "Ulster Resistance and Third Force have been reactivated".

UR was reported to have supplied hand grenades to the Orange Volunteers (a separate organisation from the original Orange Volunteers) and the Red Hand Defenders, a covername for mainstream loyalists carrying out attacks contrary to their public ceasefires. Both groups carried out numerous grenade and pipe bomb attacks against Catholics in Northern Ireland in the years following the signing of the 1998 Good Friday Agreement.

In July 2000, UDA leader Johnny Adair reportedly travelled twice to Markethill to meet with a businessman connected to Ulster Resistance to purchase weaponry to arm a new dissident loyalist faction drawing its membership from the LVF and his Shankill-based UDA supporters. The UR representative reportedly told Adair the arms were not for sale at that time.

== Aftermath ==
In the late 1980s some former members broke away naming themselves Resistance. It is believed to have joined the Combined Loyalist Military Command (CLMC), although it has long since faded. In April 1991 after the CLMC announced its existence and an immediate, time-limited ceasefire The Irish Press reported that the CLMC consisted of five paramilitary leaders representing the UFF, UVF, Red Hand Commando and a group known as Resistance. Later, when the ceasefire ended in July, the paper listed Ulster Resistance as one of the groups making up the CLMC.

In February 2004 a group calling itself "Ulster Resistance 'A' Company (Ballymena)" threatened landlords in Ballymena who failed to evict known drug dealers. The warning followed a hoax bomb planted at the home of a man who had recently appeared in court on a drugs charge.

In a front-page article on 10 June 2007, the Sunday Life reported that Ulster Resistance were still active and armed. A statement released by the group claimed that it had "the capability and resources to strike with deadly force". A photo accompanying the article showed two masked men posing with automatic rifles beside a banner which read "Ulster Resistance C Division". A spokesman purporting to represent the organisation claimed it had the "capability and resources to strike with deadly force" and also that the group had members in Armagh, Fermanagh, south Londonderry and Tyrone and "a presence" in Belfast.

In June 2017, following the United Kingdom general election, the DUP's historic links with Ulster Resistance were discussed in the media in relation to the Conservative–DUP agreement. Emma Little-Pengelly, daughter of Noel Little of the "Paris Three", was elected MP for Belfast South in that election. When the DUP were asked to condemn Ulster Resistance in 2016 they stated "the party's stance is consistent, that anyone involved in illegal activity should be investigated and face the full weight of the law."

In August 2017 Peter Robinson, represented by defamation lawyer Paul Tweed, secured an apology, retraction and undisclosed damages from the Metro newspaper for an article alleging he had been a member of Ulster Resistance.

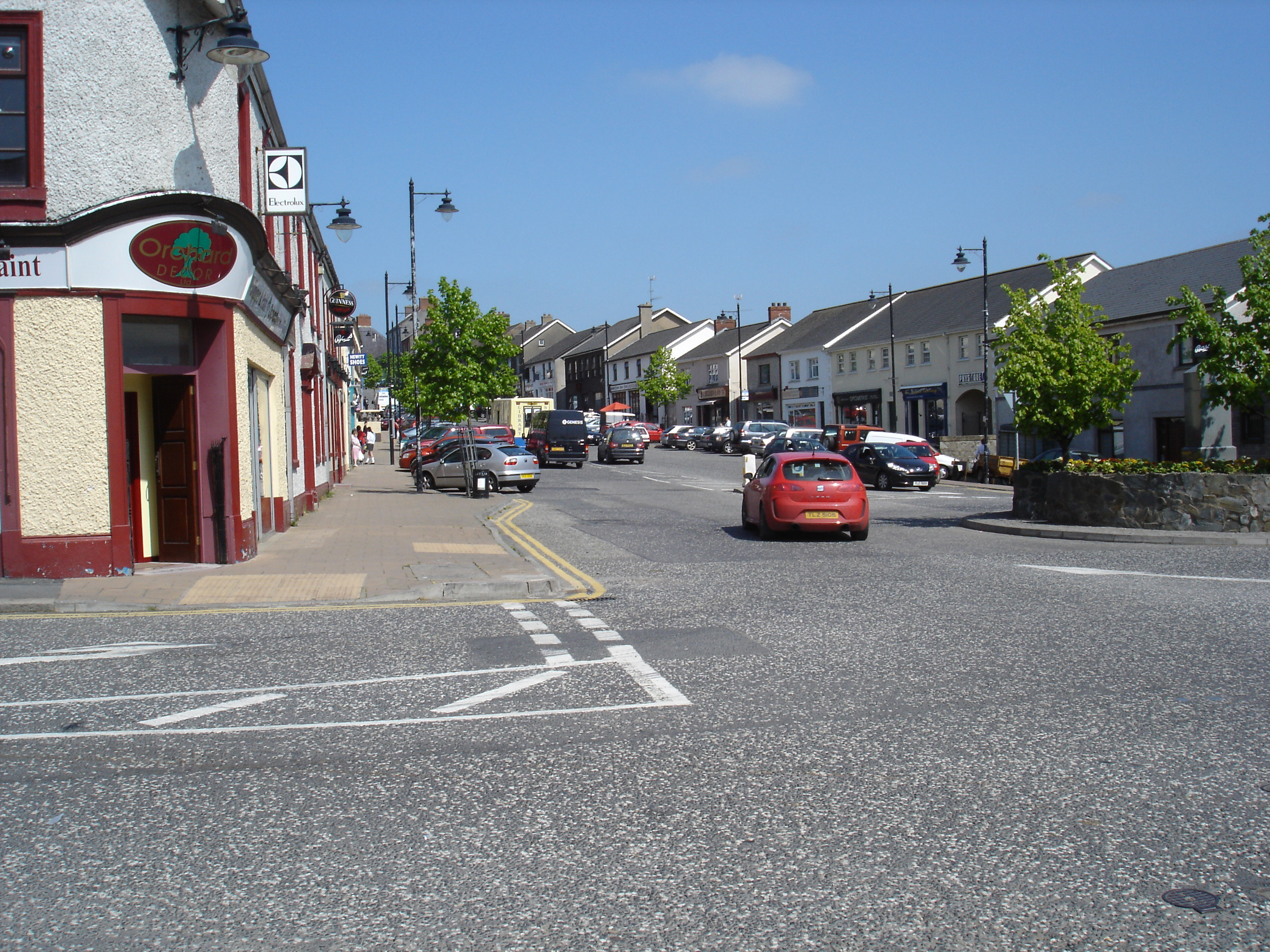
Markethill, County Armagh

In August 2022 the Sunday World newspaper reported that "hard-line" loyalists opposed to the Good Friday Agreement had planned to assassinate Ulster Unionist Party leader David Trimble using Ulster Resistance arms. According to loyalist Barrie Halliday, his friend Willie Frazer had led a delegation of militant loyalists to David Trimble's home (uninvited) to pressure him to abandon plans to create a power-sharing administration for Northern Ireland. The border-based unionists left after a heated argument; days later a plan to murder Trimble materialised. The plot involved "hand-picked" members of various loyalist paramilitary groupings attacking Trimble's car with an Ulster Resistance-sourced RPG-7 rocket launcher as he exited onto the Belfast motorway from Lisburn. A Czech vz. 58 assault rifle and RGD-5 grenades were to be used to cover their escape. According to Halliday, the plan was foiled by Frazer, who emptied the arms cache.

Unlike the UVF and UDA, Ulster Resistance never decommissioned its arsenal of weapons. Interviewed in 2012, Noel Little stated that, to his knowledge, the remaining UR arsenal was intact and in storage. According to a 2026 report, loyalists based in Mid-Ulster were still maintaining the weapons, and reportedly claimed that they are being stockpiled for use in a ‘doomsday’ scenario should the British and Irish governments ever attempt to “bounce” Ulster Protestants into a United Ireland.

== Deaths as a result of activity ==
The weapons jointly imported by Ulster Resistance and the two main loyalist paramilitary organisations were linked to over 70 murders, including the Greysteel massacre and the Loughinisland massacre. Ulster Resistance's portion of the South African arms shipment was linked to numerous attacks by loyalist paramilitaries; already in 1988 a Browning pistol and grenades sourced from UR were used by loyalist Michael Stone in the Milltown Cemetery attack. In the 1990s UR distributed assault rifles and rocket launchers to the UDA explicitly to be used in "C Company's" ongoing campaign of violence against known republicans and innocent Catholics. According to Dillon, UR was directly involved in the murder of Catholic charity worker Dermot Hackett in County Tyrone in 1986.

The Sutton Index of Deaths states that Robert Metcalfe, the 40-year-old owner of an army surplus store in Lurgan shot dead by the Provisional IRA at his home in Magheralin, County Down, in October 1989, was a member of Ulster Resistance. Author Steve Bruce also claims that Metcalfe was "purportedly active in the UVF". In 1998 the Sunday Independent alleged that Metcalfe was a former member of the infamous UVF unit led by Robin Jackson and Jackson had cried openly at his funeral. The killing of the UR/UVF member spurred a wave of revenge attacks by the Mid-Ulster UVF. Dillon claims that Charles Watson, a former UDR soldier murdered by the IRA in 1986 was a member of Ulster Resistance while according to Sutton he was a member of the UVF. The Irish National Liberation Army (INLA) alleged that Thomas Douglas, a Protestant man they shot dead outside his Belfast workplace in May 1994, was a member of Ulster Resistance but this was strenuously denied by both his family and the RUC. Sutton lists Douglas as a civilian.
