= Ulster Loyalist Central Co-ordinating Committee =

Northern Irish loyalist organisation

The Ulster Loyalist Central Co-ordinating Committee (ULCCC) was set up in 1974 in Belfast, Northern Ireland in the aftermath of the Ulster Workers Council Strike, to facilitate meetings and policy coordination between the Ulster Workers Council, loyalist paramilitary groups, and the political representatives of Ulster loyalism.

== Original version ==
Seen as an important link between grassroots loyalism and more mainstream unionist politics, the ULCCC was chaired by Glenn Barr and met in the Belfast offices of the Vanguard Progressive Unionist Party on a weekly basis. Replacing the earlier Ulster Army Council, it brought together representatives of the Ulster Defence Association (UDA), Ulster Volunteer Force (UVF), Red Hand Commando, Vanguard Service Corps/Ulster Volunteer Service Corps, Down Orange Welfare (DOW), Loyalist Association of Workers and Orange Volunteers. Barr was soon replaced as chairman by John McKeague and the ULCCC took on the wider aim of preparing for the establishment of a unified "Ulster army" in the event of a British withdrawal from Northern Ireland, something that had become a leading fear in unionism in the mid-1970s.

Both Barr and McKeague were prominent supporters of Ulster nationalism and in McKeague's capacity of ULCCC chairman he spoke publicly in support of independence, despite the fact that such an idea had little support outside sections of the UDA. Somewhat ironically it was the UDA, along with DOW, that left the ULCCC in 1976 after it emerged that McKeague and other members of the groups were unilaterally holding meetings with members of the Provisional IRA and also discussing plans for an independent Northern Ireland with leading Catholic figures. With the departure of the largest loyalist paramilitary group, the ULCCC went into abeyance.

== Refounded version ==
The ULCCC was revived in 1991 under the leadership of Ray Smallwoods (the leader of the Ulster Democratic Party who was killed by the Provisional IRA in July 1994), although it did not gain much importance due to the existence by that time of the Combined Loyalist Military Command, which brought together the leaderships of the UDA, RHC and UVF.

== "The Committee" ==
The revived ULCCC was at the centre of controversy when Sean McPhilemy alleged that its members included Ulster Bank chief Billy Abernethy, Ulster Independence Movement leader Reverend Hugh Ross, Royal Ulster Constabulary Assistant Chief Constable Trevor Forbes and other leading people in Northern Irish society who, he claimed, conspired with leading paramilitary figures such as Billy Wright and Robin Jackson to facilitate loyalist killings.

The full list of alleged members as claimed by McPhilemy in his book was as follows:

Name	Position or job	Notes
Billy Abernethy	Ulster Bank executive	ULCCC chairman
Hugh Ross	Ulster Independence Movement leader	
Trevor Forbes OBE	Royal Ulster Constabulary Assistant Chief Constable	
James Sands	Ulster Independence Movement member	McPhilemy's main source of information
John McCullagh	Ulster Resistance representative	
Isobel McCulloch	ULCCC secretary	
Graham Long	Loyalist paramilitary	Previously British Army
Nelson McCausland	Member of Belfast City Council	Subsequently Minister of Culture, Arts and Leisure
David Prentice	Co-owner of car business	Successfully sued McPhilemy (see below)
Albert Prentice	Co-owner of car business	Successfully sued McPhilemy (see below)
Cecil Kilpatrick	Ulster Independence Movement member	
Lewis Singleton	Ulster Independence Movement member and solicitor	
Sammy Abraham	Businessman	
Will Davidson	Inner Force representative	
Alec Jamison	Inner Force representative	
Robin Jackson	Ulster Volunteer Force brigadier	
Billy Wright	Ulster Volunteer Force brigadier	
Dean McCullough	Ulster Volunteer Force member	
Alec Benson	Loyalist Retaliation and Defence Group member	Lisburn-based arm of the UVF
Ken Kerr	Ulster Defence Association brigadier	Source of evidence for McPhilemy
Ian Whittle	Inner Force representative	

The make-up of the group was largely based on evidence provided to McPhilemy by James Sands. An alternative composition of the Committee was provided by Ken Kerr although McPhilemy later determined his evidence to be fraudulent and dismissed it. Of those named by McPhilemy only Sands and Kerr acknowledged the existence of this version of the ULCCC.

The Inner Force referred to in the table was a supposed secret group within the Royal Ulster Constabulary that existed, under the command of Trevor Forbes, to manage police collusion in loyalist paramilitary killings. The existence of the Inner Force has also been strenuously denied by those named as having been involved. David and Albert Prentice subsequently sued McPhilemy, his publisher Roberts Rinehart and his TV production company Box Production for $100 million over his claims that they were involved in the ULCCC. McPhilemy settled out of court for $1 million and released a statement acknowledging that the Prenitces had no involvement in the activity described in the book. In a separate case McPhilemy was awarded £145,000 in damages against The Sunday Times after the paper claimed that The Committee was a hoax.

== Bibliography ==
- H. McDonald & J. Cusack, UDA – Inside the Heart of Loyalist Terror, Dublin, Penguin Ireland, 2004
