= Ulster Volunteer Service Corps =

Loyalist vigilante and paramilitary movement

The Ulster Volunteer Service Corps (UVSC) was an Ulster loyalist vigilante and paramilitary movement active in Northern Ireland during the early 1970s. Initially the steward group for the Ulster Vanguard (later the Vanguard Unionist Progressive Party), under the title Vanguard Service Corps, it continued to exist after becoming independent of that movement.

== History ==
The group was established as the paramilitary wing of the Ulster Vanguard in 1972, and wore a military-style uniform. Its main role was to provide protection for Vanguard members whilst they were making speeches. Some members of the group were also known to be members of the Ulster Defence Regiment. Their presence was described as giving a "Mosleyite quality" to the Vanguard. According to loyalist activist Sam McClure, Service Corps membership was accompanied with a solemn swearing-in ceremony although David Trimble, a Vanguard activist, dismissed this claim as "utter balls".

They were under the leadership of the overall Vanguard Command and were officially discouraged from involvement in violence and lawlessness. Nevertheless, they were infiltrated by a number of Ulster Volunteer Force (UVF) members from their inception. According to RUC Special Branch reports, they had begun as a group of militants within the Vanguard movement who initially styled themselves the Vanguard Volunteers before formalising as the Vanguard Service Corps.

They adopted the name Ulster Volunteer Service Corps in 1973 after the establishment of the Vanguard Unionist Progressive Party. The group was led by Hugh Petrie, who was also a leading figure in the Loyalist Association of Workers. Petrie represented the UVSC on the Ulster Army Council following the establishment of that group in 1973 in the run-up to the Ulster Workers' Council strike.

During the strike itself, the UVSC was part of a faction of minor loyalist paramilitary groups, also including the Orange Volunteers, Ulster Special Constabulary Association, and Down Orange Welfare, who pushed for Bill Craig to take a leading role in the running of the strike. The larger Ulster Defence Association and UVF had hoped to exclude politicians from the conduct of the strike as much as possible but ultimately acquiesced and allowed both Craig and Ian Paisley to play prominent public roles in the stoppage.

Following the strike, the group helped to form the Ulster Loyalist Central Co-ordinating Committee, which replaced the Ulster Army Council in 1974. Royal Ulster Constabulary reports at the time state that the UVSC fell apart in 1974, presumably after the strike.
