= United Ulster Unionist Council =

The United Ulster Unionist Council (also known as the United Ulster Unionist Coalition) was a body that sought to bring together the Unionists opposed to the Sunningdale Agreement in Northern Ireland.

== Formation ==
The UUUC was established in January 1974. It was organised by Harry West and constituted a formal electoral pact between his Ulster Unionist Party, the Democratic Unionist Party and the Vanguard Unionist Progressive Party. West arranged the movement, having gained control of the UUP from Brian Faulkner, to galvanise opposition to power sharing arrangements that were being put in place and to run against Faulkner's Pro-Assembly Unionists who later formed themselves into the Unionist Party of Northern Ireland.

== Development ==
The UUUC first tested its political credentials in the 1974 general election and the party captured 11 out of 12 Northern Irish seats (7 UUP, 3 VUPP, 1 DUP), whilst the Pro-Assembly Unionists failed to win any seats. In April the group arranged a coalition conference at Portrush during which they agreed a joint policy statement that included an end to power-sharing, elections to a new Assembly that would use proportional representation but with smaller constituencies, the abolition of the Council of Ireland and any concept of cross-border institutions and the removal of the veto held by the Secretary of State for Northern Ireland.

In the general election of October that same year the UUUC lost West's seat, Fermanagh and South Tyrone, to Frank Maguire, an independent Republican running as an agreed candidate, leaving them with 10 overall. At Westminster the coalition operated under the name of Unionist Parliamentary Coalition with West accepted as leader until his elimination from parliament when Jim Molyneaux took over as coalition chief.

The UUUC remained fairly coherent as it united behind the Ulster Workers Council Strike in mid 1974 and continued for 1975 elections to the Constitutional Convention in which the group won 46 out of the 78 seats.

== Decline ==
The UUUC began to fall apart in 1976 when VUPP leader William Craig suggested working in a potential coalition government with the nationalist Social Democratic and Labour Party. When it became clear that Craig's ideas were not in keeping with those of his partners, Vanguard split with his opponents setting up the United Ulster Unionist Party (UUUP) while Craig's supporters stayed with Vanguard which left the UUUC. The UUUC thereafter consisted of the UUP, DUP and UUUP.

The UUUC set up the United Unionist Action Council (UUAC) in 1977 a policy group and an activism co-ordinating committee. Chaired by Joseph Burns and featuring DUP leader Ian Paisley and UUUP leader Ernest Baird, the group included representatives from loyalist paramilitary groups the Ulster Defence Association, Down Orange Welfare and the Orange Volunteers and also organised its own vigilante group under the name Ulster Service Corps. The UUAC helped organise the May 1977 strike by the Ulster Workers Council, that sought to repeat the effects of 1974. However the second strike proved much less effective and did not get the backing of the Ulster Unionists, who in fact campaigned against it. The strike proved the final straw for the UUUC with the UUP, DUP and UUUP going their separate ways after it collapsed.

== Members ==
Name	Organisation
John Alexander	Independent Orange Order
William Annon	Apprentice Boys of Derry
William Beattie	Democratic Unionist Party
Peter Brush	Down Orange Welfare
Jackie Campbell	Orange Volunteers
Cyril Glass	Royal Black Preceptory
Douglas Hutchinson	Democratic Unionist Party
Billy Kelly	Ulster Workers Council
Jim McClure	Democratic Unionist Party
Sammy McCormick	Ulster Defence Association
William McCree	Democratic Unionist Party
Nassa Mercer	Down Orange Welfare
George Morrison	United Ulster Unionist Party
Robert Overend	United Ulster Unionist Party
Bob Pagles	Loyalist Association of Workers
Peter Robinson	Democratic Unionist Party
Jim Smyth	Ulster Workers Council
Andy Tyrie	Ulster Defence Association
William Wright	United Ulster Unionist Party
