= Ulster Workers' Council =

Loyalist workers' organisation in Northern Ireland

The Ulster Workers' Council was a loyalist workers' organisation set up in Northern Ireland in 1974 as a more formalised successor to the Loyalist Association of Workers (LAW). It was formed by shipyard union leader Harry Murray and initially failed to gain much attention. However, with the full support of the Ulster Defence Association (UDA) the UWC became the main mobilising force for loyalist opposition to power-sharing arrangements.

== Formation ==
The group had been mooted in late 1973 when Harry Murray, a shop steward at Harland & Wolff, and other loyalist trade unionists had met at the Hawthornden Road headquarters of the Vanguard Progressive Unionist Party (VPUP) to discuss setting up a more formal version of the LAW The formation of the group was announced in the April 1974 edition of Ulster Loyalist, a publication of the UDA, with the announcement promising that workers would be central to the political future of Northern Ireland and that these workers were preparing to mobilise against a united Ireland. From the outset most politicians were excluded from these meetings with the exception of VPUP leader William Craig and his party colleague David Trimble.

The Ulster Workers' Council (UWC) name was adopted by February 1974 with the group chaired by Glenn Barr, at the time a member of the Northern Ireland Assembly for the VPUP as well as a brigadier in the UDA. He was joined by the likes of Murray and Billy Kelly and Tom Beattie from Ballylumford power station. These were sometimes joined by Andy Tyrie on behalf of the UDA and Ken Gibson of the Ulster Volunteer Force, as well as representatives of smaller loyalist groups such as the Orange Volunteers and Down Orange Welfare.

== Development ==
Soon after its establishment the UWC established a thirteen-member co-ordinating committee under the chairmanship of Barr. This smaller group met once a fortnight at the VPUP headquarters. The group soon came to the attention of the government, and Secretary of State for Northern Ireland Merlyn Rees held a meeting with its representatives on 8 April 1974. At the meeting the UWC demanded new elections to the Northern Ireland Assembly, which they dismissed as undemocratic. The meeting soon descended into angry scenes, with UWC members making allegations to Rees about the treatment of loyalist prisoners and negotiations with "terrorists" in Dublin, and the meeting ended inconclusively.

The response of the UWC was to threaten a general strike, and pressed ahead for strike plans without the initial knowledge of the Unionist politicians. On 13 May 1974 a large meeting of UWC-affiliated people was held at Portrush at which Billy Kelly, accompanied by Tyrie, UDA member Jim Smyth, and Short Brothers shop steward Hugh Petrie, announced to the assembled audience, which included Ernest Baird, Ian Paisley and John Taylor, that the general strike was to be launched the following day.

== Strike ==
The strike began on 15 May and continued to 29 May. Rather than conceding the new elections that the UWC had initially demanded, the UK Government prorogued the Northern Ireland Assembly the following day. Rees interpreted the strike as Ulster nationalism, as it constituted open defiance of the British government by loyalists, and indeed some leaders, notably Barr, did support long-term Northern Ireland independence. However ultimately the issue did not enter into negotiations with the British government.

== Post-strike ==
The initial response to the strike was jubilation with large bonfires lit across loyalist areas of Northern Ireland, although before long cracks appeared. Publicly the political leaders Paisley, Craig and Harry West were able to claim the glory whilst the shop stewards returned to work anonymously and the paramilitary leaders faded into the background. Nonetheless the loyalist paramilitaries had decided that political activity might still be an avenue worth exploring, with both main groups declaring ceasefires and the UVF announcing the establishment of their own Volunteer Political Party.

The British government took the strike as a sign that a solution could not be imposed, and that the people of Northern Ireland, or their representatives, had to find a solution for themselves. A white paper was published in July outlining plans for a Northern Ireland Constitutional Convention that would provide the Northern Irish with "a crucial part in determining their own future". Meanwhile, the Provisional Irish Republican Army responded to what it saw as the British government's capitulation to the strike by launching a wave of attacks in mainland Britain in an attempt to demonstrate to the British government that they were a greater threat than striking loyalists. The UWC itself rapidly lost cohesion. As early as July 1974 Harry Murray was forced to resign from the UWC, after stating publicly that he would be happy to talk to representatives of the PIRA if they ended their campaign of violence. Murray left loyalism altogether after this and by the following year was a candidate for the cross-community Alliance Party of Northern Ireland in a North Down Borough Council by-election.

== United Unionist Action Council ==
In 1977 a new body, the United Unionist Action Council (UUAC), was established bringing together representatives of the UDA, Down Orange Welfare, the Orange Volunteers and the remnants of the UWC under the chairmanship of Joseph Burns and with the support of Paisley and Baird, who was leading his own United Ulster Unionist Party by this point. A vigilante group called the Ulster Service Corps was organised by this group. In May 1977 this group convinced the UWC to lead a second strike in an attempt to replicate the success of three years earlier. This time however, unlike in 1974, the UUAC did not have obvious demands and the strike did not have the support of the Ulster Unionist Party or the Vanguard and it also failed to convince electricity workers to support it, resulting in only limited disruption to power. Barr announced his public opposition to the strike, Harry West led counter demonstrations urging a return to work and Royal Ulster Constabulary Chief Constable Kenneth Newman, under instruction from new Secretary of State Roy Mason, took an aggressive line smashing through makeshift barricades set up on areas such as the Shankill Road with convoys of new police armoured land rovers. The strike descended into chaos with a series of setbacks, notably UDA gunman Kenny McClinton shooting and killing Protestant bus driver Harry Bradshaw on the Crumlin Road for his refusal to strike, an off-duty Ulster Defence Regiment soldier being killed by a bomb in the same area, UDA members William Hobbs and James McClurg accidentally immolating themselves whilst making petrol bombs in Rathcoole and Ian Paisley being arrested at a rally in Ballymena by Superintendent John Hermon.

With Paisley in custody and an increasing number of Protestants ignoring it the UUAC strike fell apart and before long led to a public spat between Paisley and Tyrie and the end of the relationship between the Democratic Unionist Party and the UDA. Having become associated with the failure the UWC faded from existence.

== Revival attempt ==
Harry Murray became involved in an attempt to revive the UWC in 1982, albeit as a cross-community campaign group that would lobby for the creation of employment and for unity across the working class. This initiative did not take off however.

== Bibliography ==
- J. Bowyer Bell, The Secret Army: The IRA 1916–1979, Poolbeg, 1989
- Robert S Fisk, Point of No Return: the Strike which Broke the British in Ulster, Harper Collins, 1975
- W.D. Flackes & Sydney Elliott, Northern Ireland: A Political Directory 1968–1993, Blackstaff Press, 1994
- Henry McDonald & Jim Cusack, UDA – Inside the Heart of Loyalist Terror, Penguin Ireland, 2004
- Ian S. Wood, Crimes of Loyalty: A History of the UDA, Edinburgh University Press, 2006
