= Army Council =

Army Council may refer to:

- Army Council (1647), of the New Model Army
- Army Council (1904), of the British Army, renamed as the Army Board in 1967
- IRA Army Council, of the Provisional Irish Republican Army
- Ulster Army Council, set up in 1973 as an umbrella group by the Ulster Defence Association and the Ulster Volunteer Force to co-ordinate joint paramilitary operations.
- Continuity Army Council of the Continuity Irish Republican Army
- Army Council (RIRA) of the Real Irish Republican Army
