= Ulster Service Corps =

Loyalist group in 1970s Northern Ireland

The Ulster Service Corps (USC) was a loyalist vigilante group with a paramilitary structure active in Northern Ireland in the late 1970s. Although short-lived it briefly had a sizeable membership. One of a number of small independent loyalist paramilitary groups active in the mid 1970s, alongside the Orange Volunteers, Ulster Volunteer Service Corps, Down Orange Welfare and the Ulster Special Constabulary Association (USCA), the USC was the largest of these minor groups.

Made up of former members of the Ulster Special Constabulary it retained much of that organisation's structure and enjoyed strong support in some rural areas of Northern Ireland. Most of those who established the group had been members of the USCA, which had disbanded around a year before the establishment of the USC.

The group was established in 1976 by the United Unionist Action Council, a sub-committee of the United Ulster Unionist Council (UUUC). It had links to the Orange Order and held meetings at Orange halls but the Order decided against establishing any formal links with the USC, instead continuing to encourage its members to join the official security forces rather than vigilante groups.

During early 1977 it set up roadblocks in parts of County Londonderry, County Armagh and County Tyrone and also claimed to have spent time observing Provisional Irish Republican Army "safe houses" in order to collect data on them. During its roadblocks and related patrols some members of the USC carried guns, although these were generally legally held firearms. During a speech in the House of Commons Ian Paisley even claimed that he had participated in these patrols and both he and Ernest Baird promoted the USC and encouraged their supporters to seek membership of the group. Baird hoped that he could use the USC as his private army in the event of civil unrest resulting from the UUAC strike of 1977.

Its relationship with the security forces was complicated and subject to a number of counter-claims. The Social Democratic and Labour Party claimed that the group was involved in collusion with the Ulster Defence Regiment (UDR) and that the two groups even conducted joint patrols in Mid-Ulster. The USC itself confirmed that it worked with members of both the UDR and the Royal Ulster Constabulary although the security forces strenuously denied that any such activity took place.

A number of its members were brought to court for public order offences and it was condemned by the government, who accused the group of wasting time by forcing them to divert much needed security forces away from their activities in order to deal with USC roadblocks and obstruction. Nonetheless its claims to be purely a defensive organisation were accepted and, as was the case with the Ulster Defence Association at the time, no attempt was made to ban the group.

The fate of the USC is unclear although the failure of the 1977 strike saw the collapse of the UUUC and an end to the Baird-Paisley alliance.
