= Ulster Army Council =

1973 umbrella group of Ulster loyalist paramilitary groups

The Ulster Army Council (or UAC) of Northern Ireland was set up in 1973 as an umbrella group by the Ulster Defence Association and the Ulster Volunteer Force to co-ordinate joint paramilitary operations during the Ulster Workers' Council Strike. Andy Tyrie was the head of the group – and was also the then commander of the Ulster Defence Association.

The following groups along with the UDA and UVF were members of the Ulster Army Council: the Orange Volunteers, Down Orange Welfare, Ulster Special Constabulary Association, Ulster Volunteer Service Corps and Red Hand Commandos. According to Don Anderson the Ulster Service Corps, a group based in County Fermanagh and south Tyrone that was distinct from the similarly named Ulster Volunteer Service Corps, was admitted to the group in early 1974. However most other sources contend the Ulster Service Corps did not actually appear until 1976 or 1977.

The main aim of the group was to set up a Loyalist army of around 20,000 men to take control of Northern Ireland if necessary, to prevent any attempt of the reunification of Ireland, in which the group planned to seize control of Northern Ireland and declare a unilateral declaration of independence (UDI). Its main role at the start of the strike was to mobilise a large vigilante street presence in order to intimidate those workers uncertain about joining the strike, a tactic Tyrie described as essential in order that the strike would succeed. According to journalist Don Anderson, its role became much less important once the strike had been going for a few days as by that stage the majority of the Protestant workforce were behind the initiative voluntarily.

The group was replaced by the Ulster Loyalist Central Co-ordinating Committee (ULCCC) after the 1974 strike.
