= Orange Volunteers (1972) =

Loyalist vigilante group in Northern Ireland

Orange Volunteers (OV)
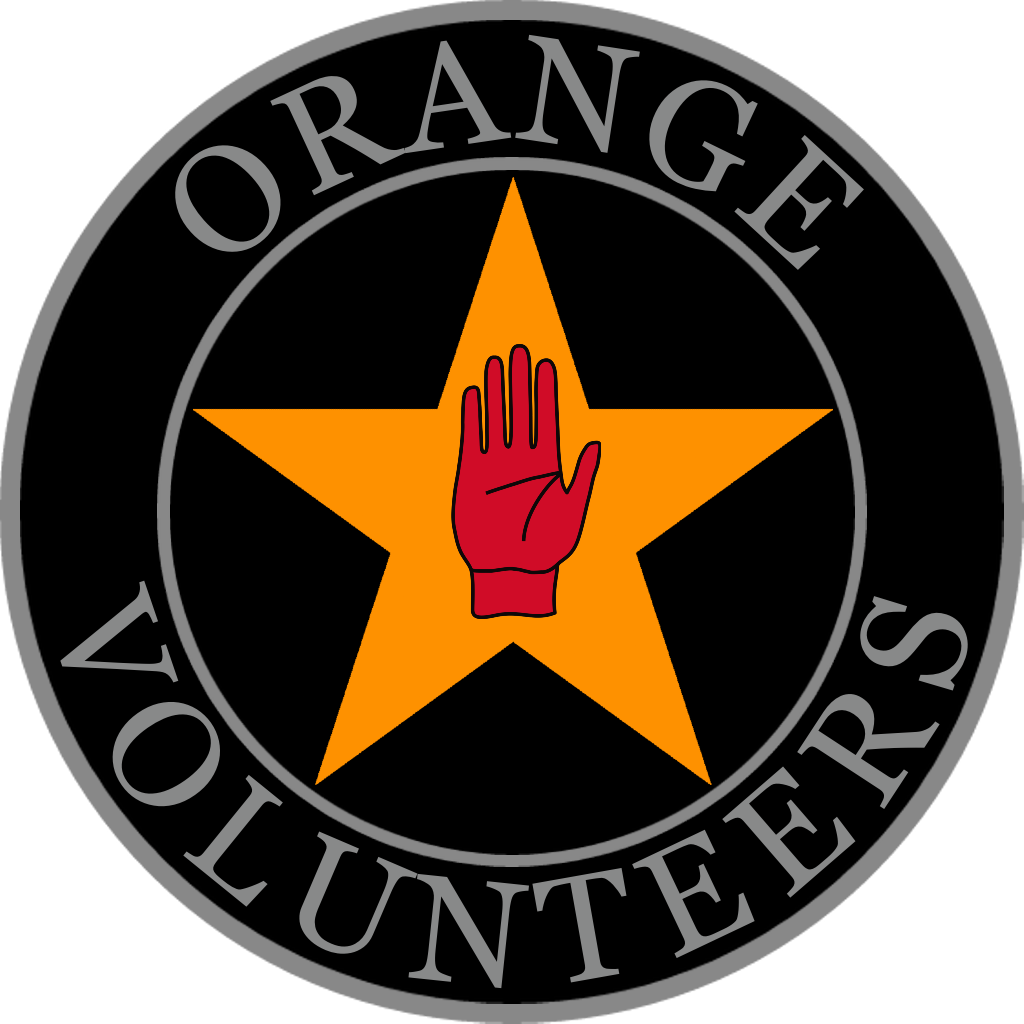
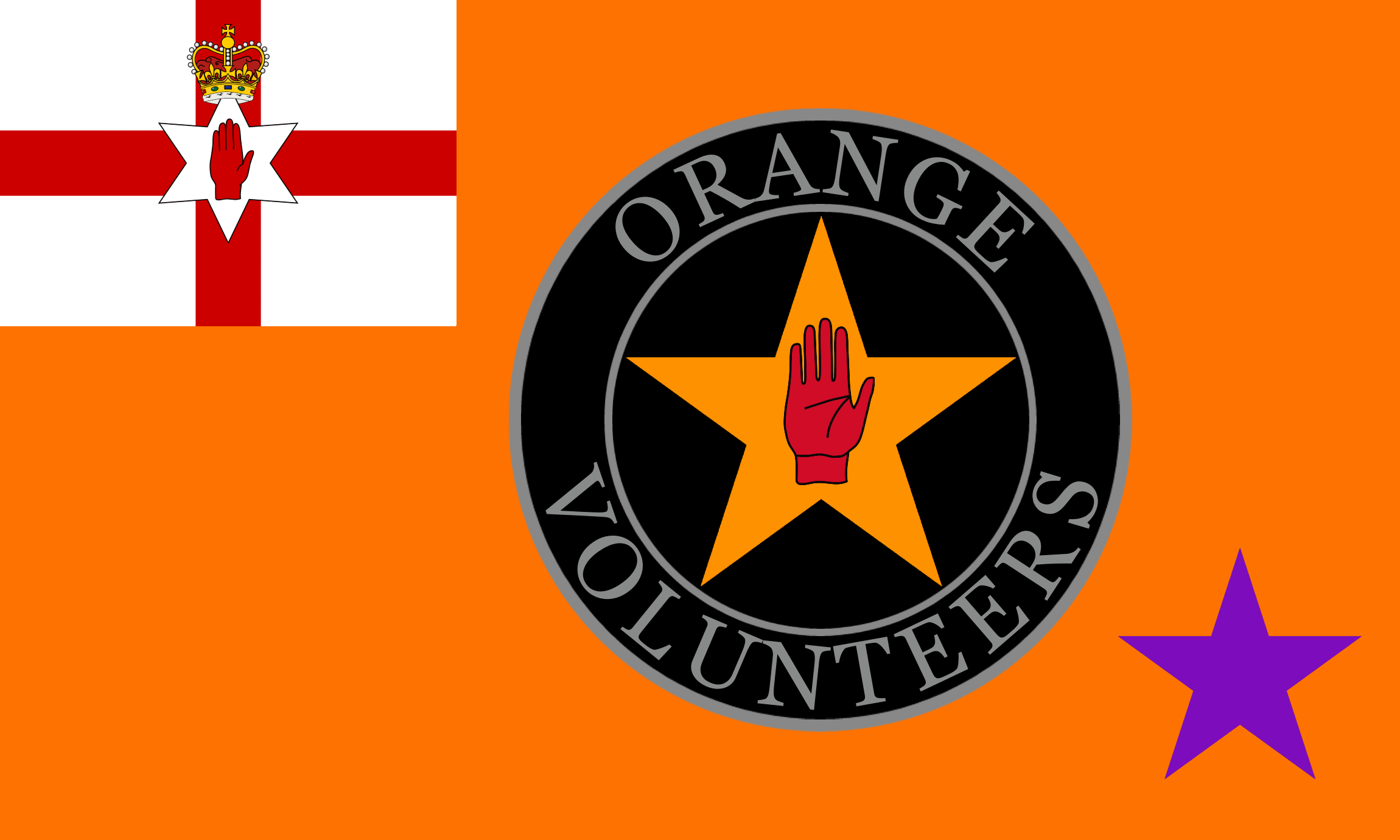
- Above: Emblem of the Orange Volunteers; Below: Flag used by the Orange Volunteers
- Ideology: Ulster loyalism Protestant extremism Anti-Catholicism

The Orange Volunteers (OV) was a loyalist vigilante group with a paramilitary structure active in Northern Ireland during the early 1970s. It took its name from the Orange Order, from which it drew the bulk of its membership.

== Formation ==
The group was established in or around 1972 as a paramilitary movement for members of the Orange Order. Members met in Orange Halls and were drawn exclusively from the Orange Order. Many of its members had previously served in the British Army. Full details of its early membership are sketchy, although its strength was estimated at between 200 and 500 members, most of whom were concentrated in East Belfast and Sandy Row, with some outlying groups in North Down and East Antrim. The group also had a presence in West Belfast in the Shankill Road area. The group was close to the Ulster Vanguard and provided security at some of its rallies, a task usually undertaken by the Vanguard Service Corps.; in September 1972 at a Vanguard rally in Woodvale Park "rows" of uniformed OV members stood beside the speakers' platform as the former junior Minister of Home Affairs John Taylor gave a speech. Following their formation the group was endorsed by leading Orangeman George Watson. However, the Reverend Martin Smyth was not prepared to fully associate the Orange Order with a paramilitary group and so the OV did not receive its official public endorsement. OV leader Bob Marno stated the organisation had a "friendly relationship" with the Orange Order who "were aware of our existence and activities. A newspaper report on Loyalist paramilitaries described the group as "in effect, the military wing of the Orange Order. In June 1972 loyalists staged protests and erected barricades across Northern Ireland to protest the continued existence of republican "no-go" areas. The OV also took part:

Belfast city centre was sealed off as several thousand "Orange Volunteers" paraded in company ranks, accompanied by bands. Although there was distinct paramilitary flavour to the demonstration, absent were the UDA trappings of face-masks, dark glasses and combat jackets. But "officers" who shouted orders wore maroon berets with orange flashes and each contingent wore arm-bands indicating the area of the city from which they came. At the head of each company were colour parties carrying Ulster flags and Union Jacks. The Orange influence was emphasised by men carrying swords, Many members in the ranks wore ex-Service medals.

The leader of the group was Bob Marno, who was also an active figure in the Loyalist Association of Workers. Marno represented the OV on the Ulster Army Council following the establishment of that group in 1973.

== Activities ==
According to Steve Bruce the group carried out a bombing on a Belfast pub in 1973 but otherwise did little publicly of note. The group was involved in stockpiling weapons and stashing them in Orange halls. British Army searches of Orange Halls in Belfast in June 1974 uncovered three arms dumps in a 24-hour period, including explosive training aids, bomb-making equipment, and mortar parts. The searches were prompted by Orange Volunteers documents recovered in earlier British Army raids. In 1977 a pair of OV members from Antrim pleaded guilty to storing arms. However, they only received suspended sentences. When asked about their activities, Marno claimed the group's targets were always "known Republicans". It also enjoyed a close relationship with the much larger Ulster Volunteer Force (UVF) and some of its more militant members were eventually absorbed into that group. In April 1973 their name was attached, along with those of the UVF, the Ulster Defence Association (UDA) and Red Hand Commando (RHC), to a series of posters that appeared in loyalist areas of West Belfast threatening violence to racketeers, particularly those claiming to be paramilitaries. In October 1974 three men were sentenced for the armed robbery of a milk float on behalf of the Orange Volunteers in May the previous year. In 1972 the Belfast Command of the OV claimed British government plans to introduce proportional representation for local council elections in Northern Ireland were "a further step in the downward path of appeasement, designed to placate a rebellious minority."

Its members were active during the Ulster Workers' Council strike of 1974. Around this time it experienced a rush of members and grew in strength to as many as 3,000 men, allowing it to play a leading role in the roadblocks and intimidation that accompanied the strike. During the strike itself the OV was part of a faction of minor loyalist paramilitary groups, represented by the Ulster Special Constabulary Association, Ulster Volunteer Service Corps, Down Orange Welfare and themselves, who pushed for Bill Craig to take a leading role in the running of the strike. The UDA and UVF had hoped to exclude politicians from the conduct of the strike as much as possible but ultimately acquiesced and allowed both Craig and Ian Paisley to play prominent public roles in the stoppage.

== Decline ==
Following the strike, the group helped to form the Ulster Loyalist Central Co-ordinating Committee, which replaced the Ulster Army Council in 1974. In February 1976 the Orange Volunteers claimed Hugh Woodside, a Protestant man shot dead by the British Army during an altercation on the Shankill Road, as a member of the organisation. The group was still in existence in 1977, when Marno was replaced as leader by Jackie Campbell. It supported the United Ulster Unionist Council strike that year. This stoppage, which attempted to replicate the successes of 1974, had little impact. The OV disbanded at an unknown time after this and was certainly defunct by the 1980s. Bob Marno told the Belfast Telegraph in 1980 that the group was dormant.

During the 1981 hunger strike by republican paramilitary prisoners, the Ulster Army Council claimed to have reformed and threatened a renewed campaign of violence. The press statement listed the Orange Volunteers and former B-Specials as members.

In early 1986 it was reported that the OV had "reactivated" in response to the signing of the Anglo-Irish Agreement and could claim 700 members. It was reported upon the founding of Ulster Resistance that the OV had aligned itself to the new paramilitary organisation. In May 1987 wreaths from the Orange Volunteers and other Loyalist paramilitary organisations were displayed outside the Belfast home of William Marchant, a senior member of the UVF shot dead by the IRA.

A separate organisation calling itself the Orange Volunteers emerged in 1998 although members of the original OV disassociated themselves from this new group, claiming that, apart from the name, there was no connection.
