= Ulster Special Constabulary Association =

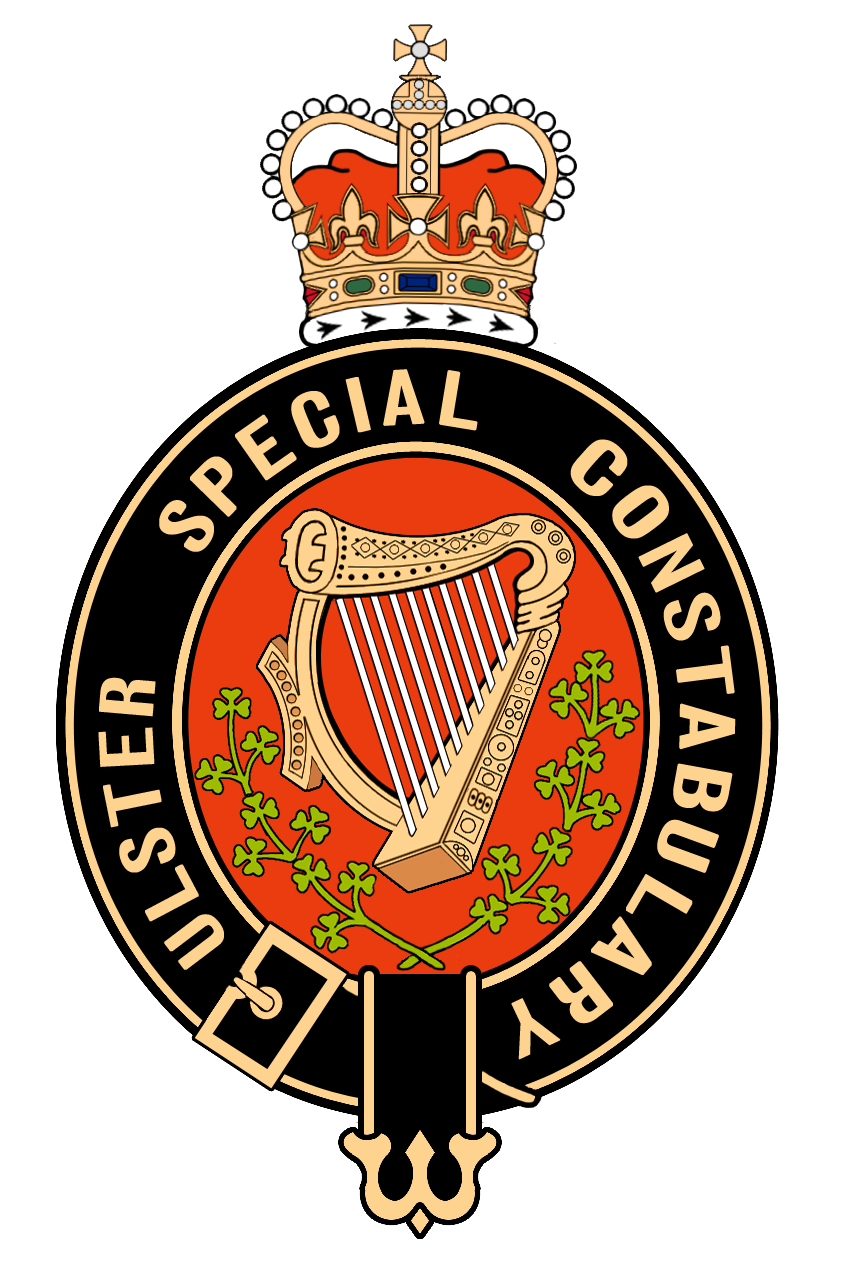
Ulster Special Constabulary badge

The Ulster Special Constabulary Association (USCA) was a loyalist group active in Northern Ireland during the early 1970s.

The group was established following the dissolution of the Ulster Special Constabulary (commonly known as the B Specials) and operated with a semi-paramilitary structure. It initially began as a series of unrelated small groups of former B Specials who maintained contact before eventually crystallising into a formal vigilante group. The group was able to call upon as many as 10,000 members upon its formation in 1970. Initially it functioned mainly as a pressure group, demanding the introduction of tougher laws against the Irish Republican Army as well as a return to a more localised form of policing as typified by the B Specials. Soon however it became more closely associated with existing Ulster loyalist paramilitary groups.

George Green was the leading figure in the USCA and he represented the group on the Ulster Army Council during the run-up to the Ulster Workers' Council strike. Under Green the group co-operated closely with the Ulster Defence Association (UDA), helping them set up weekend roadblocks for five weeks immediately prior to the strike. During the strike itself the USCA was part of a faction of minor loyalist paramilitary groups, represented by the Orange Volunteers, Ulster Volunteer Service Corps, Down Orange Welfare and themselves, who pushed for Bill Craig to take a leading role in the running of the strike. The UDA and UVF had hoped to exclude politicians from the conduct of the strike as much as possible but ultimately acquiesced and allowed both Craig and Ian Paisley to play prominent public roles in the stoppage.

Despite its close associations with loyalism the USCA had an innate conservatism that made many of its members uncomfortable about these links. With the formation of the Ulster Loyalist Central Co-ordinating Committee the group declined membership and distanced itself from the loyalist paramilitaries. The USCA disbanded soon after this although many of its members would subsequently emerge in the 1977 established Ulster Service Corps. Although the USCA did continue in some form up to 1977, apparently releasing a statement condemning Unionist politicians and organisations who were critical of the newly formed Ulster Service Corps.
