= Third Force (Northern Ireland) =

Ulster loyalist paramilitary movement

- Emblem of Third Force.
- Founders: Ian Paisley, Ivan Foster
- Dates active: 1981–???
- Active regions: Northern Ireland
- Ideology: Ulster loyalism Irish unionism Anti-Catholicism
- Size: Unknown
- Wars: The Troubles

The Third Force was the name given to a number of attempts by Northern Irish politician Ian Paisley, then leader of the Democratic Unionist Party (DUP), to create an Ulster loyalist 'defensive militia'.

The best known example was the Third Force rallies on 1 April 1981. At a number of these rallies, large groups of men displayed what were purported to be firearms certificates. Rallies were held on hillsides near Gortin, Newry, and Armagh. On 3 December 1981, Paisley said that the Third Force had between 15,000 and 20,000 members. At Gortin the Royal Ulster Constabulary (RUC) were attacked and two vehicles overturned.

The group was established by Paisley as a complement to the security forces (Paisley had previously been associated with the Ulster Protestant Volunteers loyalist paramilitary group). It grew from opposition to the increasing pace of co-operation between the governments of the United Kingdom and Republic of Ireland, as well as in response to the murder of Robert Bradford. The group largely disappeared with the emergence of Ulster Resistance.

In May 1987, in revenge for the killing of former UDR soldier who also appears on the Ulster Volunteer Forces Roll of Honour Charles Watson, a Royal Ulster Constabulary (RUC) officer who had just attended Watson's wake fired several shots into a restaurant in Castlewellan, County Down, with a Third Force armband on his person.

== Sources ==
- Paul Arthur & Keith Jeffery, Northern Ireland Since 1968, Oxford: Blackwell Publishers, 1996
