= Loyalist Association of Workers =

Militant unionist organization for trade union members in Northern Ireland

The Loyalist Association of Workers (LAW) was a militant unionist organisation in Northern Ireland that sought to mobilise trade union members in support of the loyalist cause. It became notorious for a one-day strike in 1973 that ended in widespread violence.

== Development ==
The LAW was formed in 1971 from an earlier, more minor group, the Workers' Committee for the Defence of the Constitution, and was initially led by Billy Hull, a heavyweight shop steward from Belfast. The LAW first came to prominence in 1972, with the abolition of the Parliament of Northern Ireland, when it became a leading force for the campaign against this move, ultimately coming to work closely with both the Vanguard Progressive Unionist Party (for which Hull stood as a candidate after the Sunningdale Agreement) and the Ulster Defence Association (UDA). The group took part in a number of joint protests with the Vanguard. At its peak it claimed some 100,000 members.

The LAW organised a "Day of Action" on 7 February 1973 when its members ensured that electricity supplies were halted in Belfast and other areas and forced the closure of many shops through intimidation. Protests were also organised outside Royal Ulster Constabulary stations, some of which turned violent, whilst a number of fires were lit, with a fire-fighter killed by a loyalist sniper in Sandy Row. A gun battle with the army ended with two loyalists killed, a Protestant and a Catholic were found murdered in separate attacks, whilst a Catholic church in Belfast's Newtownards Road and a Catholic children's home in Newtownabbey were attacked by loyalist mobs in what proved to be a night of violence. Hull nonetheless congratulated his members and declared the Day of Action a success despite five deaths.

The reaction of mainstream unionism was less congratulatory however as street violence and especially gun battles with the army an anathema to more respectable unionist leaders. Sensing the shift in opinion, the LAW issued a statement on 12 February condemning the "lawless hooliganism and vandalism" of that night. For William Whitelaw, at the time Secretary of State for Northern Ireland, the actions of the LAW and in particular their control over the Northern Ireland power supply, confirmed his privately held belief that open conflict between the British Army and loyalist paramilitary groups was inevitable.

== Relationship with paramilitaries ==
The group was represented on the umbrella loyalist Ulster Loyalist Central Co-ordinating Committee established in 1973. Several members of the LAW, not least Hull, were also members of the UDA and one prominent figure in both groups was James Johnston, who worked for a haulage firm on the Grosvenor Road. On 22 August 1972 members of the Provisional IRA abducted him from his workplace and took him to the neighbouring Falls Road where he was shot and killed. Johnston's murder made him one of the first UDA members to be killed by republicans.

== Decline ==
Despite initially hailing it as a huge success the Day of Action saw the LAW go into decline. Mainstream unionism had baulked at the excesses of the night whilst some members were suspicious of Hull, feeling that his background in the Northern Ireland Labour Party brought his loyalism into question. For his part Hull spoke of converting the LAW into a working-class loyalist party in the immediate aftermath of the strike, something that drove a wedge between him and his closest political ally Vanguard leader Bill Craig. Meanwhile, disagreements over how the LAW should become involved in anti-internment campaigns and whether or not rent and rates strikes, a favourite tactic of the Northern Ireland Civil Rights Association in the late 1960s, saw the movement disintegrate.

The lack of a fully formalised structure meant that the LAW lost the vast majority of its membership following the formation of the Ulster Workers' Council (UWC) and ceased to exist in the middle of 1974. According to Henry McDonald and Jim Cusack the UWC was established by Harry Murray because he wanted a loyalist workers group that was nonetheless independent of paramilitary control whilst the LAW was wholly run by the UDA. Davy Fogel would also claim that the LAW was " a front organisation for us [the UDA]". However, the LAW was notable because it pioneered the idea of using industrial action to advance the demands of unionism, which reached fruition with the Ulster Workers Council Strike.

LAW became inactive, but Bob Pagles, who had led with Murray and had considered joining a cross-community peace movement, instead decided to restart it. Becoming its leader, he represented it on the United Unionist Action Council, which held an unsuccessful strike in 1977.
