= Ulster loyalism =

Pro-UK political ideology in Northern Ireland

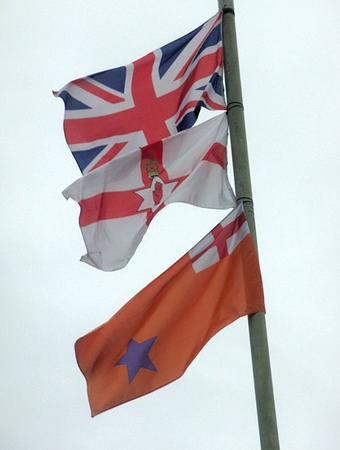
The Union Flag, Ulster Banner and Orange Order flags are often flown by loyalists in Northern Ireland.

Ulster loyalism is a strand of Ulster unionism associated with working class Ulster Protestants in Northern Ireland. Like other unionists, loyalists support the continued existence of Northern Ireland (and formerly all of Ireland) within the United Kingdom, and oppose a united Ireland independent of the UK. Unlike other strands of unionism, loyalism has been described as an ethnic nationalism of Ulster Protestants and "a variation of British nationalism". Loyalists are often said to have a conditional loyalty to the British state so long as it defends their interests. They see themselves as loyal primarily to the Protestant British monarchy rather than to British governments and institutions, while Garret FitzGerald argued they are loyal to 'Ulster' over 'the Union'. A small minority of loyalists have called for an independent Ulster Protestant state, believing they cannot rely on British governments to support them (see Ulster nationalism). The term 'loyalism' is usually associated with paramilitarism.

Ulster loyalism emerged in the late 19th century, in reaction to the Irish Home Rule movement and the rise of Irish nationalism. Ireland had a Catholic majority who wanted self-government, but the province of Ulster had a Protestant and unionist majority, largely due to the Plantation of Ulster. Although not all unionists were Protestant, loyalists emphasised their British Protestant heritage. During the Home Rule Crisis (1912–14), loyalists founded the paramilitary Ulster Volunteers to prevent Ulster from becoming part of a self-governing Ireland. This was followed by the Irish War of Independence (1919–21) and partition of Ireland: most of Ireland became an independent state, while most of Ulster remained within the UK as the self-governing territory of Northern Ireland. During partition, communal violence raged between loyalists and Irish nationalists in Belfast, and loyalists attacked the Catholic minority in retaliation for Irish republican activity.

Northern Ireland's unionist governments discriminated against Catholics and Irish nationalists. Loyalists opposed the Catholic civil rights movement, accusing it of being a republican front. This unrest led to the Troubles (1969–98). During the conflict, loyalist paramilitaries such as the Ulster Volunteer Force (UVF) and Ulster Defence Association (UDA) often attacked Catholics, partly in retaliation for republican paramilitary actions. Loyalists undertook major protest campaigns against the 1973 Sunningdale Agreement and 1985 Anglo-Irish Agreement. The paramilitaries called ceasefires in 1994 and their representatives were involved in negotiating the 1998 Good Friday Agreement. Since then, loyalists have been involved in protests against perceived threats to their cultural identity. Sections of the loyalist paramilitaries have attacked Catholics, taken part in loyalist feuds, and withdrawn support for the Agreement, although their campaigns have not resumed.

In Northern Ireland there is a tradition of loyalist Protestant marching bands, who hold numerous parades each year. The yearly Eleventh Night (11 July) bonfires and The Twelfth (12 July) parades are associated with loyalism.

== History ==
The term loyalist was first used in Irish politics in the 1790s to refer to Protestants who opposed Catholic Emancipation and Irish independence from Great Britain.

Ulster loyalism emerged in the late 19th century, in response to the Irish Home Rule movement and the rise of Irish nationalism. At the time, all of Ireland was part of the United Kingdom. Although the island had a Catholic majority who wanted self-government, the northern province of Ulster had a Protestant majority who wanted to maintain a close union with Britain, a political tradition called Unionism. This was largely due to the Plantation of the province. Eastern Ulster was also more industrialised and dependent on trade with Britain than most other parts of Ireland. Although not all Unionists were Protestant or from Ulster, loyalism emphasised Ulster Protestant heritage. It began as a self-determination movement of Ulster Protestants who did not want to become part of a self-governing Ireland, believing it would be dominated by Catholic Irish nationalists.

=== Home Rule crisis and Partition ===
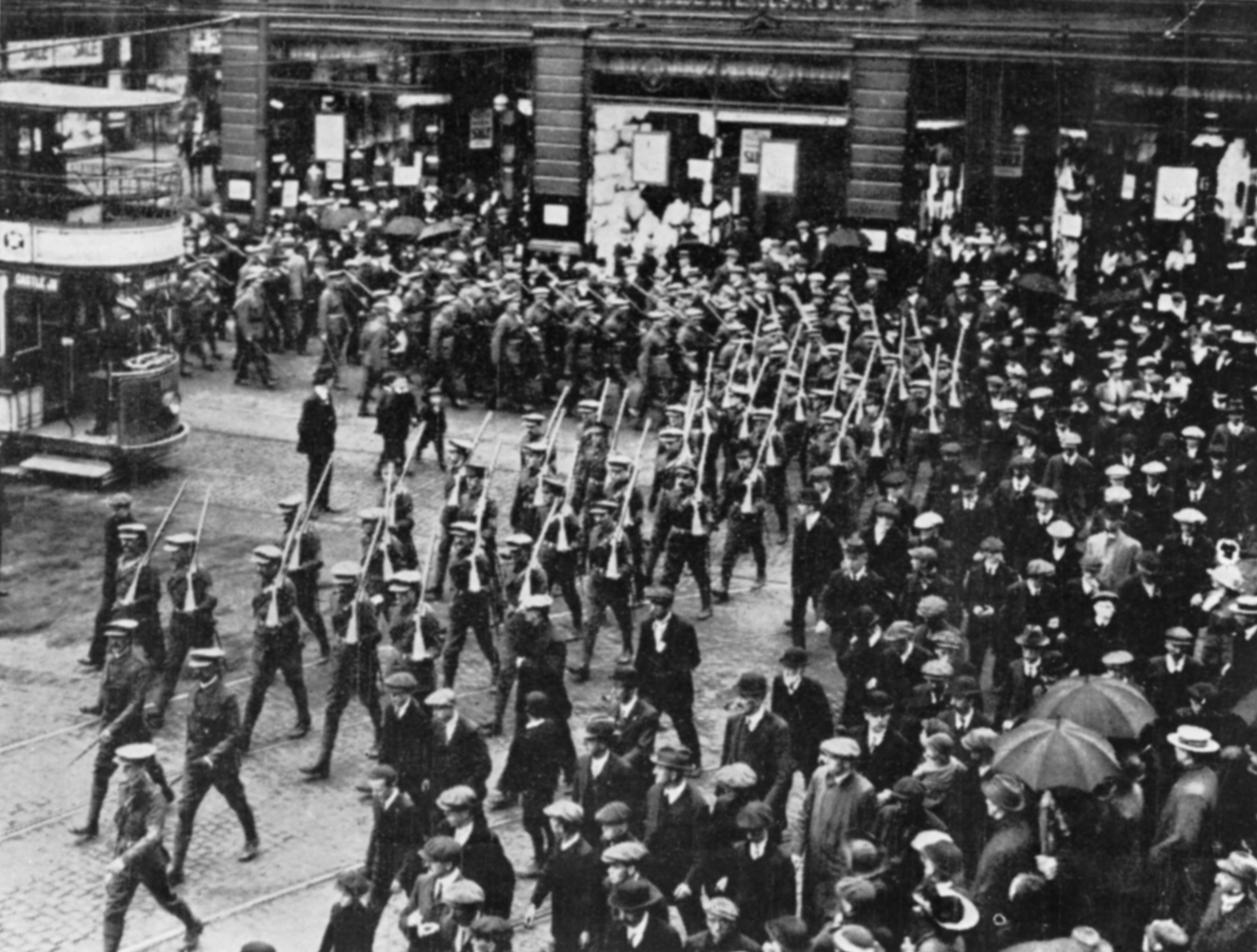
Ulster Volunteers in Belfast c. 1914

The British government's introduction of the Third Home Rule Bill in 1912 sparked the Home Rule Crisis. Ulster unionists signed the Ulster Covenant, pledging to oppose Irish home rule by any means. They founded a large paramilitary force, the Ulster Volunteers, threatening to violently resist the authority of any Irish government over Ulster. The Ulster Volunteers smuggled thousands of rifles and rounds of ammunition into Ulster from Imperial Germany. In response, Irish nationalists founded the Irish Volunteers to ensure home rule was implemented. Home rule was postponed by the outbreak of the First World War in 1914. Both loyalists and nationalists fought in the war, with many Ulster Volunteers joining the 36th (Ulster) Division.

By the end of the war, most Irish nationalists wanted full independence. After winning most Irish seats in the 1918 general election, Irish republicans declared an Irish Republic, leading to the Irish War of Independence between the Irish Republican Army (IRA) and British forces. Meanwhile, the Fourth Home Rule Bill passed through the British parliament in 1920. It would partition Ireland into two self-governing polities within the UK: a Protestant-majority Northern Ireland, and a Catholic-majority Southern Ireland. During 1920–22, in what became Northern Ireland, partition was accompanied by violence both in defence of and against partition. Belfast saw "savage and unprecedented" communal violence, mainly between Protestant loyalist and Catholic nationalist civilians. Loyalists attacked the Catholic minority in reprisal for IRA actions. Thousands of Catholics and "disloyal" Protestants were driven from their jobs, particularly in the shipyards, and there were mass burnings of Catholic homes and businesses in Lisburn and Banbridge. More than 500 were killed in Northern Ireland during partition and more than 10,000 became refugees, most of them Catholics. See: The Troubles in Ulster (1920–1922).

In 1926, about 33–34% of the Northern Ireland population was Roman Catholic, with 62% belonging to the three major Protestant denominations (Presbyterian 31%, Church of Ireland 27%, Methodist 4%).

=== The Troubles ===
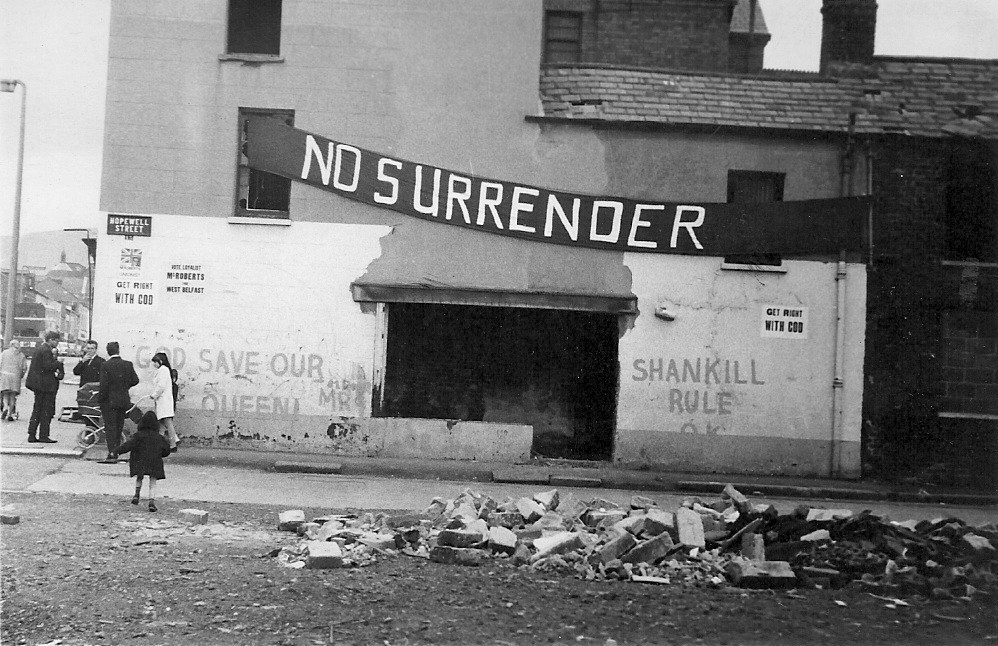
Loyalist graffiti and banner on a building in a side street off the Shankill Road, Belfast (1970)

The Unionist governments of Northern Ireland discriminated against the Irish nationalist and Catholic minority. A non-violent campaign to end discrimination began in the late 1960s. This civil rights campaign was opposed by loyalists, who accused it of being a republican front. Loyalist opposition was led primarily by Ian Paisley, a Protestant fundamentalist preacher. They held counter-protests, attacked civil rights marches, and put pressure on moderate unionists. Loyalist militants carried out false flag bombings that were blamed on republicans and civil rights activists. This unrest led to the August 1969 riots. Irish nationalists/republicans clashed with both police and with loyalists, who burned hundreds of Catholic homes and businesses. The riots led to the deployment of British troops and are often seen as the beginning of the Troubles.

The beginning of the Troubles saw a revival of loyalist paramilitaries, notably the Ulster Volunteer Force (UVF) and Ulster Defence Association (UDA). Their stated goals were to defend Protestant areas, to fight those they saw as "enemies of Ulster" (namely republicans), and thwart any step towards Irish unification. The Provisional Irish Republican Army waged a paramilitary campaign to force a British withdrawal from Northern Ireland. Loyalist paramilitaries attacked the Catholic community as alleged retaliation for IRA actions, and the vast majority of their victims were random Catholic civilians. During the Troubles there were incidents where British security forces colluded with loyalist paramilitaries, such as the attacks by the Glenanne group.

Signed in 1973, the Sunningdale Agreement sought to end the conflict by establishing power-sharing government between unionists and Irish nationalists, and ensuring greater co-operation with the Republic of Ireland. In protest, loyalists organised the Ulster Workers' Council strike in May 1974. It was enforced by loyalist paramilitaries and brought large parts of Northern Ireland to a standstill. During the strike, loyalists detonated a series of car bombs in Dublin and Monaghan, in the Republic. This killed 34 civilians, making it the deadliest attack of the Troubles. The strike brought down the agreement and power-sharing government.

Loyalists were involved in the major protest campaign against the 1985 Anglo-Irish Agreement. They saw it as a breach of sovereignty, because it gave the Republic an advisory role in some Northern Ireland affairs. The many street protests led to loyalist clashes with the Royal Ulster Constabulary (RUC), whom loyalists accused of enforcing the Agreement and betraying the Protestant community. This caused a rift between loyalists and the police, and there were numerous loyalist attacks on police officers' homes during the protests.

From the late 1980s, there was a rise in loyalist paramilitary violence, partly due to anger over the Anglo-Irish Agreement. It also resulted from loyalist groups being re-armed with weapons smuggled from South Africa, overseen by British Intelligence agent Brian Nelson. From 1992 to 1994, loyalists carried out more killings than republicans. The deadliest attacks during this period were the Greysteel massacre by the UDA and Loughinisland massacre by the UVF.

The main loyalist paramilitary groups called a ceasefire in 1994, shortly after the Provisional IRA's ceasefire and beginning of the Northern Ireland peace process. This ceasefire came under strain during the Drumcree dispute of the mid-to-late 1990s. The Protestant Orange Order was blocked from marching its traditional route through the Catholic part of Portadown. Catholic residents held mass protests against the yearly march, seeing it as triumphalist and supremacist, forcing police to halt the march. Loyalists saw this as an assault on Ulster Protestant traditions, and held violent protests throughout Northern Ireland. In Portadown, thousands of loyalists attacked lines of police and soldiers guarding the Catholic district. A new UVF splinter group, the Loyalist Volunteer Force (LVF), attacked Catholics over a two-year period before calling a ceasefire.

=== After the Good Friday Agreement ===
Loyalist representatives helped negotiate the Good Friday Agreement of 1998, and it was backed by the UVF-linked Progressive Unionist Party and UDA-linked Ulster Democratic Party. However, wider loyalist support for the Agreement was tenuous from the outset, and these parties received many fewer votes than the main unionist parties: the pro-Agreement UUP and anti-Agreement DUP.

Since the Agreement, loyalist paramilitaries have been involved in riots, feuds between loyalist groups, organised crime, vigilantism such as punishment shootings, and racist attacks. Some UDA and LVF brigades broke the ceasefire and attacked Catholics under the name Red Hand Defenders, but the paramilitary campaigns did not resume.

The 2001 Holy Cross protests drew world-wide condemnation as loyalists were shown hurling abuse and missiles, some explosive, others containing excrement, at very young Catholic schoolchildren and parents. Loyalist residents picketed the school in protest at alleged sectarianism from Catholics in the area. Many other loyalist protests and riots have been sparked by restrictions on Orange marches, such as the 2005 Whiterock riots. The widespread loyalist flag protests and riots of 2012–13 followed Belfast City Council voting to limit the flying of the Union Flag from council buildings. Loyalists saw it as an "attack on their cultural identity".

The Loyalist Communities Council was launched in 2015 with the backing of the UVF and UDA. It seeks to reverse what it sees as political and economic neglect of working-class loyalists since the Good Friday Agreement. In 2021, it withdrew its support for the Agreement, due to the creation of a trade border between Northern Ireland and Britain as a result of Brexit. The fall-out over this partly fuelled loyalist rioting that Spring.

== Political parties ==
=== Active parties ===
- Democratic Unionist Party (DUP), the second-largest party in the Northern Ireland Assembly
- Traditional Unionist Voice (TUV)
- Progressive Unionist Party (PUP), which is linked to the Ulster Volunteer Force (UVF) and Red Hand Commando (RHC)

=== Former parties ===
- Protestant Coalition (2013–2015)
- Ulster Democratic Party (1981–2001)
- Ulster Vanguard (1972–1978)
- Volunteer Political Party (1974)
- Ulster Protestant League (1930s)

== Paramilitary and vigilante groups ==
Loyalist paramilitary and vigilante groups have been active since the early 20th century. In 1912, the Ulster Volunteers were formed to stop the British Government granting self-rule to Ireland, or to exclude Ulster from it. This led to the Home Rule Crisis, which was defused by the onset of World War I. Loyalist paramilitaries were again active in Ulster during the Irish War of Independence (1919–22), and more prominently during the Troubles (late 1960s–1998). The biggest and most active paramilitary groups existed during the Troubles, and were the Ulster Volunteer Force (UVF), and the Ulster Defence Association (UDA)/Ulster Freedom Fighters (UFF). They, and most other loyalist paramilitaries, are classified as terrorist organisations.

During the Troubles, their stated goals were to combat Irish republicanism – particularly the Provisional Irish Republican Army (IRA) – and to defend Protestant loyalist areas. However, the vast majority of their victims were Irish Catholic civilians, who were often killed at random in sectarian attacks. Whenever they claimed responsibility for attacks, loyalists usually claimed that those targeted were IRA members or were helping the IRA. M.L.R. Smith wrote that "From the outset, the loyalist paramilitaries tended to regard all Catholics as potential rebels". Other times, attacks on Catholic civilians were claimed as "retaliation" for IRA actions, since the IRA drew most of its support from the Catholic community. Such retaliation was seen as both collective punishment and an attempt to weaken the IRA's support; some loyalists argued that terrorising the Catholic community and inflicting a high death toll on it would eventually force the IRA to end its campaign. According to then Prime Minister Tony Blair, "The purpose of loyalist terrorism was to retaliate, to dominate or to clear out Catholics." An editorial in the UVF's official magazine Combat stated in 1993:

...large areas of the Province that were predominately Protestant are now predominately Catholic. The reaction to this has been that the Ulster Volunteer Force and the Ulster Defence Association have intensified their campaign in order, not just to match the Catholic murders of Protestants, but to stop further encroachment into their areas.

Loyalist paramilitaries were responsible for 29% of all deaths in the Troubles, and were responsible for about 48% of all civilian deaths. Loyalist paramilitaries killed civilians at far higher rates than both Republican paramilitaries and British security forces. Soldiers from the locally recruited Ulster Defence Regiment (UDR) and police officers from the Royal Ulster Constabulary (RUC) colluded with loyalist paramilitaries, such as taking part in loyalist attacks (e.g. the Glenanne gang), giving weapons and intelligence to loyalists, not taking action against them, and hindering official investigations.

The modus operandi of loyalist paramilitaries involved assassinations, mass shootings, bombings and kidnappings. They used sub machine-guns, assault rifles, pistols, grenades (including homemade grenades), incendiary bombs, booby trap bombs and car bombs. Bomb attacks were usually made without warning. However, gun attacks were more common than bombings. In January 1994, the UDA drew up a 'doomsday plan', to be implemented should British troops be withdrawn from Northern Ireland. It called for ethnic cleansing and re-partition, with the goal of making Northern Ireland wholly Protestant.

Some loyalist paramilitaries have had links with far-right and Neo-Nazi groups in Britain, including Combat 18, the British National Socialist Movement, and the National Front. Since the 1990s, loyalist paramilitaries have been responsible for numerous racist attacks in loyalist areas. A 2006 report revealed that 90% of racist attacks in the previous two years occurred in mainly loyalist areas.

In the 1990s, the main loyalist paramilitaries called ceasefires. Following this, small breakaway groups continued to wage violent campaigns for a number of years, and members of loyalist groups have continued to engage in sporadic violence.

A telephone poll conducted in March 1993 by the News Letter, a Belfast-based newspaper with a unionist editorial stance, sought the view of the Protestant community on a recent upsurge in loyalist paramilitary violence. The poll found that 42 per cent of callers responded "Yes" to the question: "Do you support loyalist paramilitary violence?" Over 50 per cent of callers chose "Yes" in response to the question "Do you believe there are any current circumstances in which loyalist paramilitary violence is justified?"

== Fraternities and marching bands ==
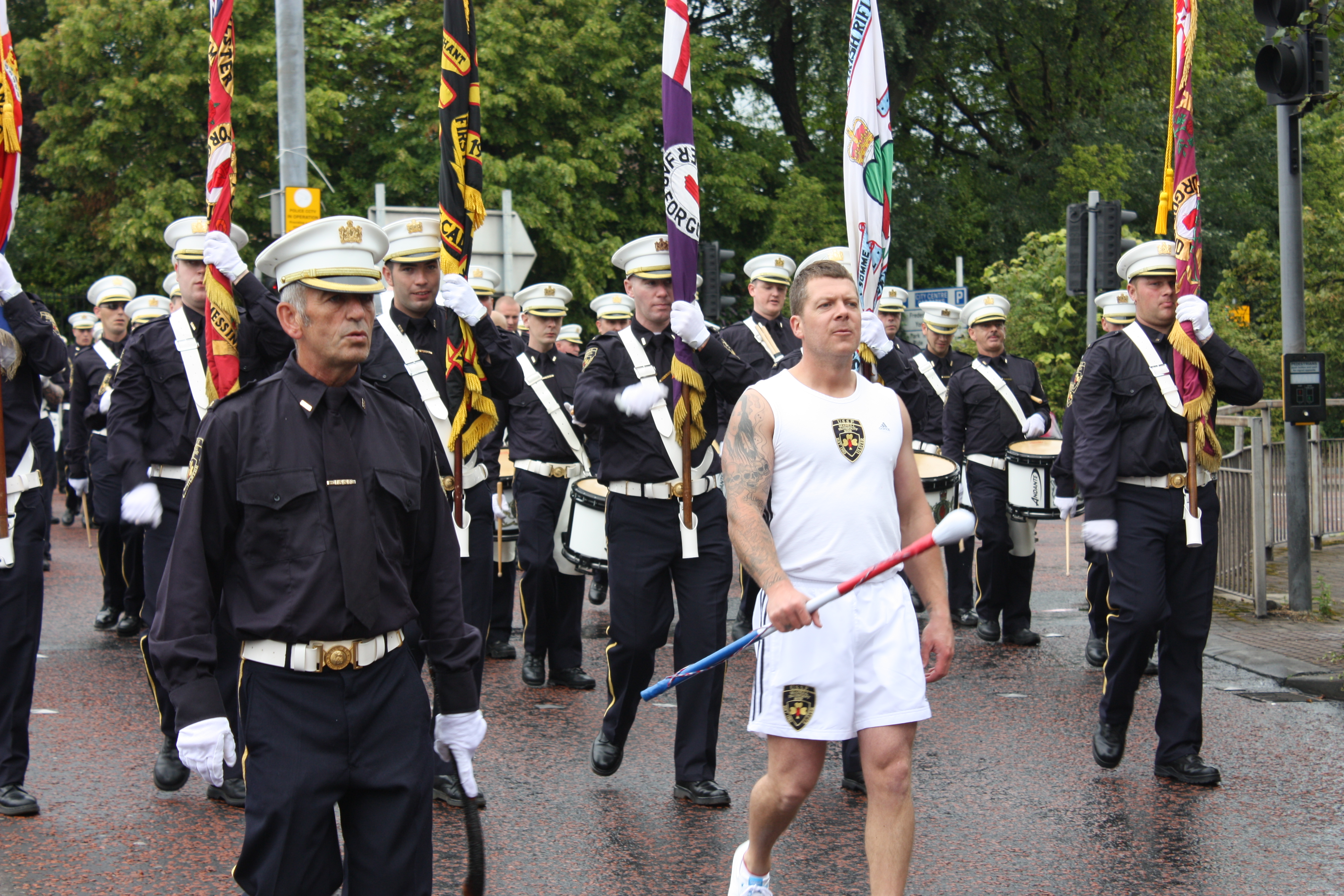
A loyalist marching band on The Twelfth, 2011

In Northern Ireland there are a number of Protestant fraternities and marching bands who hold yearly parades. They include the Orange Order and Apprentice Boys of Derry. These fraternities, often described as the "Loyal Orders", have long been associated with unionism/loyalism. Yearly events such as the Eleventh Night (11 July) bonfires and The Twelfth (12 July) parades are strongly associated with loyalism. A report published in 2013 estimated there were at least 640 marching bands in Northern Ireland with a total membership of around 30,000, an all-time high. According to the Parades Commission, a total of 1,354 loyalist parades (not counting funerals) were held in Northern Ireland in 2007. The Police Service of Northern Ireland uses different statistics, and recorded a total of 2,863 parades in 2007. Of these, 2,270 (approximately 80%) were held by loyalist marching bands.

== Other groups ==
- Third Force
- Loyalist Association of Workers
- Ulster Workers' Council
- Ulster Political Research Group
- Tara (Northern Ireland)
- Glenanne gang
- Shankill Butchers
- Orange Volunteers
- Orange Volunteers (1972)
- Ulster Resistance
- Ulster Special Constabulary Association
- Down Orange Welfare
- Ulster Protestant Volunteers

== See also ==
- Anti-Irish sentiment – Hostility or prejudice towards Irish people

== Bibliography ==
- Potter, John Furniss. A Testimony to Courage – the Regimental History of the Ulster Defence Regiment 1969–1992, Pen & Sword Books Ltd, 2001, ISBN 0-85052-819-4
- Ryder, Chris. The Ulster Defence Regiment: An Instrument of Peace?, 1991 ISBN 0-413-64800-1
