= Down Orange Welfare =

Loyalist group during the Troubles

Down Orange Welfare was an Ulster loyalist paramilitary vigilante group active in Northern Ireland during the 1970s. Operating in rural areas of County Down, the group faded after failing to win support away from larger groups such as the Ulster Defence Association (UDA) and Ulster Volunteer Force (UVF).

== Founding ==
The group was established in 1972 by its commander, Lieutenant-Colonel Peter Brush and his deputy Herbert Heslip, both members of the Ulster Unionist Party (UUP). Claiming to be linked to the Orange Order, the group was said to have 5,000 trained activists, many of whom were serving members of the security forces and former members of the Ulster Special Constabulary, commonly referred to as the "B Specials". The group, which was highly conservative and élitist in nature, was strongest amongst the farming community of North Down. There were also a number of local small businessmen involved.

The stated aim of Down Orange Welfare was to oppose both the growth of both Irish republicanism and socialism. As such it has been portrayed as a "doomsday outfit" preparing itself to oppose any anticipated nationalist rebellion. It formed part of the umbrella Ulster Army Council that was established in 1973. It also established contact with the National Front, a group that was also close to the Ulster Volunteer Force at the time. Down Orange Welfare was a member of the loyalist paramilitary body, the Ulster Army Council. According to Brush, Down Orange Welfare also maintained a liaison officer for the Ulster Defence Association.

It was active in the Ulster Workers' Council strike of May 1974 and members of the group blocked roads during the ensuing protests. After the 1974 strike the group joined the Ulster Loyalist Central Co-ordinating Committee, but left along with the Ulster Defence Association in 1976 after it emerged that Red Hand Commando leader John McKeague and other members were holding meetings with members of the Provisional IRA and also discussing plans for an independent Northern Ireland with leading Catholic figures. They were also involved in the less successful United Unionist Action Council (UUAC) strike of 1977. The group declined after this second strike and disappeared soon afterwards. Brush would disappear from public view along with the movement. In 1979 Bill Hannigan, who had been a representative of Down Orange Welfare on the 1974 strike committee, was sentenced to ten years in prison for firearms offences. Hannigan was a former member of the British Army's Royal Irish Fusiliers and stood unsuccessfully in local government elections before the strike. Brush, interviewed in 1980, said the group was in "suspended animation" and drilling and assemblies had ceased.

In March 1982, a spokesman for Down Orange Welfare denied any knowledge of recent road blocks mounted by the Third Force in north County Down.

It was reported in 1986 that remnants of Down Orange Welfare had joined the new loyalist paramilitary group Ulster Resistance.

== UVF Mid-Ulster Brigade ==
According to Royal Ulster Constabulary (RUC) Special Patrol Group officer John Weir, the group had engaged in manufacturing weapons for the UVF Mid-Ulster Brigade, which was commanded from 1975 to the early 1990s by Robin Jackson. Jackson had taken over as leader when the brigade's founder, Billy Hanna was shot to death outside his home in Lurgan; the killing was allegedly perpetrated by Jackson. The weapons were transferred to the UVF through the medium of several RUC officers based at Newry station, including Weir. Weir alleged that he personally received two Sterling submachine guns from Down Orange Welfare which he then handed over to the Mid-Ulster Brigade. The weapons had been made in Spa, County Down by the group who were at the time in the process of manufacturing an M1 carbine. Weir named former Ulster Defence Regiment (UDR) soldier Samuel McCoubrey as the chief gunmaker for Down Orange Welfare; in 1988 McCoubrey was arrested after his engineering works in Ballynahinch was uncovered as a facility for manufacturing submachine guns. In his confession, McCoubrey admitted to having been paid to manufacture submachine guns for loyalist paramilitaries since 1972. Weir also claimed that Chief Superintendent Harry Breen was a member of Down Orange Welfare and had been present when he was given the guns. These allegations against Breen are staunchly denied by his former RUC colleagues.

Weir was convicted in 1980 of the murder of Catholic chemist William Strathearn which had taken place in 1977. Harry Breen was one of two RUC officers killed in a Provisional IRA ambush outside Jonesborough, County Armagh in March 1989.

Despite its overt militancy, Down Orange Welfare was never directly implicated in any killing nor apparently were any attacks attributed to the group.
