= Narrative photography =

Photographs used to tell a story

Narrative photography is the idea that photographs can be used to tell a story. Allen Feldman stated that "the event is not what happens, the event is that which can be narrated". Because photography captures single discrete moments, and narrative as described by Jerome Bruner is irreducibly temporal, it might seem photography cannot actually represent narrative structure. Susan Sontag made this objection in her book, On Photography:

"The ultimate wisdom of the photographic image is to say ‘There is the surface, now think or rather feel, intuit, what is beyond it, what the reality must be like if it looks this way’. Photographs which cannot themselves explain anything, are inexhaustible invitations to deduction, speculation, and fantasy. Strictly speaking, one never understands anything from a photograph, Nevertheless, the camera's rendering of reality must always hide more than it discloses. As Brecht points out, "a photograph of the Krupp works [munitions factory] reveals virtually nothing about the organization". In contrast to the amorous relation, which is based on how something looks, understanding is based on how it functions. And functioning takes place in time, and must be explained in time. Only that which narrates can make us understand.” (p.23)

The same objection could apply to painting, sculpture, mosaic, drawing or any medium that presents a single image for appreciation and contemplation. However, it could be argued that photography and the traditional arts both tell stories and give accounts with this difference:

In painting, the artist puts meaning into the picture.

In photography, the photographer invites us to get meaning out of the picture.

The Narrative Photography Competition in Portland, Oregon describes the concept of narrative photography: "The power of narrative, or story telling is at the foundation of much of photography. Photographers are creating complex and descriptive moments in time. Contemporary photographers are crafting and documenting new forms of a visual short story". This field of work is also applied in many academic works of anthropological research, specially in the Visual Anthropology.

Examples of narrative photography include the work of Gregory Crewdson, and Steve Giovinco, both graduates of the Yale School of Art Department of Photography.
