= The Troubles =

1960s–1998 conflict in Northern Ireland

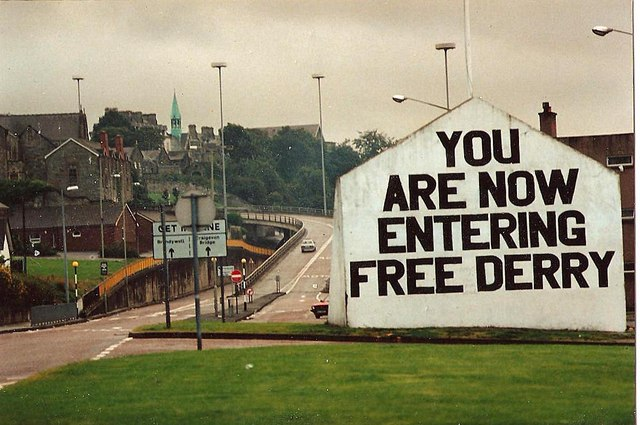
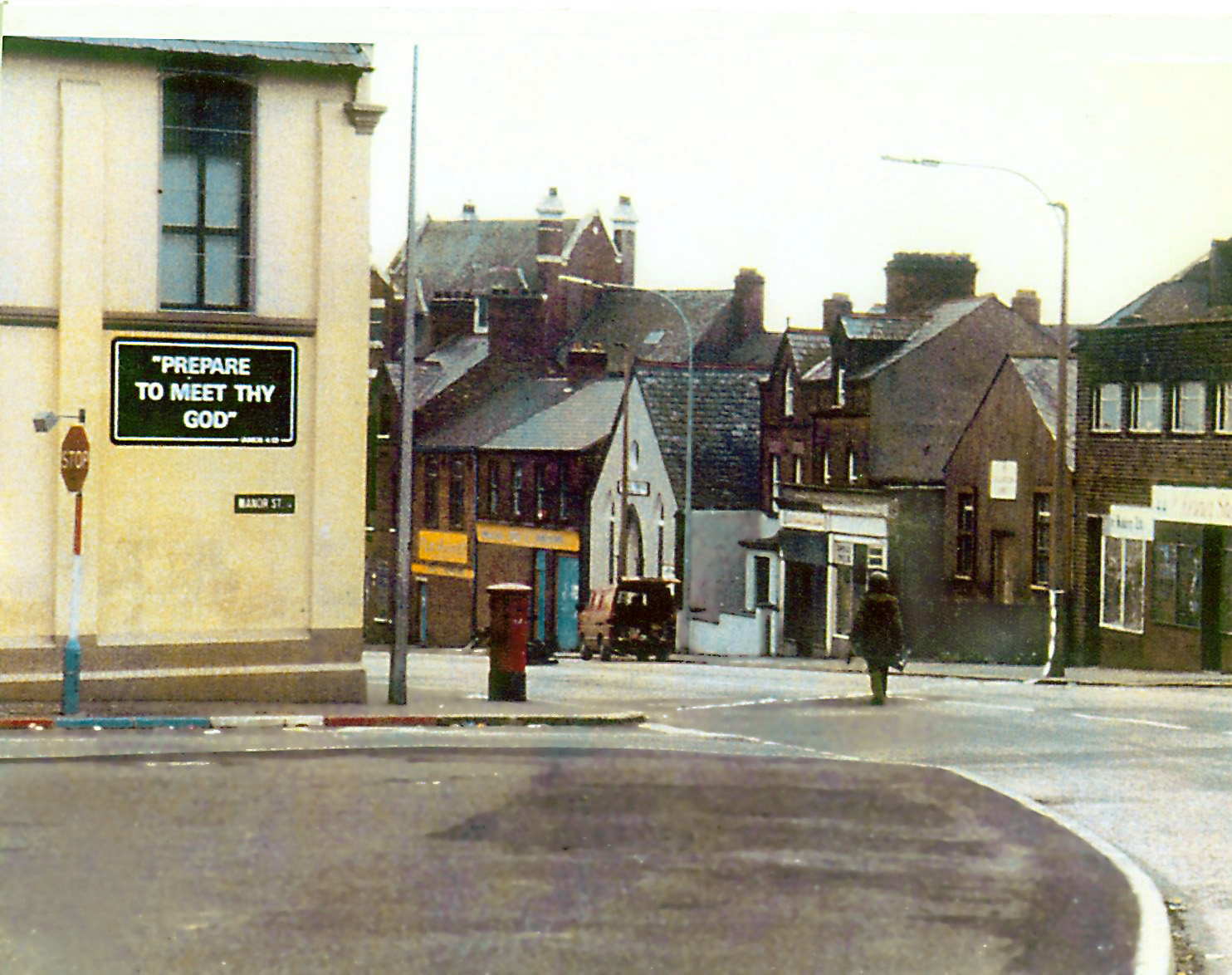
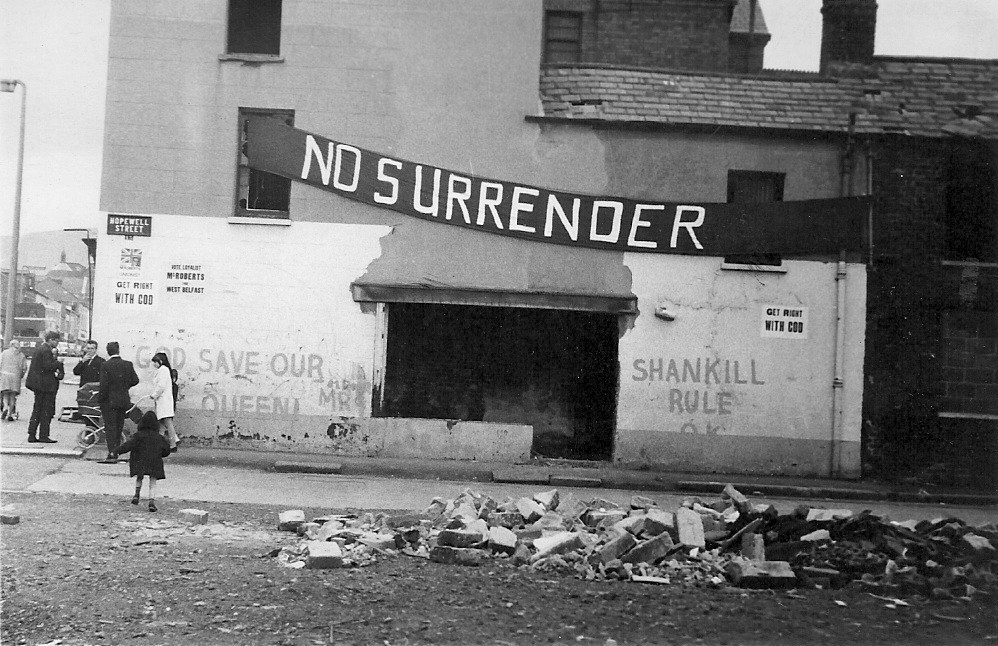
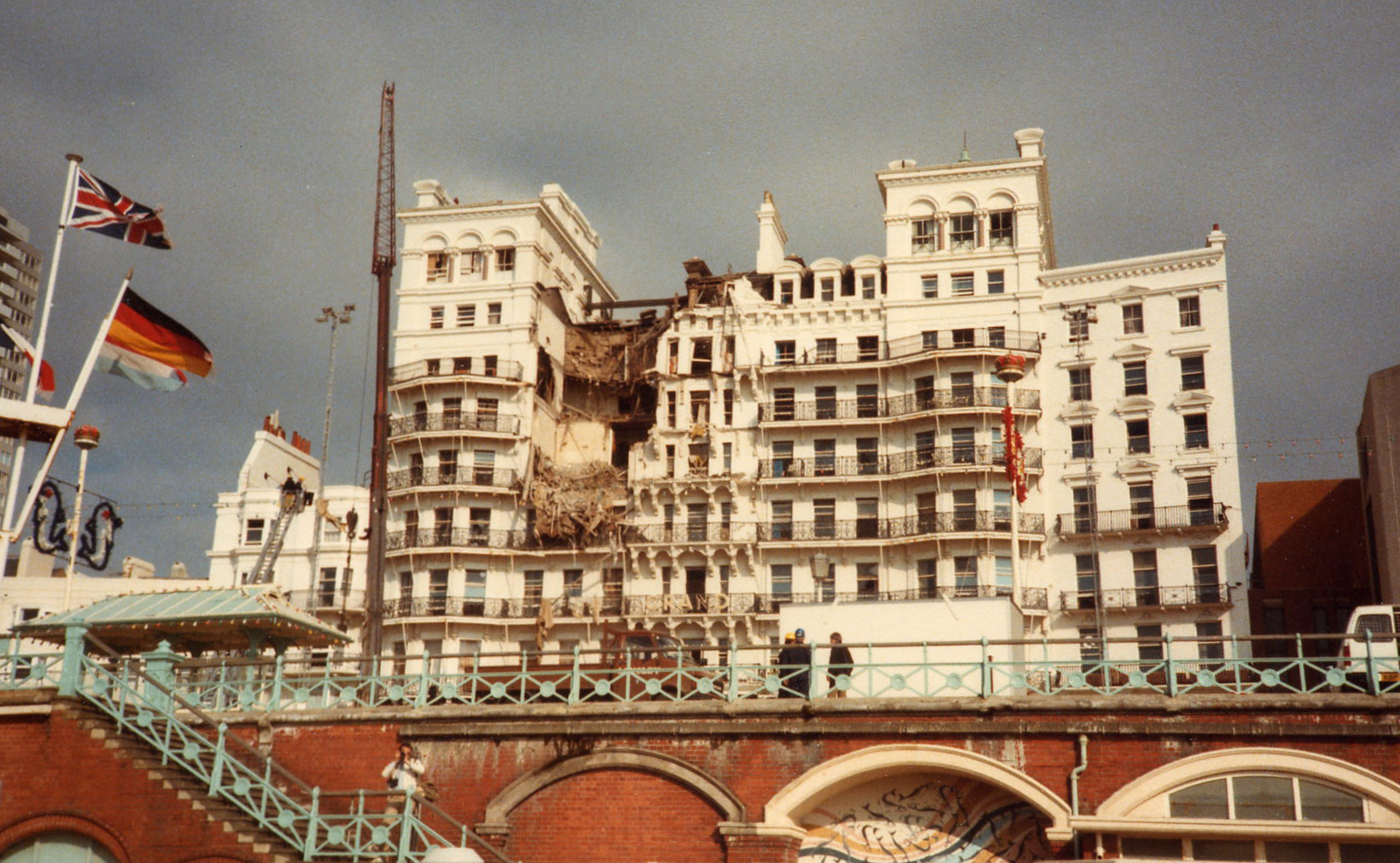
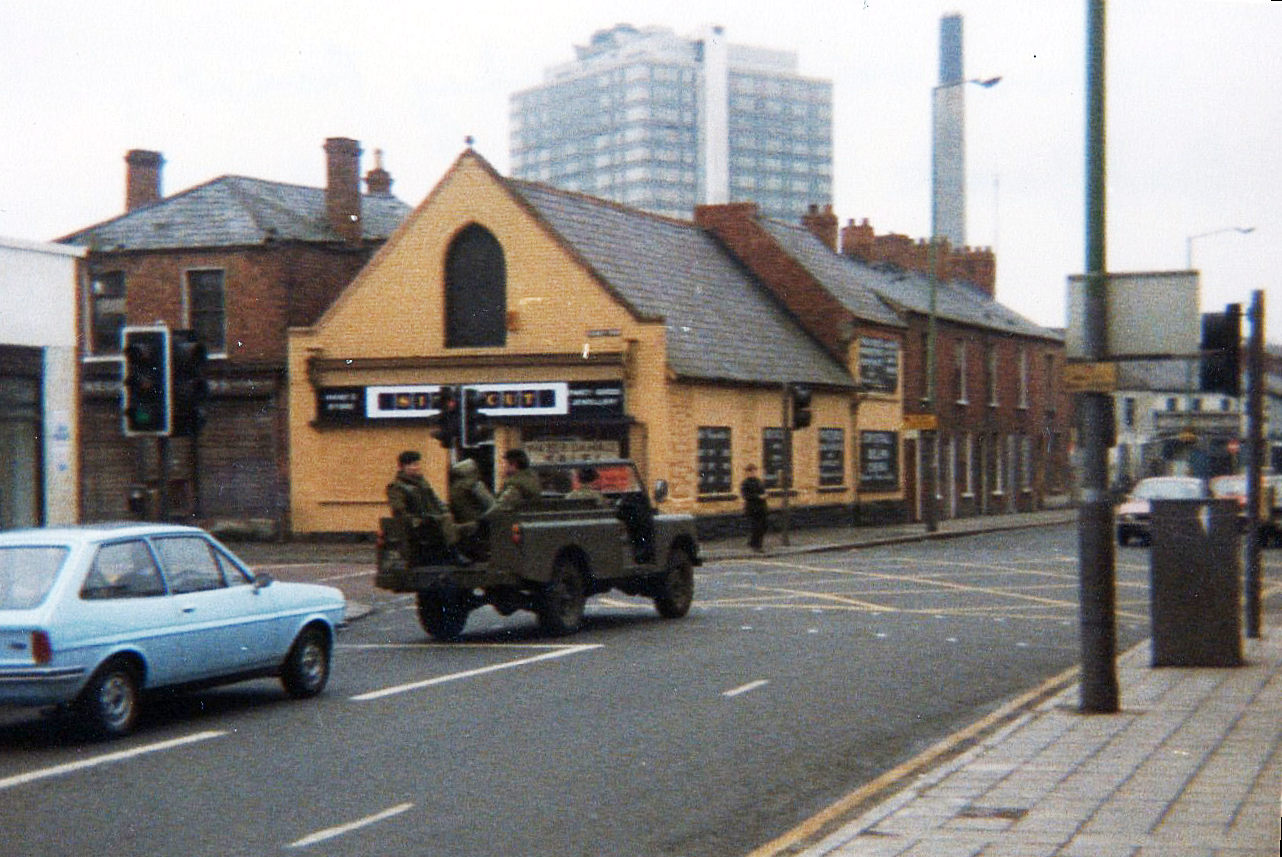
- From top to bottom, left to right: Free Derry corner in May 1984; An IRA volunteer loads an RPG-7 during the Battle of Newry Road in 1993.; A British Army Technical Officer approaches a suspect device in Belfast, Northern Ireland.; Loyalist graffiti in the predominantly-protestant Shankill Road of Belfast in 1970.; The Grand Brighton Hotel following an IRA bombing in October 1984.; British soldiers patrolling in South Belfast in 1981.
Date	Late 1960s – 1998 (Note: The exact starting date of the Troubles is disputed; the most common dates proposed include the formation of the modern Ulster Volunteer Force in 1966, the civil rights march in Derry on 5 October 1968, the beginning of the 'Battle of the Bogside' on 12 August 1969 or the deployment of British troops on 14 August 1969.)
Location	Northern Ireland (Note: There were occasional violent incidents in the Republic of Ireland, England and mainland Europe)
Result	Military stalemate; Good Friday Agreement (1998); St Andrews Agreement (2006); Withdrawal of British forces taking part in Operation Banner; Disarmament of paramilitary groups; Continuing sporadic violence

Belligerents
State security forces: British Armed Forces; Royal Ulster Constabulary; Irish Defence Forces; Gardaí	Irish republican paramilitaries: Provisional Irish Republican Army (PIRA); Irish National Liberation Army (INLA); Official Irish Republican Army (OIRA); Continuity Irish Republican Army (CIRA); Real Irish Republican Army (RIRA); Irish People's Liberation Organisation (IPLO)	Ulster loyalist paramilitaries: Ulster Defence Association (UDA); Ulster Volunteer Force (UVF); Red Hand Commando (RHC); Ulster Resistance (UR); Loyalist Volunteer Force (LVF); Ulster Protestant Volunteers (UPV)

Casualties and losses
British Army: 705; (incl. UDR); RUC: 301; NIPS: 24; TA: 7; Other UK police: 6; Royal Air Force: 4; Royal Navy: 2; Total: 1,049; Irish Army: 1; Gardaí: 9; IPS: 1; Total: 11	PIRA: 292; INLA: 38; OIRA: 27; IPLO: 9; RIRA: 2; Total: 368	UDA: 91; UVF: 62; RHC: 4; LVF: 3; UR: 2; UPV: 1; Total: 162
- Civilians killed: 1,840; (1,935 including ex-combatants); Total dead: 3,532; Total injured: 47,500+; All casualties: c. 50,000

The Troubles (Irish: Na Trioblóidí) were an ethno-nationalist conflict in Northern Ireland that lasted from the late 1960s to 1998. Also known internationally as the Northern Ireland conflict, it is usually deemed to have ended with the Good Friday Agreement of 1998. Although centred in Northern Ireland, violence at times spilled into the Republic of Ireland, England, and mainland Europe. The conflict arose from political and nationalistic disputes with a strong ethnic and sectarian dimension. Unionists and loyalists, mostly Ulster Protestants, wanted Northern Ireland to remain in the United Kingdom, while Irish nationalists and republicans, mostly Irish Catholics, wanted it to join a united Ireland. Despite the division between Protestants and Catholics, it was not a religious war.

Tensions escalated during a campaign by the Northern Ireland Civil Rights Association to end discrimination against the Catholic‑nationalist minority. The government attempted to suppress the protests, and the Royal Ulster Constabulary (RUC) was criticised for sectarianism and police brutality. Loyalists opposed the campaign, believing it was a front for republican activity. The August 1969 riots led to the deployment of British troops, in what became the British Army's longest operation. "Peace walls" were built to separate communities, and Catholic support for the Army declined after Bloody Sunday in 1972. The main participants included republican paramilitaries such as the Provisional IRA and INLA, loyalist paramilitaries such as the UVF and UDA, British state forces including the British Army and RUC, and political activists. The conflict involved guerrilla and bombing campaigns, sectarian tit‑for‑tat violence, feuds within and between paramilitary groups, counterinsurgency operations, incidents of collusion, riots, mass protests, civil disobedience, and the creation of temporary no‑go areas.

More than 3,500 people were killed, of whom 52% were civilians, 32% were members of the British security forces, and 16% were members of paramilitary groups. Republican paramilitaries were responsible for 60% of total deaths, loyalist paramilitaries for 30%, and security forces for 10%. Loyalists were responsible for 48% of civilian deaths, republicans for 39%, and security forces for 10%. The Northern Ireland peace process led to paramilitary ceasefires and talks between the main political parties, resulting in the Good Friday Agreement of 1998. It restored self‑governance on the basis of "power‑sharing" and included the principle of consent, civil and political rights, parity of esteem, police reform, paramilitary disarmament, and early release of prisoners. Sporadic violence has continued, including punishment attacks, loyalist gangs' control of organised crime, and violent crime linked to dissident republican groups.

== Name ==
The word "troubles" has been used as a synonym for violent conflict for centuries. It was used to describe the 17th-century Wars of the Three Kingdoms by all three national parliaments. For example, after the Restoration in 1660, the English Indemnity and Oblivion Act 1660 starts with "The King's most excellent Majesty, taking into his gracious and serious consideration the long and great troubles ..."; as does the similar act in Scotland: "The king's most excellent majesty, considering that by the late troubles diverse of his subjects ..." (Scottish Parliament 1662); and by the Irish Parliament in the Act of Explanation (1665) "our royal father of blessed memory had been forced, during the late troubles, to make with the Irish subjects of that our kingdom" (Irish Parliament 1665, § 2). The term was used to describe the Irish revolutionary period in the early twentieth century. It was subsequently adopted to refer to the escalating violence in Northern Ireland after 1969.

== Background ==
=== 1609–1791 ===
The Battle of the Boyne, fought during the Williamite War

In 1609, Scottish and English settlers, known as planters, were given land escheated from the native Irish in the Plantation of Ulster. Coupled with Protestant immigration to "unplanted" areas of Ulster, particularly Antrim and Down, this resulted in conflict between the native Catholics and the "planters", leading in turn to two bloody religious conflicts known as the Irish Confederate Wars (1641–1653) and the Williamite War in Ireland (1689–1691), both of which resulted in Protestant victories.

Anglican dominance in Ireland was ensured by the passage of the Penal Laws that curtailed the religious, legal, and political rights of anyone (including both Catholics and Protestant Dissenters, such as Presbyterians) who did not conform to the state church, the Anglican Church of Ireland. As the Penal Laws started to be phased out in the latter part of the 18th century, there was more competition for land, as restrictions were lifted on the Irish Catholic ability to rent. With Irish Catholics allowed to buy land and enter trades from which they had formerly been banned, tensions arose resulting in the Protestant "Peep o' Day Boys" and Catholic "Defenders". This created polarisation between the communities and a dramatic reduction in reformers among Protestants, many of whom had been growing more receptive to democratic reform.

=== 1791–1912 ===
Following the foundation of the republican Society of the United Irishmen by Presbyterians, Catholics, and liberal Anglicans, and the resulting failed Irish Rebellion of 1798, sectarian violence between Catholics and Protestants continued. The Orange Order (founded 1795), with its stated goal of upholding the Protestant faith and loyalty to the heirs of William of Orange, dates from this period and remains active to this day.

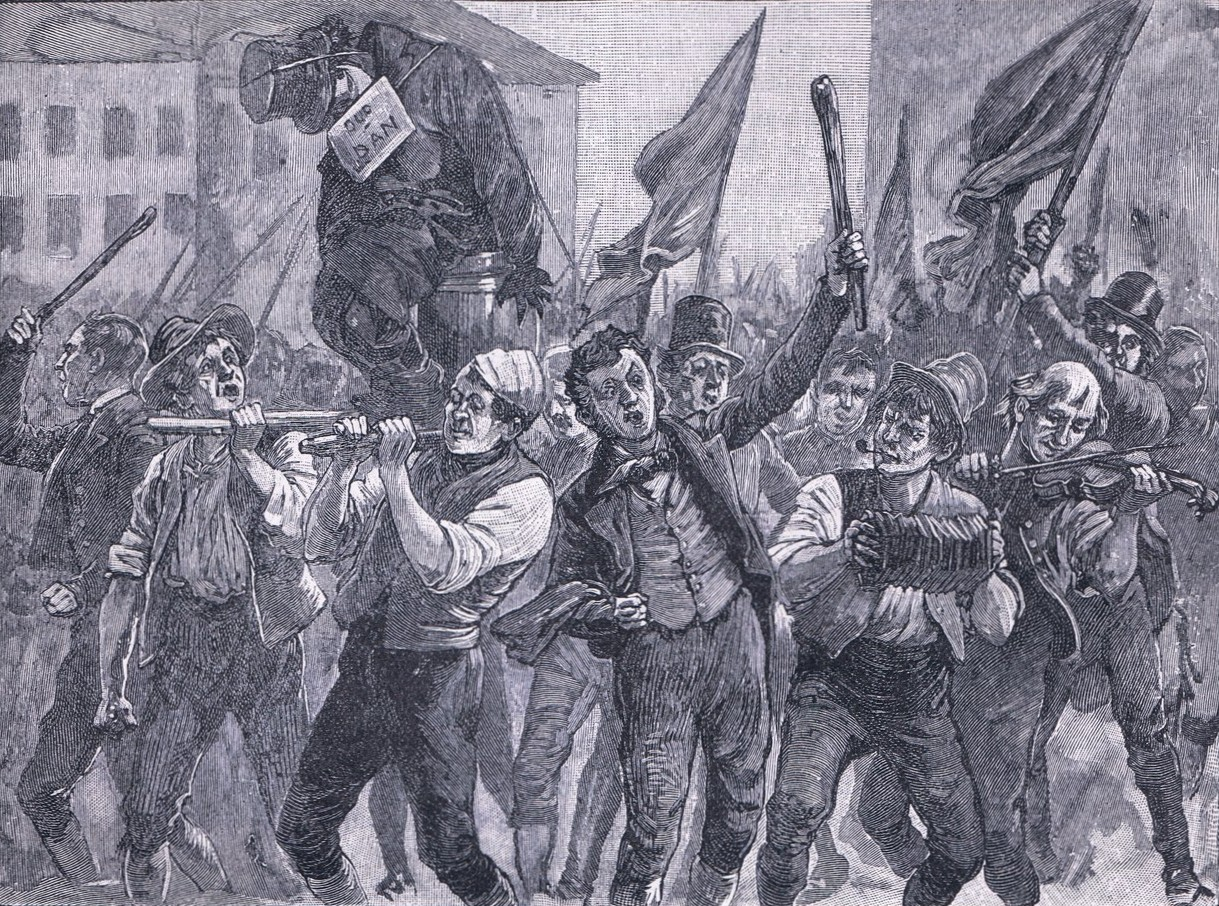
Protestant demonstrators burning an effigy of Daniel O’Connell, an incident that sparked the Belfast riots of 1864

With the Acts of Union 1800 (which came into force on 1 January 1801), a new political framework was formed with the abolition of the Irish Parliament and incorporation of Ireland into the United Kingdom of Great Britain and Ireland. The result was a closer tie between Anglicans and the formerly republican Presbyterians as part of a "loyal" Protestant community. Although Catholic emancipation was achieved in 1829, largely eliminating official discrimination against Roman Catholics (then around 75% of Ireland's population), Dissenters, and Jews, the Repeal Association's campaign to repeal the 1801 Union failed.

In the late 19th century, the Home Rule movement was created and served to define the divide between most nationalists (usually Catholics) who sought the restoration of an Irish Parliament, and most unionists (usually Protestants) who were afraid of being a minority under a Catholic-dominated Irish Parliament and who tended to support continuing union with Great Britain.

Unionists and Home Rule advocates were the main political factions in late 19th- and early 20th-century Ireland.

=== 1912–1922 ===
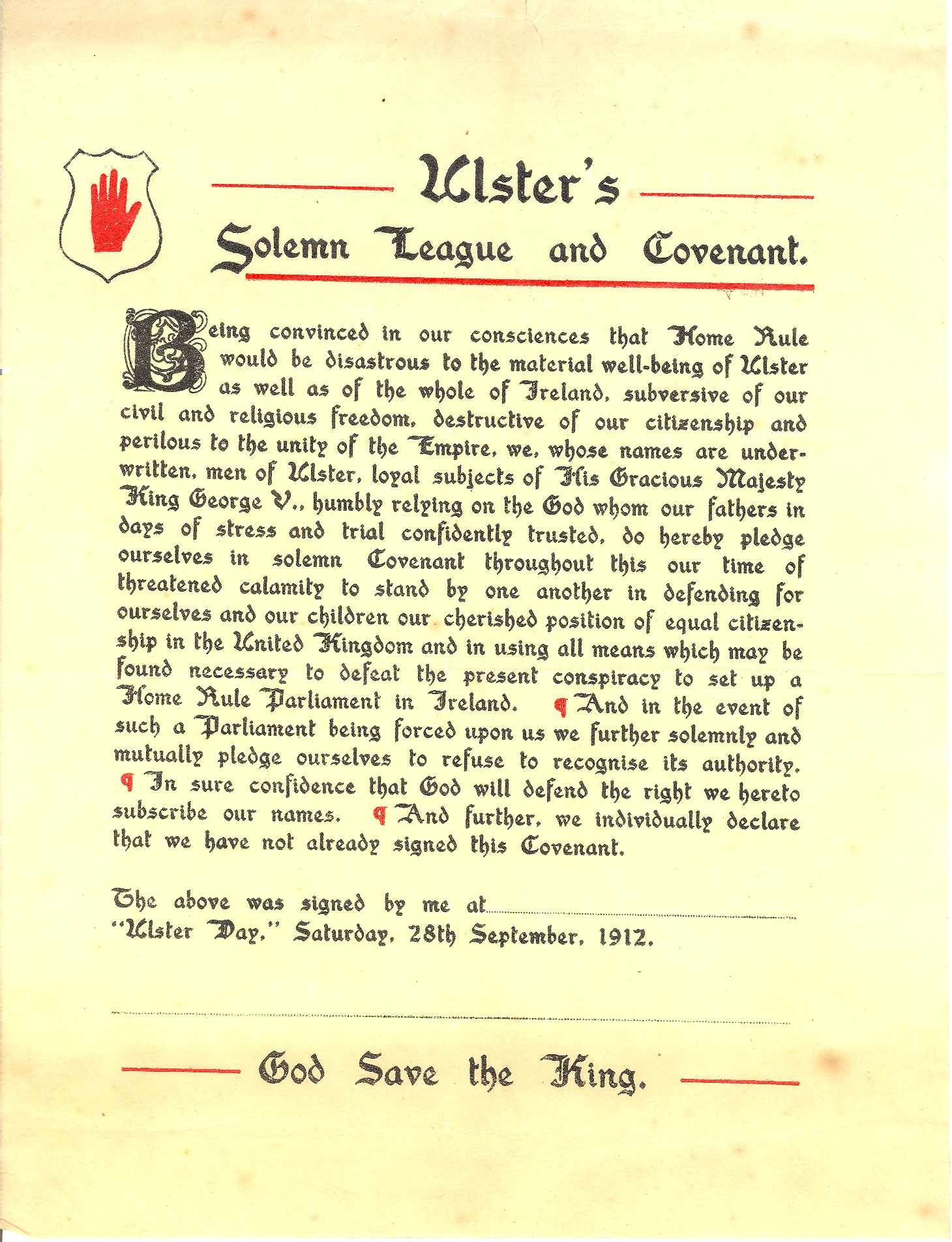
The Ulster Covenant was issued in protest against the Third Home Rule Bill in September 1912.

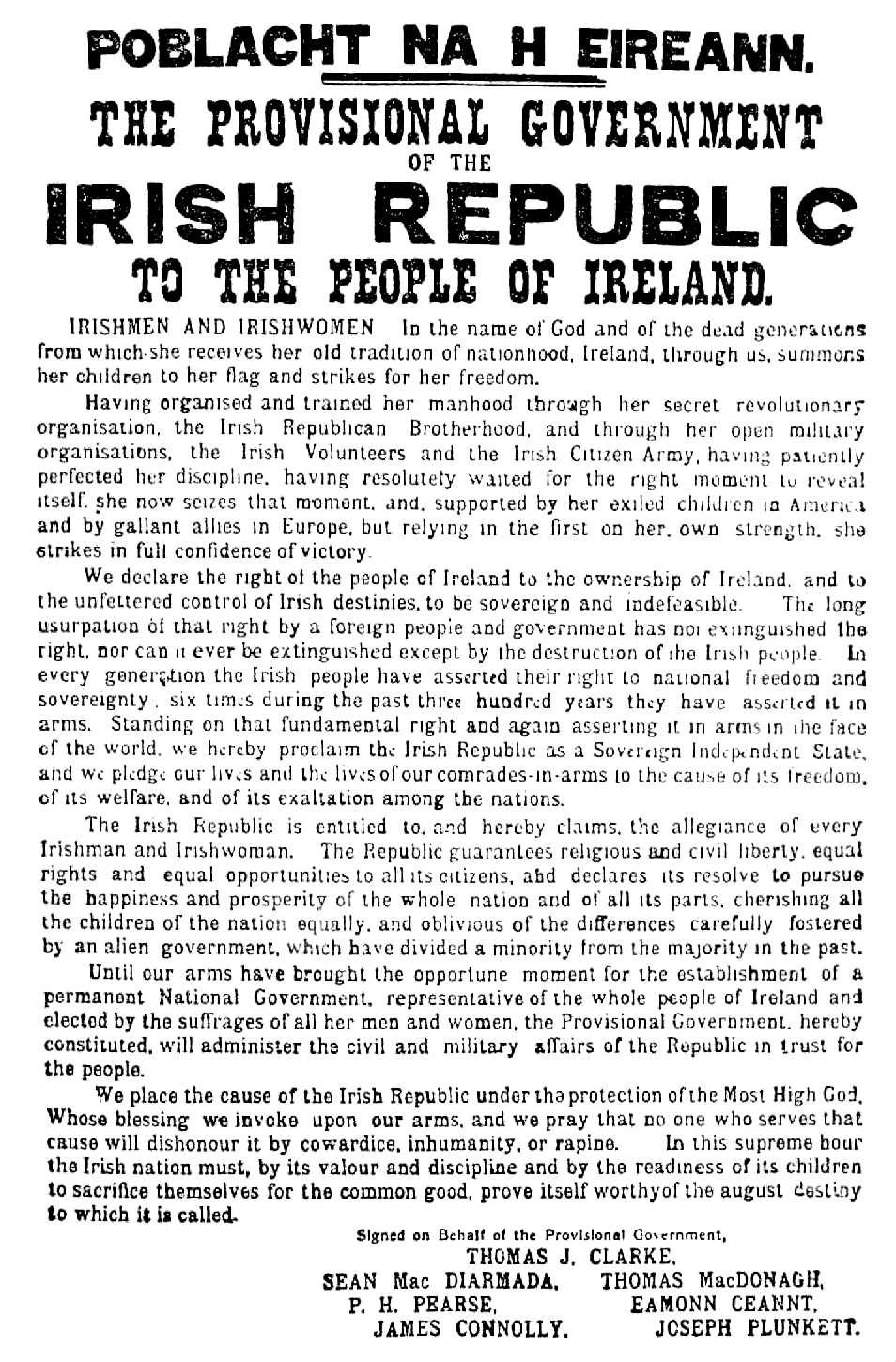
The Proclamation of the Irish Republic was issued during the Easter Rising of April 1916.

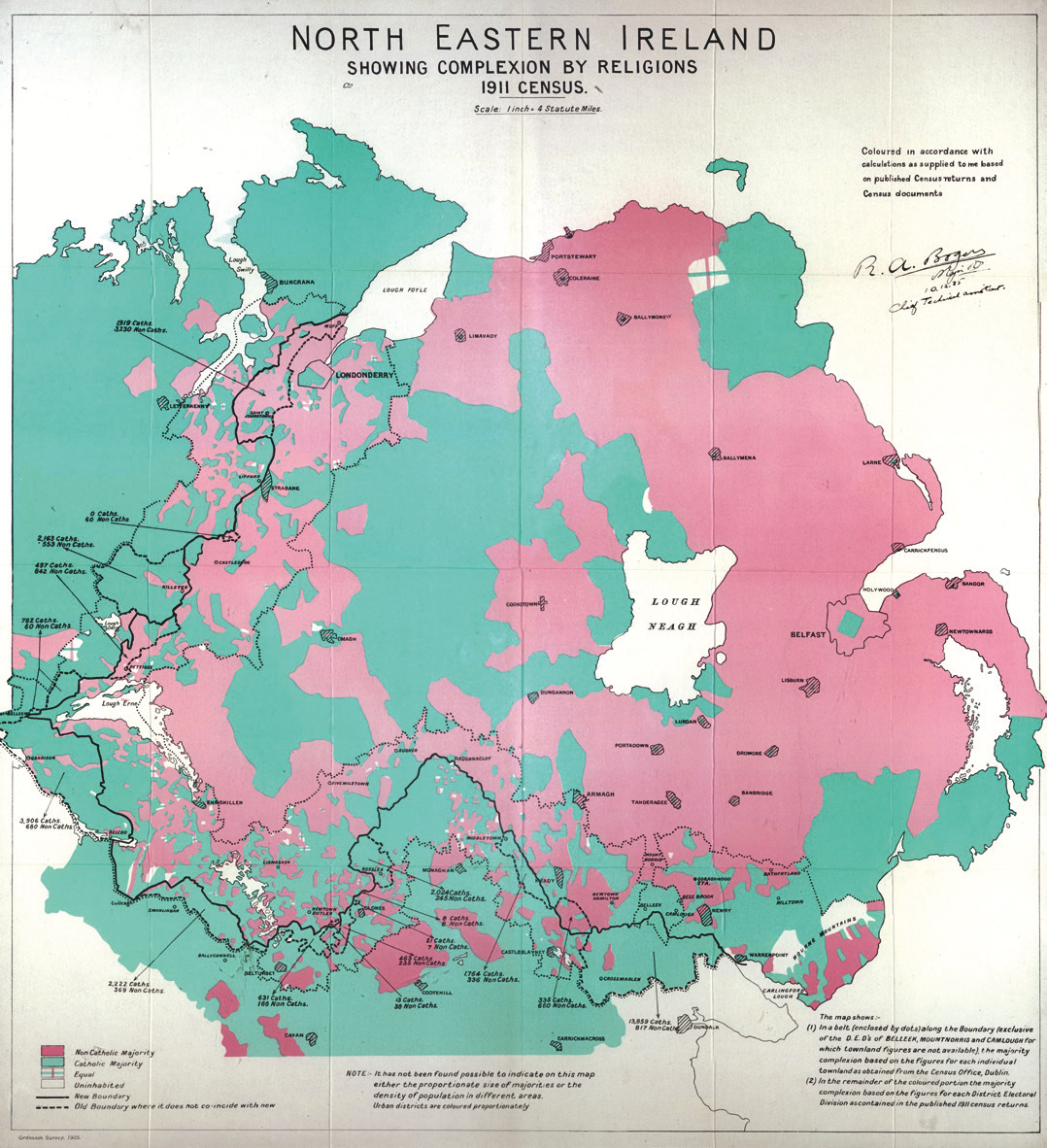
Irish Boundary Commission final report map (1925) shows religious distribution of the population. The green areas signify Catholic majority areas, while the red areas signify non-Catholic majority areas.

By the second decade of the 20th century, Home Rule, or limited Irish self-government, was on the brink of being conceded due to the agitation of the Irish Parliamentary Party. In response to the campaign for Home Rule which started in the 1870s, unionists, mostly Protestant and largely concentrated in Ulster, had resisted both self-government and independence for Ireland, fearing for their future in an overwhelmingly Catholic country dominated by the Roman Catholic Church. In 1912, unionists led by Edward Carson signed the Ulster Covenant and pledged to resist Home Rule by force if necessary. To this end, they formed the paramilitary Ulster Volunteer Force (UVF).

In response, nationalists led by Eoin MacNeill formed the Irish Volunteers in 1913, whose goal was to oppose the UVF and ensure enactment of the Third Home Rule Bill in the event of British or unionist refusal. The outbreak of the First World War in 1914, and Ireland's involvement in the war, temporarily averted possible civil war in Ireland and delayed the resolution of the question of Irish independence. Home Rule, although passed in the British Parliament with Royal Assent, was suspended for the duration of the war.

The Irish Volunteers split, with a majority, known as the National Volunteers, supporting the war effort, and some of them joining Irish regiments of the New British Army. Many of those who stayed were radical nationalists, among them Irish Republican Brotherhood infiltrators. From these ranks came those who launched the Easter Rising in Dublin in 1916, led by Patrick Pearse and James Connolly. Two-and-a-half years after the executions of sixteen of the Rising's leaders, the separatist Sinn Féin party won the December 1918 general election in Ireland with 47% of the vote and a majority of seats, and set up the 1919 First Dáil (Irish Parliament) in Dublin. Their victory was aided by the threat of conscription for First World War service. The Irish War for Independence followed, leading to eventual independence in 1922 for the Irish Free State, which comprised 26 of the 32 Irish counties. In Ulster, particularly in the six counties which became Northern Ireland, Sinn Féin fared relatively poorly in the 1918 election, and unionists won a majority.

The Government of Ireland Act 1920 partitioned the island of Ireland into two separate jurisdictions, Southern Ireland and Northern Ireland, both devolved regions of the United Kingdom. This partition of Ireland was confirmed when the Parliament of Northern Ireland exercised its right in December 1922 under the Anglo-Irish Treaty of 1921 to opt out of the newly established Irish Free State. A part of the treaty signed in 1922 mandated that a boundary commission would sit to decide where the frontier of the northern state would be in relation to its southern neighbour. After the Irish Civil War of 1922–1923, this part of the treaty was given less priority by the new Dublin government led by W. T. Cosgrave, and was quietly dropped. As counties Fermanagh and Tyrone and border areas of Londonderry, Armagh, and Down were mainly nationalist, the Irish Boundary Commission could reduce Northern Ireland to four counties or fewer. In October 1922, the Irish Free State government established the North-Eastern Boundary Bureau, a government office which by 1925 had prepared 56 boxes of files to argue its case for large areas of Northern Ireland to be transferred to the Free State.

Northern Ireland remained a part of the United Kingdom, albeit under a separate system of government whereby it was given its own parliament and devolved government. While this arrangement met the desires of unionists to remain part of the United Kingdom, nationalists largely viewed the partition of Ireland as an illegal and arbitrary division of the island against the will of the majority of its people. They argued that the Northern Ireland state was neither legitimate nor democratic, but created with a deliberately gerrymandered unionist majority. Catholics initially composed about 35% of its population. A total of 557 people, mostly Catholics, were killed in political or sectarian violence from 1920 to 1922 in the six counties that would become Northern Ireland, both during and after the Irish War of Independence. The result was communal strife between Catholics and Protestants, with some historians describing this violence, especially that in Belfast, as a pogrom, although historian Peter Hart argues that the term is not appropriate given the reciprocity of violence in Northern Ireland.

=== 1922–1966 ===
Sir James Craig, 1st Prime Minister of Northern Ireland, who said, "All I boast is that we are a Protestant Parliament and Protestant State"

A marginalised remnant of the Irish Republican Army survived the Irish Civil War. This would come to have a major impact on Northern Ireland. Although the IRA was proscribed on both sides of the new Irish border, it remained ideologically committed to overthrowing both the Northern Ireland and the Free State governments by force of arms to unify Ireland. The government of Northern Ireland passed the Special Powers Act in 1922, giving sweeping powers to the government and police to intern suspects without trial and to administer corporal punishment such as flogging to re-establish or preserve law and order. The Act continued to be used against nationalists long after the violence of this period had come to an end. Various unionist militias were also incorporated into state structures, including the Ulster Special Constabulary (USC), which Allen Feldman argues "emulated the state's fusion of repressive and ideological apparatuses".

In 1920, in local elections held under proportional representation, nationalists had won control over many local governments, including the County Councils of Fermanagh and Tyrone, and the Londonderry Borough Council governing Derry City. In response, in 1922, the new unionist government re-drew the electoral boundaries to give its supporters a disproportionate majority and abolished proportional representation in favour of first past the post voting. This resulted in control by unionists of areas such as Derry City, Fermanagh, and Tyrone, where they were actually a minority of voters.

The two sides' positions became strictly defined following this period. From a unionist perspective, Northern Ireland's nationalists were inherently disloyal and determined to force unionists into a united Ireland. This threat was seen as justifying preferential treatment of unionists in housing, employment, and other fields. The prevalence of larger families and thus the potential for a more rapid population growth among Catholics was seen as a threat. Unionist governments ignored Edward Carson's warning in 1921 that alienating Catholics would make Northern Ireland inherently unstable. After the early 1920s, there were occasional incidents of sectarian unrest in Northern Ireland. These included severe rioting in Belfast in the 1930s and 1950s, and the IRA's brief Northern Campaign in the 1940s and Border Campaign between 1956 and 1962, which did not enjoy broad popular support among nationalists. After the IRA called off its campaign in 1962, Northern Ireland became relatively stable for a few years.

== Late 1960s ==
There is little agreement on the exact date of the start of the Troubles. Different writers have suggested different dates. These include the formation of the modern Ulster Volunteer Force in 1966, the civil rights march in Derry on 5 October 1968, the beginning of the 'Battle of the Bogside' on 12 August 1969, or the deployment of British troops on 14 August 1969. The Northern Ireland Troubles (Legacy and Reconciliation) Act 2023, passed by the Parliament of the United Kingdom, defined the start of the Troubles as 1 January 1966 for the purposes of the act.

=== Civil rights campaign and unionist backlash ===
In March and April 1966, Irish nationalists/republicans held parades throughout Ireland to mark the 50th anniversary of the Easter Rising. On 8 March, a group of Irish republicans dynamited Nelson's Pillar in Dublin. At the time, the IRA was weak and not engaged in armed action, but some unionists warned it was about to be revived to launch another campaign against Northern Ireland. In April 1966, loyalists led by Ian Paisley, a Protestant fundamentalist preacher, founded the Ulster Constitution Defence Committee (UCDC). It set up a paramilitary-style wing called the Ulster Protestant Volunteers (UPV) to oust Terence O'Neill, Prime Minister of Northern Ireland. Although O'Neill was a unionist, they viewed him as being too 'soft' on the civil rights movement and opposed his policies. At the same time, a loyalist group calling itself the Ulster Volunteer Force (UVF) emerged in the Shankill area of Belfast. It was led by Gusty Spence, a former British soldier. Many of its members were also members of the UCDC and UPV. In April and May 1966, the UVF petrol bombed a number of Catholic homes, schools, and businesses. A firebomb killed an elderly Protestant widow, Matilda Gould.

On 21 May 1966, the UVF issued a statement declaring "war" against the IRA and anyone helping it. The UVF fatally shot a Catholic civilian, John Scullion, as he walked home on 27 May. A month later it shot three Catholic civilians as they left a pub, killing Peter Ward, a Catholic from the Falls Road. Shortly after, the UVF was proscribed by the Northern Ireland government. The UVF is still considered a terrorist organisation by the United Kingdom and the Republic of Ireland.

In the mid-1960s, a non-violent civil rights campaign began in Northern Ireland. It comprised groups such as the Northern Ireland Civil Rights Association (NICRA), the Campaign for Social Justice, the Derry Housing Action Committee, and People's Democracy, whose stated goals were:

- an end to job discrimination – it showed evidence that Catholics/nationalists were less likely to be given certain jobs, especially government jobs
- an end to discrimination in housing allocation – it showed evidence that unionist-controlled local councils allocated housing to Protestants ahead of Catholics/nationalists
- one man, one vote – in Northern Ireland, only householders could vote in local elections, while in the rest of the United Kingdom all adults could vote
- an end to gerrymandering of electoral boundaries – this meant that nationalists had less voting power than unionists, even where nationalists were a majority
- reform of the police force (Royal Ulster Constabulary) – it was over 90% Protestant and criticised for sectarianism and police brutality
- repeal of the Special Powers Act – this allowed police to search without a warrant, arrest and imprison people without charge or trial, ban any assemblies or parades, and ban any publications; the Act was used almost exclusively against nationalists.

Some accused NICRA of being a republican front-group whose ultimate goal was to unite Ireland. Although republicans and some members of the IRA (then led by Cathal Goulding and pursuing a non-violent agenda) helped to create and drive the movement, they did not control it and were not a dominant faction within it. (Note: English)

On 20 June 1968, civil rights activists, including nationalist Member of Parliament (MP) Austin Currie, protested against housing discrimination by squatting in a house in Caledon, County Tyrone. The local council had allocated the house to an unmarried 19-year-old Protestant (Emily Beattie, the secretary of a local UUP politician) instead of either of two large Catholic families with children. RUC officers – one of whom was Beattie's brother – forcibly removed the activists. Two days before the protest, the two Catholic families who had been squatting in the house next door were removed by police. Currie had brought their grievance to the local council and to Stormont, but had been told to leave. The incident invigorated the civil rights movement.

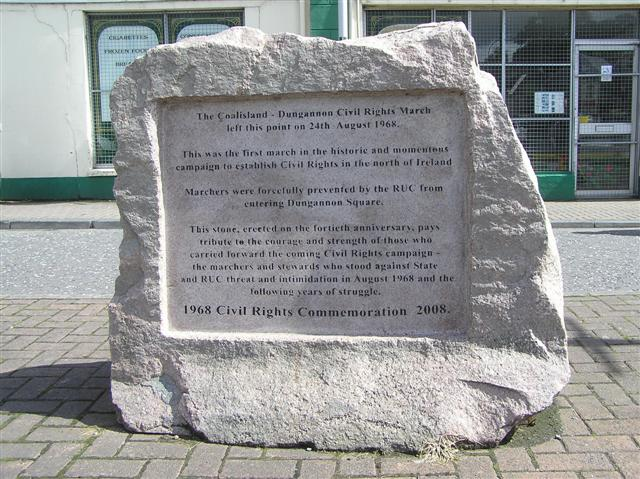
A monument to Northern Ireland's first civil rights march

On 24 August 1968, the civil rights movement held its first civil rights march from Coalisland to Dungannon. Many more marches were held over the following year. Loyalists (especially members of the UPV) attacked some of the marches and held counter-demonstrations in a bid to get the marches banned. Because of the lack of police reaction to the attacks, nationalists saw the RUC, which was almost wholly Protestant, as backing the loyalists and allowing the attacks to occur. On 5 October 1968, a civil rights march in Derry was banned by the Northern Ireland government. When marchers defied the ban, RUC officers surrounded the marchers and beat them indiscriminately and without provocation. More than 100 people were injured, including a number of nationalist politicians. The incident was filmed by television news crews and shown around the world. It caused outrage among Catholics and nationalists, sparking two days of rioting in Derry between nationalists and the RUC.

A few days later, a student civil rights group, People's Democracy, was formed in Belfast. In late November, O'Neill promised the civil rights movement some concessions, but these were seen as too little by nationalists and too much by loyalists. On 1 January 1969, People's Democracy began a four-day march from Belfast to Derry, which was repeatedly harassed and attacked by loyalists. At Burntollet Bridge, the marchers were attacked by about 200 loyalists, including some off-duty police officers, armed with iron bars, bricks, and bottles in a planned ambush. When the march reached Derry City, it was again attacked. The marchers claimed that police did nothing to protect them and that some officers helped the attackers. That night, RUC officers went on a rampage in the Bogside area of Derry, attacking Catholic homes, attacking and threatening residents, and hurling sectarian abuse. Residents then sealed off the Bogside with barricades to keep the police out, creating "Free Derry", which was briefly a no-go area for the security forces.

In March and April 1969, loyalists bombed water and electricity installations in Northern Ireland, blaming them on the dormant IRA and elements of the civil rights movement. Some attacks left much of Belfast without power and water. Loyalists hoped the bombings would force O'Neill to resign and bring an end to any concessions to nationalists. There were six bombings between 30 March and 26 April. All were widely blamed on the IRA, and British soldiers were sent to guard installations. Unionist support for O'Neill waned, and on 28 April he resigned as prime minister.

=== August 1969 riots and aftermath ===
On 19 April, there were clashes between NICRA marchers, the RUC, and loyalists in the Bogside. RUC officers entered the house of Samuel Devenny (42), an uninvolved Catholic civilian, and beat him along with two of his teenage daughters and a family friend. One of the daughters was beaten unconscious as she lay recovering from surgery. Devenny suffered a heart attack and died on 17 July from his injuries. On 13 July, RUC officers beat another Catholic civilian, Francis McCloskey (67), during clashes in Dungiven. He died of his injuries the next day.

On 12 August, the loyalist Apprentice Boys of Derry were allowed to march along the edge of the Bogside. Taunts and missiles were exchanged between the loyalists and nationalist residents. After being bombarded with stones and petrol bombs from nationalists, the RUC, backed by loyalists, tried to storm the Bogside. The RUC used CS gas, armoured vehicles, and water cannons, but were kept at bay by hundreds of nationalists. The continuous fighting, which became known as the Battle of the Bogside, lasted for three days.

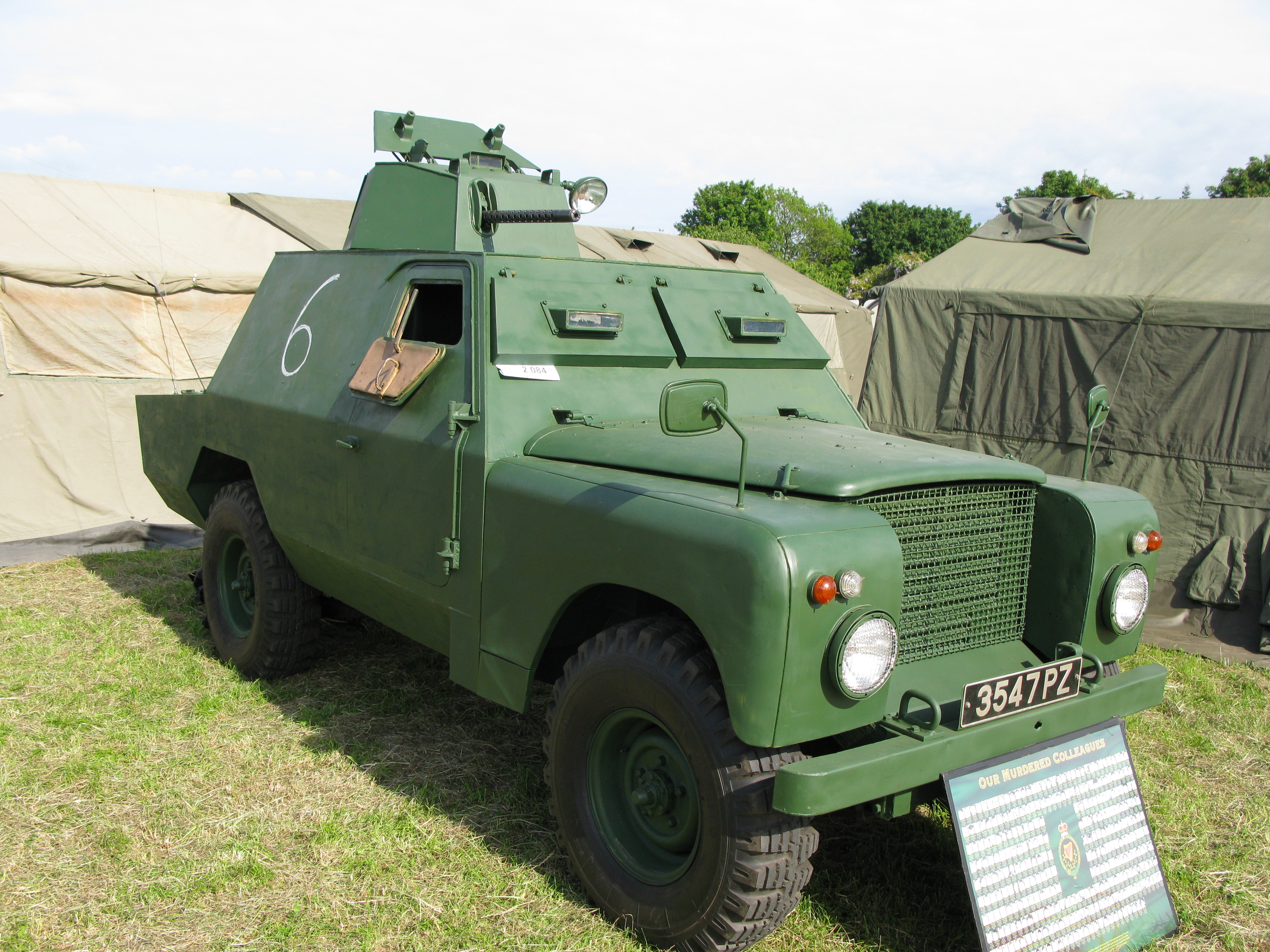
The Royal Ulster Constabulary deployed Shorland armoured cars mounted with heavy Browning machine guns during rioting in Belfast

In response to events in Derry, nationalists held protests at RUC bases in Belfast and elsewhere. Some of these led to clashes with the RUC and attacks on RUC bases. In Belfast, loyalists responded by invading nationalist districts, burning houses and businesses. These sectarian attacks were characterised as the worst assaults on Catholic districts since the 1920s. There were gun battles between nationalists and the RUC and between nationalists and loyalists. A group of about 30 IRA members was involved in the fighting in Belfast. The RUC deployed Shorland armoured cars mounted with heavy Browning machine guns. The Shorlands opened fire on a block of flats in a nationalist district, killing a nine-year-old boy named Patrick Rooney who was shot in the head while asleep in bed by a bullet that passed through two walls. RUC officers opened fire on rioters in Armagh, Dungannon, and Coalisland.

During the riots, on 13 August, Taoiseach Jack Lynch made a television address. He condemned the RUC and said that the Irish Government "can no longer stand by and see innocent people injured and perhaps worse". He called for a United Nations peacekeeping force to be deployed and said that Irish Army field hospitals were being set up at the border in County Donegal near Derry. Lynch added that Irish re-unification would be the only permanent solution. Some interpreted the speech as a threat of military intervention. After the riots, Lynch ordered the Irish Army to plan for a possible humanitarian intervention in Northern Ireland. The plan, Exercise Armageddon, was rejected and remained classified for thirty years.

On 14–15 August, British troops were deployed in Operation Banner in Derry and Belfast to restore order, but did not try to enter the Bogside, bringing a temporary end to the riots. 10 people had been killed, among them Rooney (the first child killed by police during the conflict), and 745 had been injured, including 154 who suffered gunshot wounds. 154 homes and other buildings were demolished and over 400 needed repairs; 83% of the buildings damaged were occupied by Catholics. Between July and 1 September, 505 Catholic and 315 Protestant families were forced to flee their homes. The Irish Army set up refugee camps in the Republic near the border (see Gormanston Camp). Nationalists initially welcomed the British Army, as they did not trust the RUC.

On 9 September, the Northern Ireland Joint Security Committee met at Stormont Castle and decided that

A peace line was to be established to separate physically the Falls and the Shankill communities. Initially this would take the form of a temporary barbed wire fence which would be manned by the Army and the Police ... It was agreed that there should be no question of the peace line becoming permanent although it was acknowledged that the barriers might have to be strengthened in some locations.

On 10 September, the British Army started construction of the first "peace wall". It was the first of many such walls across Northern Ireland, and still stands today.

After the riots, the Hunt Committee was set up to examine the RUC. It published its report on 12 October, recommending that the RUC become an unarmed force and the USC be disbanded. That night, loyalists took to the streets of Belfast in protest at the report. During violence in the Shankill, UVF members shot dead RUC officer Victor Arbuckle. He was the first RUC officer to be killed during the Troubles. In October and December 1969, the UVF carried out a number of small bombings in the Republic of Ireland. (Note: Loyalist violence would persist in the Republic until 1976; thereafter, it occurred sporadically.)

== 1970s ==
=== Violence peaks and Stormont collapses ===
1971 newsreel about the background of the conflict

Despite the British government's attempt to do "nothing that would suggest partiality to one section of the community" and the improvement of the relationship between the Army and the local population following the Army assistance with flood relief in August 1970, the Falls Curfew and a situation that was described at the time as "an inflamed sectarian one, which is being deliberately exploited by the IRA and other extremists" meant that relations between the Catholic population and the British Army rapidly deteriorated.

From 1970 to 1972, an explosion of political violence occurred in Northern Ireland. The deadliest attack in the early 1970s was the McGurk's Bar bombing by the UVF in 1971. The violence peaked in 1972, when nearly 500 people, just over half of them civilians, were killed, the worst year in the entire conflict.

By the end of 1971, 29 barricades were in place in Derry, blocking access to what was known as Free Derry; 16 of these were impassable even to the British Army's one-ton armoured vehicles. Many of the nationalist or republican "no-go areas" were controlled by one of the two factions of the Irish Republican Army – the Provisional IRA and Official IRA. There are several reasons offered for why violence escalated in these years.

Unionists say the main reason was the formation of the Provisional IRA and Official IRA, particularly the former. These two groups were formed when the IRA split into the 'Provisional' and 'Official' factions. While the older IRA had embraced non-violent civil agitation, the new Provisional IRA was determined to wage "armed struggle" against British rule in Northern Ireland. The new IRA was willing to take on the role of "defenders of the Catholic community", rather than seeking working-class ecumenical unity across both communities.

Nationalists point to a number of events in these years to explain the upsurge in violence. One such incident was the Falls Curfew in July 1970, when 3,000 troops imposed a curfew on the nationalist Lower Falls area of Belfast for two days as part of a weapons search, in which four civilians were killed and the army faced sporadic riots and gun battles with the Official IRA, firing over 1500 rounds of ammunition in total. Another was the introduction of internment without trial in 1971 (of 350 initial detainees, none were Protestants). Moreover, due to poor intelligence, very few of those interned were actually republican activists at the time, but some internees became increasingly radicalised as a result of their experiences.

In August 1971, eleven civilians were shot dead in the Ballymurphy massacre in Belfast. They were innocent and the killings were unjustified, according to a 2021 coroner's inquest. Nine victims were shot by the British Army.

=== Bloody Sunday ===
The Bogside massacre, colloquially known as Bloody Sunday, was the shooting dead of thirteen unarmed men by the British Army at a proscribed anti-internment rally in Derry on 30 January 1972 (a fourteenth man died of his injuries some months later), while fifteen other civilians were wounded. The march had been organised by the Northern Ireland Civil Rights Association (NICRA). The soldiers involved were members of the 1st Battalion, Parachute Regiment, also known as "1 Para".

This was one of the most prominent events that occurred during the Troubles as it was recorded as the largest number of civilians killed in a single shooting incident. Bloody Sunday greatly increased the hostility of Catholics and Irish nationalists towards the British military and government while significantly elevating tensions. As a result, the Provisional IRA gained more support, especially through rising numbers of recruits in the local areas.

Following the introduction of internment, there were numerous gun battles between the British Army and both the Provisional and Official IRA. These included the Battle at Springmartin and the Battle of Lenadoon. Between 1971 and 1975, 1,981 people were interned: 1,874 were Catholic/republican, and 107 were Protestant/loyalist. There were widespread allegations of abuse and even torture of detainees, and in 1972, the "five techniques" used by the police and army for interrogation were ruled to be illegal following a British government inquiry.

The Provisional IRA, or "Provos", as they became known, sought to establish themselves as the defender of the nationalist community. The Official IRA (OIRA) began its own armed campaign in reaction to the ongoing violence. The Provisional IRA's offensive campaign began in early 1971 when the Army Council sanctioned attacks on the British Army.

In 1972, the Provisional IRA killed approximately 100 members of the security forces, wounded 500 others, and carried out approximately 1,300 bombings, mostly against commercial targets which they considered "the artificial economy". Their bombing campaign killed many civilians, notably on Bloody Friday on 21 July, when they set off 22 bombs in the centre of Belfast, killing five civilians, two British soldiers, a Royal Ulster Constabulary (RUC) reservist, and an Ulster Defence Association (UDA) member. Ten days later, nine civilians were killed in a triple car bombing in Claudy. The IRA is accused of committing this bombing but no proof for that accusation is yet published.

In 1972, the Official IRA's campaign was largely counter-productive. The Aldershot bombing, an attack on the barracks of the Parachute Regiment in retaliation for Bloody Sunday, killed five female cleaners, a gardener and an army chaplain. The Official IRA killed three soldiers in Derry in April, but Joe McCann was killed by the Parachute Regiment in Belfast during the same month. The Official IRA called off its campaign in May 1972.

British troop concentrations peaked at 1:50 of the civilian population, the highest ratio found in the history of counterinsurgency warfare, higher than that achieved during the "Malayan Emergency"/"Anti-British National Liberation War" to which the conflict is frequently compared. Operation Motorman, the military operation for the surge, was the biggest military operation in Ireland since the Irish War of Independence. In total, almost 22,000 British forces were involved. In the days before 31 July, about 4,000 extra troops were brought into Northern Ireland.

Despite a temporary ceasefire in 1972 and talks with British officials, the Provisionals were determined to continue their campaign until the achievement of a united Ireland. The UK government in London, believing the Northern Ireland administration incapable of containing the security situation, sought to take over the control of law and order there. As this was unacceptable to the Northern Ireland Government, the British government pushed through emergency legislation (the Northern Ireland (Temporary Provisions) Act 1972) which suspended the unionist-controlled Stormont parliament and government, and introduced "direct rule" from London. Direct rule was initially intended as a short-term measure; the medium-term strategy was to restore self-government to Northern Ireland on a basis that was acceptable to both unionists and nationalists. Agreement proved elusive, however, and the Troubles continued throughout the 1970s, 1980s, and the 1990s within a context of political deadlock. The existence of "no-go areas" in Belfast and Derry was a challenge to the authority of the British government in Northern Ireland, and the British Army demolished the barricades and re-established control over the areas in Operation Motorman on 31 July 1972.

=== Sunningdale Agreement and UWC strike ===
Belfast, 1974

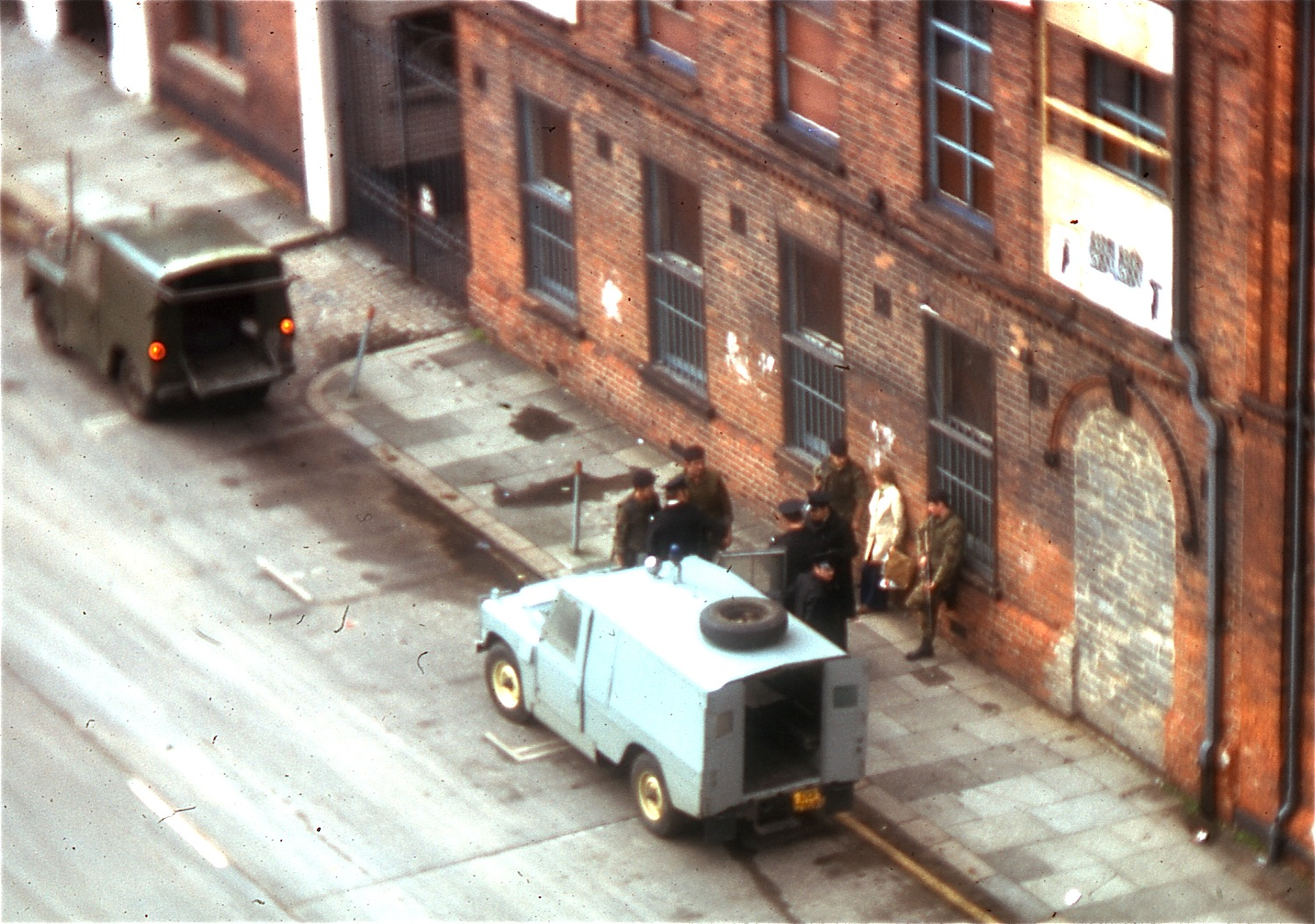
British troops and police investigate a couple behind the Europa Hotel. They were taken away.

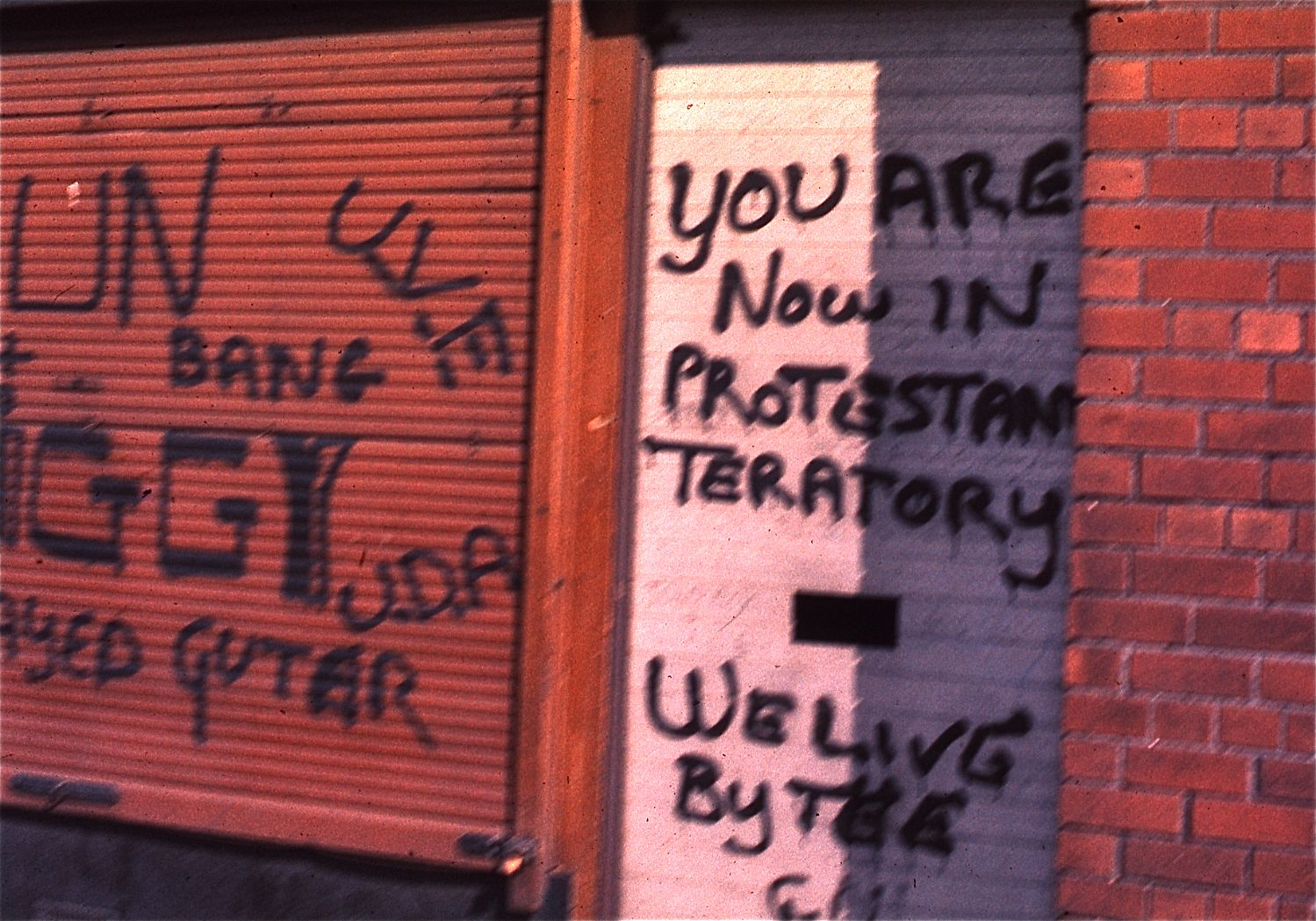
Loyalist graffiti: "You are now in Protestant teratory [sic]"

In June 1973, following the publication of a British White Paper and a referendum in March on the status of Northern Ireland, a new parliamentary body, the Northern Ireland Assembly, was established. Elections to this body were held on 28 June. In October 1973, mainstream nationalist and unionist parties, along with the British and Irish governments, negotiated the Sunningdale Agreement, which was intended to produce a political settlement within Northern Ireland, but with a so-called "Irish dimension" involving the Republic. The agreement provided for "power-sharing" – the creation of an executive containing both unionists and nationalists; and a "Council of Ireland" – a body made up of ministers from Northern Ireland and the Republic that was designed to encourage cross-border co-operation.

Unionists were split over Sunningdale, which was also opposed by the IRA, whose goal remained nothing short of an end to the existence of Northern Ireland as part of the UK. Many unionists opposed the concept of power-sharing, arguing that it was not feasible to share power with nationalists who sought the destruction of the state. Perhaps more significant, however, was the unionist opposition to the "Irish dimension" and the Council of Ireland, which was perceived as being an all-Ireland parliament-in-waiting. Remarks by a young Social Democratic and Labour Party (SDLP) councillor Hugh Logue to an audience at Trinity College Dublin that Sunningdale was the tool "by which the Unionists will be trundled off to a united Ireland" also damaged chances of significant unionist support for the agreement. In January 1974, Brian Faulkner was narrowly deposed as UUP leader and replaced by Harry West, although Faulkner retained his position as Chief Executive in the new government. A UK general election in February 1974 gave the anti-Sunningdale unionists the opportunity to test unionist opinion with the slogan "Dublin is only a Sunningdale away", and the result galvanised their support: they won 11 of the 12 seats, winning 58% of the vote with most of the rest going to nationalists and pro-Sunningdale unionists.

Ultimately, the Sunningdale Agreement was brought down by mass action on the part of loyalist paramilitaries and workers, who formed the Ulster Workers' Council. They organised a general strike, the Ulster Workers' Council strike. This severely curtailed business in Northern Ireland and cut off essential services such as water and electricity. Nationalists argue that the British Government did not do enough to break this strike and uphold the Sunningdale initiative. There is evidence that the strike was further encouraged by MI5, a part of their campaign to 'disorientate' British prime minister Harold Wilson's government (see also Harold Wilson conspiracy theories). Faced with such opposition, the pro-Sunningdale unionists resigned from the power-sharing government and the new regime collapsed. Three days into the UWC strike, on 17 May 1974, two UVF teams from the Belfast and Mid-Ulster brigades detonated three no-warning car bombs in Dublin's city centre during the Friday evening rush hour, resulting in 26 deaths and close to 300 injuries. Ninety minutes later, a fourth car bomb exploded in Monaghan, killing seven additional people. Nobody has ever been convicted for these attacks and the bombings were the greatest loss of life in a single day during the Troubles.

=== Proposal of an independent Northern Ireland ===
Even as his government deployed troops in August 1969, Wilson ordered a secret study of whether the British military could withdraw from Northern Ireland, including all 45 bases, such as the submarine school in Derry. The study concluded that the military could do so in three months, but if increased violence collapsed civil society, Britain would have to send in troops again. Without bases, to do so would be an invasion of Ireland; Wilson thus decided against a withdrawal.

Wilson's cabinet discussed the more drastic step of complete British withdrawal from an independent Northern Ireland as early as February 1969, as one of various possibilities for the region including direct rule. He wrote in 1971 that Britain had "responsibility without power" there, and secretly met with the IRA that year while leader of the opposition; his government in late 1974 and early 1975 again met with the IRA to negotiate a ceasefire. During the meetings, the parties discussed complete British withdrawal. Although the British government publicly stated that troops would stay as long as necessary, widespread fear from the Birmingham pub bombings and other IRA attacks in Britain itself increased support among MPs and the public for a military withdrawal.

The failure of Sunningdale and the effectiveness of the UWC strike against British authority were more evidence to Wilson of his 1971 statement. They led to the serious consideration in London of independence until November 1975. Had the withdrawal occurred – which Wilson supported but others, including James Callaghan, opposed – the region would have become a separate dominion. According to the secret plan, codenamed "Doomsday", Britain would have had as little to do with the new "Ulster Dominion" as possible, with financial subsidies ending within five years. It would not have been an associated state, with Britain in control only of foreign relations, because a war between Ulster and the Republic would involve Britain. The dominion would also not have been a member of the British Commonwealth. The Northern Ireland Office cited the 1948 Newfoundland referendums – in which the island voluntarily joined Canada, its larger neighbour – as an example that divided Ireland might hopefully follow.

The British negotiations with the IRA, an illegal organisation, angered the Republic's government. It did not know what was discussed but feared that the British were considering abandoning Northern Ireland. Irish Foreign Minister Garret FitzGerald discussed in a memorandum of June 1975 the possibilities of orderly withdrawal and independence, repartition of the island, or a collapse of Northern Ireland into civil war and anarchy. The memorandum preferred a negotiated independence as the best of the three "worst case scenarios", but concluded that the Irish government could do little.

The Irish government had already failed to prevent a crowd from the burning of British Embassy, Dublin in 1972. It believed that Ireland could not enlarge the country's small army of 12,500 men without negative consequences. A civil war in Northern Ireland would cause many deaths there and severe consequences for the Republic, as the public would demand that it intervene to protect nationalists. FitzGerald warned Callaghan that the failure to intervene, despite Ireland's inability to do so, would "threaten democratic government in the Republic", which would jeopardise British and European security against communist and other foreign nations.

Wilson's aides had in 1969 come to a similar conclusion, telling him that removing Northern Ireland from the United Kingdom would cause violence and a military intervention by the Republic that would not allow the removal of British troops. Loyalist leader Glen Barr said in 2008 that a British withdrawal would have caused civil war, as loyalists would have expected the Republic to invade Northern Ireland. Peter Ramsbotham, British Ambassador to the United States, warned of a hostile American reaction.

Wilson's desire to extricate the British government from Northern Ireland was ultimately stymied by the fear that doing so might lead to catastrophe. The Irish government so dreaded the consequences that FitzGerald refused to ask Britain not to withdraw – as he feared that openly discussing the issue could permit the British to proceed – and other members of government opposed the Irish cabinet even discussing what FitzGerald referred to as a "doomsday scenario". He wrote in 2006 that "Neither then nor since has public opinion in Ireland realised how close to disaster our whole island came during the last two years of Harold Wilson's premiership"; in 2008, he said that the Republic "was more at risk then than at any time since our formation".

=== Mid-1970s ===
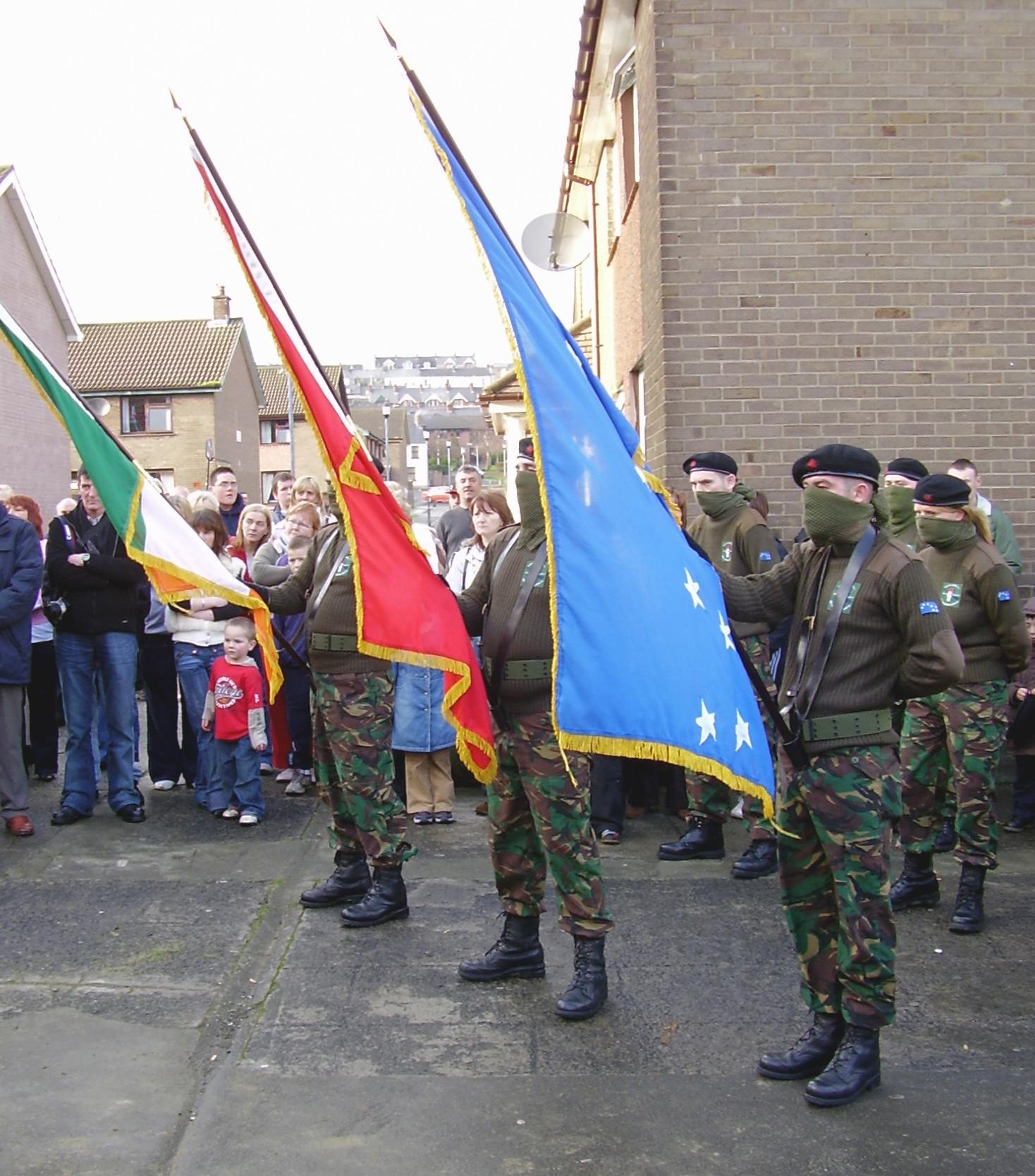
The Irish National Liberation Army began operations in the mid-1970s.

In February 1974, an IRA time bomb killed 12 people on a coach on the M62 in the West Yorkshire. Merlyn Rees, the Secretary of State for Northern Ireland, lifted the proscription against the UVF in April 1974. In December, a month after the Birmingham pub bombings killed 21 people, the IRA declared a ceasefire; this would theoretically last throughout most of the following year. The ceasefire notwithstanding, sectarian killings escalated in 1975, along with internal feuding between rival paramilitary groups. This made 1975 one of the "bloodiest years of the conflict".

On 7 August 1974, a 24-year-old man from Limehill near Pomeroy, County Tyrone was shot in the back and killed by a member of the British Army (First Battalion, Royal Regiment of Wales). At the first inquest the soldier was cleared of all charges but in 2020 another inquest was ordered by the Attorney General. The inquest was the first in a series of coroners' inquiries into deaths associated with the Troubles. The coroner ruled that the killing of Paddy McElhone was unjustified with a judge stating "an innocent man shot in cold blood without warning when he was no threat to anyone". The McElhone family issued a statement reading in part: "Our family always knew that Paddy was an innocent young man, taken from his home and shot by a British soldier for no reason". The statement also said that his parents "went to their graves broken-hearted knowing that their innocent son had been killed, without justification, explanation or apology".

On 5 April 1975, Irish republican paramilitary members killed a UDA volunteer and four Protestant civilians in a gun and bomb attack at the Mountainview Tavern on the Shankill Road, Belfast. The attack was claimed by the Republican Action Force believed to be a covername used by Provisional IRA (IRA) volunteers.

On 31 July 1975 at Buskhill, outside Newry, popular Irish cabaret band the Miami Showband was returning home to Dublin after a gig in Banbridge when it was ambushed by gunmen from the UVF Mid-Ulster Brigade wearing British Army uniforms at a bogus military roadside checkpoint on the main A1 road. Three of the bandmembers, two Catholics and a Protestant, were shot dead, while two of the UVF men were killed when the bomb they had loaded onto the band's minibus detonated prematurely. The following January, eleven Protestant workers were gunned down in Kingsmill, South Armagh after having been ordered off their bus by an armed republican gang, which called itself the South Armagh Republican Action Force. This resulted in 10 fatalities, with one man surviving despite being shot 18 times. These killings were reportedly in retaliation to a loyalist double shooting attack against the Reavey and O'Dowd families the previous night.

The violence continued through the rest of the 1970s. This included a series of attacks in Southern England in 1974 and 1975 by Provisional IRA active service unit the Balcombe Street Gang. The British Government reinstated the ban against the UVF in October 1975, making it once more an illegal organisation. The Provisional IRA's December 1974 ceasefire officially ended in January 1976, although it had carried out several attacks in 1975. The Provisional IRA had lost the hope it had felt in the early 1970s that it could force a rapid British withdrawal from Northern Ireland, and instead developed a strategy known as the "Long War", which involved a less intense but more sustained campaign of violence that could continue indefinitely. The Official IRA ceasefire of 1972, however, became permanent, and the "Official" movement eventually evolved into the Workers' Party, which rejected violence completely. However, a splinter from the "Officials" – the Irish National Liberation Army – continued a campaign of violence beginning in 1974.

=== Late 1970s ===
By the late 1970s, war-weariness was visible in both communities. One sign of this was the formation of the Peace People, which won the Nobel Peace Prize in 1976. The Peace People organised large demonstrations calling for an end to paramilitary violence. Their campaign lost momentum, however, after they appealed to the nationalist community to provide information on the IRA to security forces.

In February 1978, the IRA bombed La Mon, a hotel restaurant in Comber, County Down. The decade ended with a double attack by the IRA against the British. On 27 August 1979, Lord Mountbatten, while on holiday in Mullaghmore, County Sligo, was killed by a bomb planted on board his boat. Three other people were also killed: Lady Brabourne, the elderly mother of Mountbatten's son-in-law; and two teenagers, a grandson of Mountbatten and a local boatman. That same day, 18 British soldiers, mostly members of the Parachute Regiment, were killed by two remote-controlled bombs in the Warrenpoint ambush at Narrow Water Castle, near Warrenpoint, County Down. It was the British Army's largest loss of life in a single incident in Operation Banner.

Successive British governments, having failed to achieve a political settlement, tried to "normalise" Northern Ireland. Aspects included the removal of internment without trial and the removal of political status for paramilitary prisoners. From 1972 onward, paramilitaries were tried in juryless Diplock courts to avoid intimidation of jurors. On conviction, they were to be treated as ordinary criminals. Resistance to this policy among republican prisoners led to more than 500 of them in the Maze prison initiating the "blanket" and "dirty" protests. Their protests culminated in hunger strikes in 1980 and 1981, aimed at the restoration of political status, as well as other concessions.

== 1980s ==
In the 1981 Irish hunger strike, 10 republican prisoners (seven from the Provisional IRA and three from the INLA) died of starvation. The first hunger striker to die, Bobby Sands, was elected to Parliament on an Anti-H-Block ticket, as was his election agent Owen Carron following Sands's death. The hunger strikes resonated among many nationalists; over 100,000 people attended Sands's funeral mass in West Belfast and thousands attended those of the other hunger strikers. From an Irish republican perspective, the significance of these events was to demonstrate potential for a political and electoral strategy.

In the wake of the hunger strikes, Sinn Féin, which had become the Provisional IRA's political wing, began to contest elections for the first time in both Northern Ireland (as abstentionists) and in the Republic. In 1986, Sinn Féin recognised the legitimacy of the Irish Dáil, which caused a small group of members to break away and form Republican Sinn Féin.

The IRA's "Long War" was boosted by large donations of arms from Libya in the 1980s (see Provisional IRA arms importation) partly due to Muammar Gaddafi's anger at British Prime Minister Margaret Thatcher's government for assisting the Reagan government's 1986 bombing of Libya, which had allegedly killed one of Gaddafi's children. Additionally, it received funding from supporters in the Republic of Ireland and the United States and elsewhere throughout the Irish diaspora. Loyalist paramilitaries also received significant funding and arms from supporters in Canada and Scotland.

The Hyde Park bombing memorial in London.

In July 1982, the IRA bombed military ceremonies in London's Hyde Park and Regent's Park, killing four soldiers, seven bandsmen, and seven horses. The INLA was highly active in the early and mid-1980s. In December 1982, it bombed a disco in Ballykelly, County Londonderry, frequented by off-duty British soldiers, killing 11 soldiers and six civilians. In December 1983, the IRA attacked Harrods using a car bomb, killing six people. One of the IRA's most high-profile actions in this period was the Brighton hotel bombing on 12 October 1984, when it set off a 100-pound time bomb in the Grand Brighton Hotel in Brighton, where politicians including Thatcher were staying for the Conservative Party conference. The bomb, which exploded in the early hours of the morning, killed five people, including Conservative MP Sir Anthony Berry, and injured 34 others.

Provisional IRA soldiers in 1994

On 28 February 1985 in Newry, nine RUC officers were killed in a mortar attack on the police station. It was planned by the IRA's South Armagh Brigade and an IRA unit in Newry. Nine shells were fired from a mark 10 mortar which was bolted onto the back of a hijacked Ford van in Crossmaglen. Eight shells overshot the station; the ninth hit a portable cabin which was being used as a canteen. It was the RUC's largest loss of life during the Troubles. On 8 May 1987, eight IRA members attacked an RUC station in Loughgall, County Armagh, using a bomb and guns. All were killed by the SAS – the most IRA members killed in a single incident in the Troubles. On 8 November 1987 in Enniskillen, County Fermanagh, a Provisional IRA time bomb exploded during a Remembrance Sunday ceremony for UK Commonwealth war casualties. The bomb went off near a cenotaph that was at the heart of the parade. Eleven people (ten civilians and one serving member of the RUC) were killed and 63 were injured. Former school headmaster Ronnie Hill was seriously injured in the bombing and slipped into a coma two days later, remaining in this condition for more than a decade before his death in December 2000. The unit that carried out the bombing was disbanded. Loyalist paramilitaries responded to the bombing with revenge attacks on Catholics, mostly civilians. Another bomb had been planted at nearby Tullyhommon at a parallel Remembrance Day commemoration but failed to detonate.

March 1988 saw a wave of violence starting with the shooting dead of three IRA volunteers who were planning a bombing by the SAS at a Shell petrol station on Winston Churchill Avenue in Gibraltar, the British Overseas Territory attached to the south of Spain. This became known as Operation Flavius. Their funeral at Milltown Cemetery in Belfast was attacked by Michael Stone, a UDA member who threw grenades as the coffin was lowered and shot at people who chased him. Stone killed three people, including IRA volunteer Kevin Brady. Stone was jailed for life the following year, but was freed 11 years later under the Good Friday Agreement. Two British Army corporals, David Howes and Derek Wood, who were in plain clothes, drove their car into Brady's funeral cortege in Andersonstown. The crowd assumed the soldiers were loyalists intent on repeating Stone's attack; dozens of people surrounded and attacked their car. The soldiers were pulled out of their car, kidnapped and shot dead by the IRA. This became known as the Corporals killings.

In September 1989, the IRA used a time bomb to attack the Royal Marine Depot, Deal in Kent, killing 11 bandsmen.

Towards the end of the decade, the British Army tried to soften its public appearance to residents in communities such as Derry to improve relations between the local community and the military. Soldiers were told not to use the telescopic sights on their rifles to scan the streets, as civilians believed they were being aimed at. Soldiers were also encouraged to wear berets when manning checkpoints (and later other situations) rather than helmets, which were perceived as militaristic and hostile. The system of complaints was overhauled – previously, if civilians believed they were being harassed or abused by soldiers in the streets or during searches and made a complaint, they would never find out what action (if any) was taken. The new regulations required an officer to visit the complainants house to inform them of the outcome of their complaint.

In the 1980s, loyalist paramilitary groups—the Ulster Volunteer Force, the Ulster Defence Association, and Ulster Resistance—imported arms and explosives from South Africa. The weapons obtained were divided between the groups, although some of the weaponry (such as rocket-propelled grenades) were hardly used. In 1987, the Irish People's Liberation Organisation (IPLO), a breakaway faction of the INLA, engaged in a bloody feud against the INLA which weakened the INLA's presence in some areas. By 1992, the IPLO was destroyed by the Provisionals for its involvement in drug dealing, thus ending the feud.

== 1990s ==
=== Escalation in South Armagh ===
The IRA's South Armagh Brigade had made the countryside village of Crossmaglen their stronghold since the 1970s. The surrounding villages of Silverbridge, Cullyhanna, Cullaville, Forkhill, Jonesborough, and Creggan were also IRA strongholds. In February 1978, a British Army Gazelle helicopter was shot down near Silverbridge, killing Lieutenant Colonel Ian Corden-Lloyd.

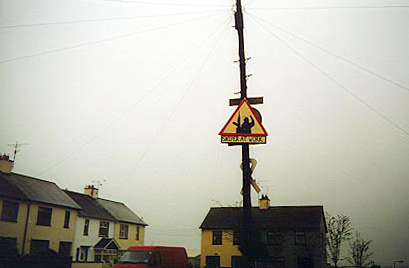
'Sniper at Work' sign in Crossmaglen

In the 1990s, the IRA came up with a new plan to restrict British Army foot patrols near Crossmaglen. They developed two sniper teams to attack British Army and RUC patrols. They usually fired from an improvised armoured car using a .50 BMG calibre M82 sniper rifle. Signs were put up around South Armagh reading "Sniper at Work". The snipers killed a total of nine members of the security forces: seven soldiers and two constables. The last to be killed before the Good Friday Agreement was a British soldier, bombardier Steven Restorick.

The IRA had developed the capacity to attack helicopters in South Armagh and elsewhere since the 1980s, including the 1990 shootdown of a Gazelle flying over the border between counties Tyrone and Monaghan by the East Tyrone Brigade; there were no fatalities in any of those incidents.

Another incident involving British helicopters in South Armagh was the Battle of Newry Road in September 1993. Two other helicopters, a British Army Lynx and a Royal Air Force Puma were shot down by improvised mortar fire in 1994. The IRA set up checkpoints in South Armagh during this period, which were unchallenged by the security forces.

=== Downing Street mortar attack ===
Police officers looking at a burned van used by the IRA in the 1991 mortar attack on 10 Downing Street

On 7 February 1991, the IRA attempted to assassinate prime minister John Major and his war cabinet by firing a mortar at 10 Downing Street while they were gathered there to discuss the Gulf War. The shelling caused only four injuries, two of which were to police officers, while Major and the entire war cabinet were unharmed.

=== First ceasefire ===
After a prolonged period of background political manoeuvring, during which the 1992 Baltic Exchange and 1993 Bishopsgate bombings occurred in London, both loyalist and republican paramilitary groups declared ceasefires in 1994. The year leading up to the ceasefires included a mass shooting in Castlerock, County Londonderry, in which four people were killed. The IRA responded with the Shankill Road bombing in October 1993, which aimed to kill the UDA leadership, but instead killed eight Protestant civilian shoppers and a low-ranking UDA member, as well as one of the perpetrators, who was killed when the bomb detonated prematurely. The UDA responded with attacks in nationalist areas including a mass shooting in Greysteel, in which eight civilians were killed – six Catholics and two Protestants.

On 16 June 1994, just before the ceasefires, the Irish National Liberation Army killed three UVF members in a gun attack on the Shankill Road. In revenge, three days later the UVF killed six civilians in a shooting at a pub in Loughinisland, County Down. The IRA, in the remaining month before its ceasefire, killed four senior loyalist paramilitaries, three from the UDA and one from the UVF. On 31 August 1994, the IRA declared a ceasefire. The loyalist paramilitaries, temporarily united in the "Combined Loyalist Military Command", reciprocated six weeks later. Although these ceasefires failed in the short run, they marked an effective end to large-scale political violence, as they paved the way for the final ceasefires.

In 1995, the United States appointed George J. Mitchell as the United States Special Envoy for Northern Ireland. Mitchell was recognised as being more than a token envoy and as representing a President (Bill Clinton) with a deep interest in events. The British and Irish governments agreed that Mitchell would chair an international commission on disarmament of paramilitary groups.

=== Second ceasefire ===
On 9 February 1996, less than two years after the declaration of the ceasefire, the IRA revoked it with the Docklands bombing in the Canary Wharf area of London, killing two people, injuring 39 others, and causing £85 million in damage to the city's financial centre. Sinn Féin blamed the failure of the ceasefire on the British Government's refusal to begin all-party negotiations until the IRA decommissioned its weapons.

An IRA signpost with the word "Provoland" underneath in Omagh, County Tyrone

The attack was followed by several more, most notably the 1996 Manchester bombing, which destroyed a large area of the centre of the city on 15 June. It was the largest bomb attack in Britain since World War II. While the attack avoided any fatalities due to a telephone warning and the rapid response of the emergency services, over 200 people were injured in the attack, many of them outside the established cordon. The damage caused by the blast was estimated at £411 million. Lance bombardier Stephen Restorick, the last British soldier killed during the Troubles, was shot dead at a checkpoint on the Green Rd near Bessbrook on 12 February 1997 by the IRA's South Armagh sniper.

The IRA reinstated their ceasefire in July 1997, as negotiations for the document that became known as the Good Friday Agreement began without Sinn Féin. In September of the same year, Sinn Féin signed the Mitchell Principles and were admitted to the talks. The UVF was the first paramilitary grouping to split as a result of their ceasefire, spawning the Loyalist Volunteer Force (LVF) in 1996. In December 1997, the INLA assassinated LVF leader Billy Wright, leading to a series of revenge killings by loyalist groups. A group split from the Provisional IRA and formed the Real IRA (RIRA).

In August 1998, a Real IRA bomb in Omagh killed 29 civilians, the most by a single bomb during the Troubles. This bombing discredited "dissident republicans" and their campaigns in the eyes of many who had previously supported the Provisionals' campaign. They became small groups with little influence, but still capable of violence.

The INLA also declared a ceasefire after the Good Friday Agreement. Since then, most paramilitary violence has been directed at their "own" communities and at other factions within their organisations. The UDA, for example, has feuded with their fellow loyalists the UVF on two occasions since 2000. There have been internal struggles for power between "brigade commanders" and involvement in organised crime.

=== Political process ===
After the ceasefires, talks began between the main political parties in Northern Ireland to establish political agreement. These talks led to the Good Friday Agreement of 1998. This Agreement restored self-government to Northern Ireland on the basis of "power-sharing". In 1999, an executive was formed consisting of the four main parties, including Sinn Féin. Other important changes included the reform of the RUC, renamed as the Police Service of Northern Ireland, which was required to recruit at least a 50% quota of Catholics for ten years, and the removal of Diplock courts under the Justice and Security (Northern Ireland) Act 2007.

A security normalisation process also began as part of the treaty, which comprised the progressive closing of redundant British Army barracks, border observation towers, and the withdrawal of all forces taking part in Operation Banner – including the resident battalions of the Royal Irish Regiment – that would be replaced by an infantry brigade, deployed in ten sites around Northern Ireland but with no operative role in the province.

The power-sharing Executive and Assembly were suspended in 2002, when unionists withdrew following "Stormontgate", a controversy over allegations of an IRA spy ring operating at Stormont. There were ongoing tensions about the Provisional IRA's failure to disarm fully and sufficiently quickly. IRA decommissioning has since been completed (in September 2005) to the satisfaction of most parties.

A feature of Northern Ireland politics since the Agreement has been eclipsed in electoral terms of parties such as the SDLP and Ulster Unionist Party (UUP) by rival parties such as Sinn Féin and the DUP. Similarly, although political violence is greatly reduced, sectarian animosity has not disappeared. Residential areas are more segregated between Catholic nationalists and Protestant unionists than ever. Thus, progress towards restoring the power-sharing institutions was slow and tortuous. On 8 May 2007, devolved government returned to Northern Ireland. DUP leader Ian Paisley and Sinn Féin's Martin McGuinness took office as First Minister and deputy First Minister, respectively.

== Support outside Northern Ireland ==
=== Arms importation ===
Both Republican and Loyalist paramilitaries sought to obtain weapons outside of Northern Ireland to achieve their objectives. Irish Republican paramilitaries received the vast majority of external support. Over the years, the Provisional IRA imported arms from external sources such as sympathisers in the Republic of Ireland, Irish diaspora communities within the Anglosphere, mainland Europe, the Palestine Liberation Organization, and Libyan leader Muammar Gaddafi. The Soviet Union and North Korea supplied the Official IRA with 5,000 weapons, and the INLA received considerable arms from overseas as well.

The IRA's primary external support was from the Republic of Ireland, whose safe haven allowed the group to raise legal and illegal funds, organise and train, and manufacture a large number of firearms and explosives with ease and then smuggled them into Northern Ireland and England. The IRA's primary weapon in the Republic was explosives (including gelignite and ANFO), which were responsible for the vast majority of the bombings in Northern Ireland and England throughout the conflict. While the plastic explosive Semtex donated by Gaddafi was appreciated and infamous in IRA bombing campaigns, they were actually sparsely used. Notable events of IRA bombs of Irish origin included Bloody Friday, the Warrenpoint ambush, the assassination of Lord Mountbatten, and the Hyde Park and Regent's Park bombings.

Loyalist paramilitaries also received support, mainly from Protestant supporters in Canada, England, and Scotland (including members of the Orange Order). From 1979 to 1986, loyalist paramilitaries imported up to 100 machine guns and "as many rifles, grenade launchers, magnum revolvers and hundreds of thousands of rounds of ammunition from Canada." Members of the Grand Orange Lodge of Scotland sent gelignite explosives to UDA and UVF members. British Army's Force Research Unit (FRU) agent Brian Nelson also secured a large amount of weaponry from the South African government to loyalists.

=== Funding ===
Irish Republican and Loyalist militants also received significant funding from groups, individuals, and state actors outside Northern Ireland. From the 1970s to the early 1990s, Libya gave the IRA over $12.5 million in cash (equivalent to $48.8 million in 2025). The IRA also received at least $2 million from the Revolutionary Armed Forces of Colombia (FARC) in exchange for training them with bomb techniques, including shaped charges, propane bombs, landmines, and the construction of mortars (see also the Colombia Three). On the Loyalist side, the Northern Ireland Affairs Select Committee report of June 2002 stated that "in 1992 it was estimated that Scottish support for the UDA and UVF might amount to £100,000 a year."

In the Anglosphere outside Great Britain, Irish Americans, Irish Canadians, Irish Australians, and Irish New Zealanders provided considerable or substantial financial donations to the Republican movement, mostly the Provisionals. The financial backbone of the Provisional cause in America was the Irish Northern Aid Committee (NORAID), which was estimated to have raised $3.6 million between 1970 and 1991, including for supporting families of dead or imprisoned IRA members, lobbying and propaganda efforts, and sometimes purchasing weapons for the Provisional IRA. In Australia, officials estimated that by the 1990s, no more than A$20,000 were raised annually for the Provisionals. Canadian supporters raised money to secretly purchase weapons, notably detonators used for Canadian mining sites and smuggled to the IRA.

However, nearly all or the vast majority of the funding for both Republican and Loyalist paramilitaries came from criminal and business activities within the island of Ireland and Great Britain. The Northern Ireland Affairs Select Committee report of June 2002 stated that:

Historically, the vast majority of paramilitary funds for both Republican and Loyalist groups have been generated within Northern Ireland. The primary reason for this is the relative ease of raising funds within these communities. Sympathy for the cause is greatest within the originating community. Those concerned also have the local knowledge which facilitates crime or the direct intimidation of individuals from whom money is sought. The fact that Northern Ireland remains predominantly a cash economy also encourages a local focus, as it facilitates money laundering and makes it difficult for the law enforcement agencies to trace transactions.

== Collusion between security forces and paramilitaries ==
There were many incidents of collusion between the British state security forces (the British Army and RUC) and loyalist paramilitaries. This included soldiers and policemen taking part in loyalist attacks while off-duty, giving weapons and intelligence to loyalists, not taking action against loyalists, and hindering police investigations. The De Silva Report found that, during the 1980s, 85% of the intelligence loyalists used to target people came from the security forces, who in turn also had double agents and informers within loyalist groups who organised attacks on the orders of or with the knowledge of their handlers. Of the 210 loyalists arrested by the Stevens Inquiries team, all but three were found to be state agents or informers.

The British Army's locally recruited Ulster Defence Regiment (UDR) was almost wholly Protestant. Despite recruits being vetted, some loyalist militants managed to enlist, mainly to obtain weapons, training, and information. A 1973 British Government document (uncovered in 2004), Subversion in the UDR, suggested that 5–15% of UDR soldiers then were members of loyalist paramilitaries. The report said the UDR was the main source of weapons for those groups, although by 1973, UDR weapons losses had dropped significantly, partly due to stricter controls. In 1977, the Army investigated a UDR battalion based at Girdwood Barracks, Belfast. The investigation found that 70 soldiers had links to the UVF, that thirty soldiers had fraudulently diverted up to £47,000 to the UVF, and that UVF members socialised with soldiers in their mess. Following this, two UDR members were dismissed. The investigation was halted after a senior officer claimed it was harming morale. By 1990, at least 197 UDR soldiers had been convicted of loyalist terrorist offences and other serious crimes, including 19 convicted of murder. This was only a small fraction of those who served in the UDR, but the proportion was higher than the regular British Army, the RUC, and the civilian population.

During the 1970s, the Glenanne gang – a secret alliance of loyalist militants, British soldiers, and RUC officers – carried out a string of gun and bomb attacks against nationalists in an area of Northern Ireland known as the "murder triangle". It also carried out some attacks in the Republic, killing about 120 people in total, mostly uninvolved civilians. The Cassel Report investigated 76 murders attributed to the group and found evidence that soldiers and policemen were involved in 74 of those. One member, RUC officer John Weir, claimed his superiors knew of the collusion but allowed it to continue. The Cassel Report also stated some senior officers knew of the crimes but did nothing to prevent, investigate, or punish perpetrators. Attacks attributed to the group include the Dublin and Monaghan bombings (1974), the Miami Showband killings (1975), and the Reavey and O'Dowd killings (1976).

The Stevens Inquiries found that elements of the security forces had used loyalists as "proxies" who, via double-agents and informers, had helped loyalist groups to kill targeted individuals, usually suspected republicans but also civilians both intentionally and otherwise. The inquiries concluded this had intensified and prolonged the conflict. The British Army's Force Research Unit (FRU) was the main agency involved. Brian Nelson, the UDA's chief 'intelligence officer', was a FRU agent. Through Nelson, FRU helped loyalists target people for assassination. FRU commanders say they helped loyalists target only suspected or known republican activists and prevented the killing of civilians. The Inquiries found evidence only two lives were saved and that Nelson/FRU was responsible for at least 30 murders and many other attacks, many on civilians. One victim was solicitor Pat Finucane. Nelson also supervised the shipping of weapons to loyalists in 1988. From 1992 to 1994, loyalists were responsible for more deaths than republicans, partly due to FRU involvement. Members of the security forces tried to obstruct the Stevens investigation.

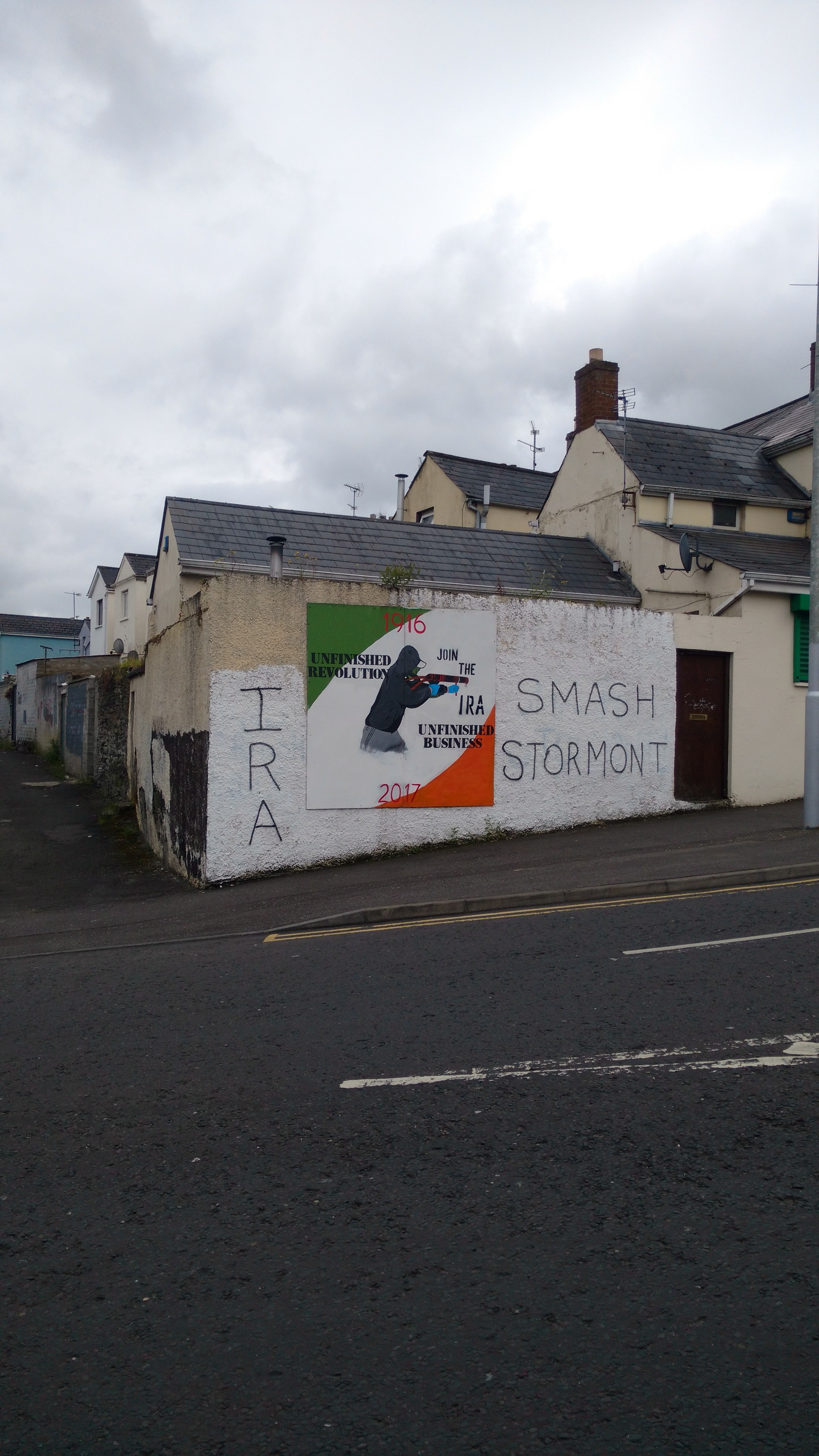
Mural in a Catholic Neighbourhood in Derry, taken in June 2017

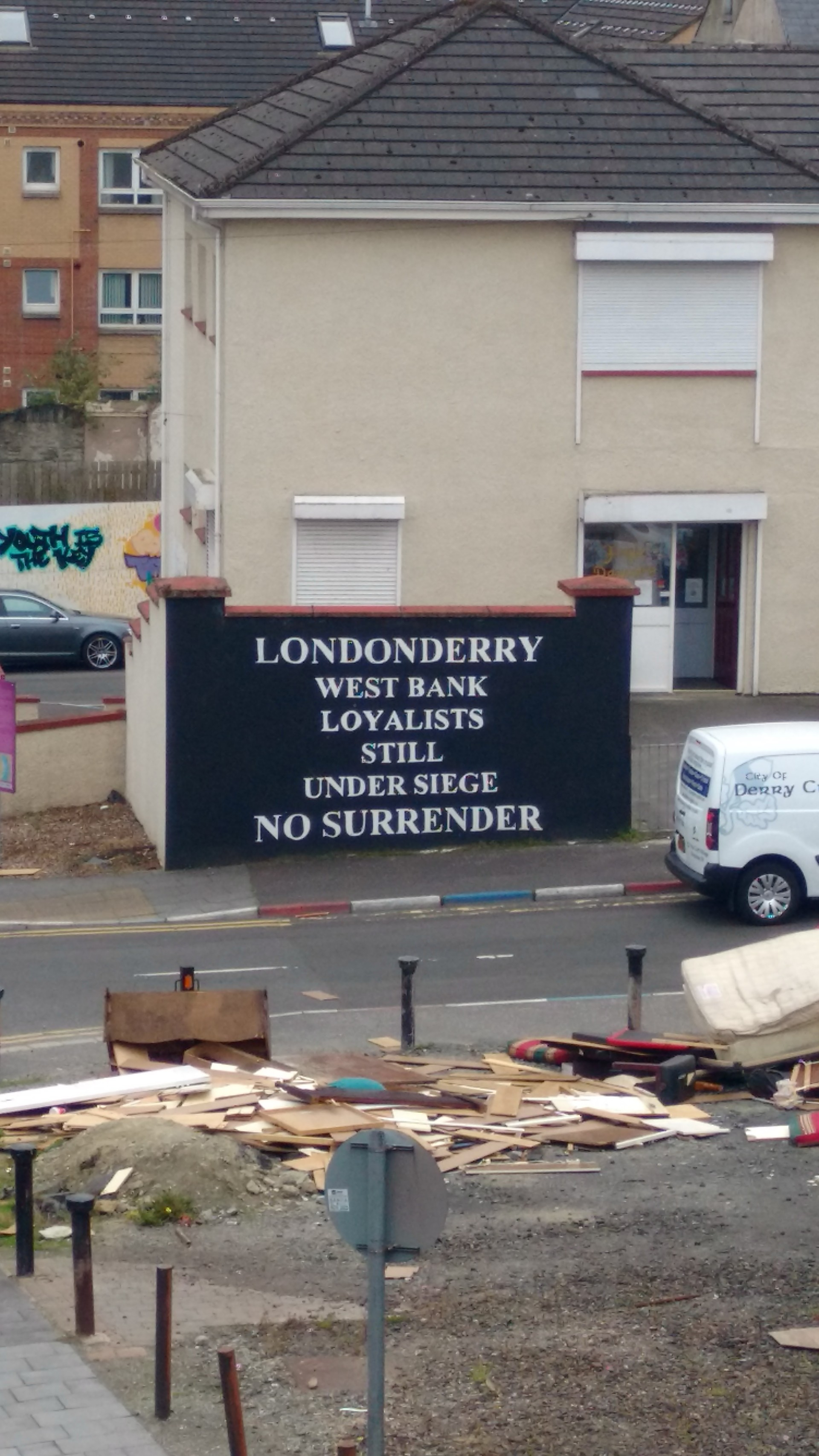
Mural in a loyalist Neighbourhood in Derry, taken in June 2017

A Police Ombudsman report from 2007 revealed that UVF members had been allowed to commit a string of terrorist offences, including murder, while working as informers for RUC Special Branch. It found that Special Branch had given informers immunity by ensuring they were not caught or convicted and blocking weapons searches. Ombudsman Nuala O'Loan concluded that this had led to "hundreds" of deaths and said senior British Government officials pressured her into halting her investigation. UVF member Robin Jackson has been linked to between 50 and 100 killings in Northern Ireland, although he was never convicted for any. It is alleged by many, including members of the security forces, that Jackson was an RUC agent. The Irish Government's Barron Report alleged that Jackson also "had relationships with British Intelligence". In 2016, a new Ombudsman report concluded that there had been collusion between the police and the UVF in relation to the deaths of six Catholic men in the 1994 Loughinisland massacre and that the investigation was undermined by the wish to protect informers, but found no evidence police had foreknowledge of the attack.

The Smithwick Tribunal concluded that a member of the Garda Síochána (the Republic of Ireland's police force) colluded with the IRA in the killing of two senior RUC officers in 1989. The two officers were ambushed by the IRA near Jonesborough, County Armagh, when returning from a cross-border security conference in Dundalk in the Republic of Ireland.

== The Disappeared ==
During the 1970s and 1980s, republican and loyalist paramilitaries abducted a number of individuals, many alleged to have been informers, who were then secretly killed and buried. Seventeen people – sixteen men and one woman, including a British Army officer – were killed during the Troubles and are informally referred to as "The Disappeared". All were abducted by republican groups. A further case, that of Lisa Dorrian, who disappeared in 2005 and is believed to have been abducted by loyalists, is often included in broader usage of the term, though her case falls outside the Troubles-era context and the remit of the Independent Commission for the Location of Victims' Remains. The remains of all but four of those referred to as "The Disappeared" have been recovered and returned to their families.

== British Army attacks on civilians ==
British government security forces, including the Military Reaction Force (MRF), carried out what have been described as "extrajudicial killings" of unarmed civilians. Their victims were often Catholic or suspected Catholic civilians unaffiliated with any paramilitaries, such as the Whiterock Road shooting of two unarmed Catholic civilians by British soldiers on 15 April 1972, and the Andersonstown shooting of seven unarmed Catholic civilians on 12 May that same year. A member of the MRF stated in 1978 that the Army often attempted false flag sectarian attacks, provoking sectarian conflict and "taking the heat off the Army". A former member stated: "[W]e were not there to act like an army unit, we were there to act like a terror group."

== Shoot-to-kill allegations ==
Republicans allege that the security forces operated a shoot-to-kill policy rather than arresting IRA suspects. The security forces denied this and pointed out that six of the eight IRA men killed in the Loughgall ambush in 1987 were heavily armed. On the other hand, the shooting of three unarmed IRA members in Gibraltar by the Special Air Service ten months later appeared to confirm suspicions among republicans and in the British and Irish media of a tacit British shoot-to-kill policy of suspected IRA members.

== Parades issue ==
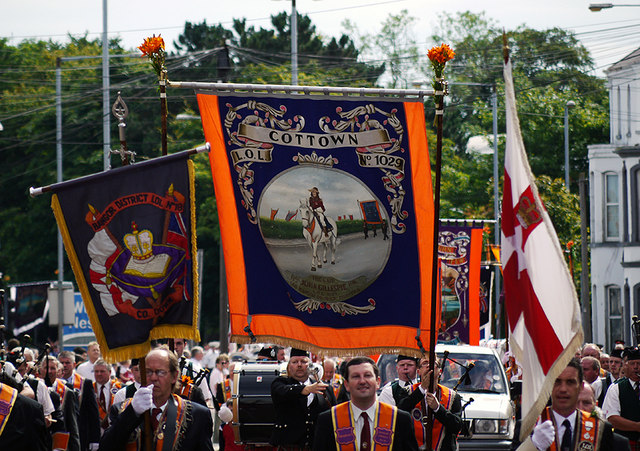
Orangemen marching in Bangor on the Twelfth of July 2010

Inter-communal tensions rise and violence often breaks out during the "marching season" when the Protestant Orange Order parades take place across Northern Ireland. The parades are held to commemorate William of Orange's victory in the Battle of the Boyne in 1690, which secured the Protestant Ascendancy and British rule in Ireland. One particular flashpoint which has caused continuous annual strife is the Garvaghy Road area in Portadown, where an Orange parade from Drumcree Church passes through a mainly nationalist estate off the Garvaghy Road. This parade has now been banned indefinitely, following nationalist riots against the parade and loyalist counter-riots against its banning.

In 1995, 1996, and 1997, there were several weeks of prolonged rioting throughout Northern Ireland over the impasse at Drumcree. A number of people died in this violence, including a Catholic taxi driver killed by the Loyalist Volunteer Force, and three (of four) nominally Catholic brothers (from a mixed-religion family) died when their house in Ballymoney was petrol-bombed.

== Social repercussions ==
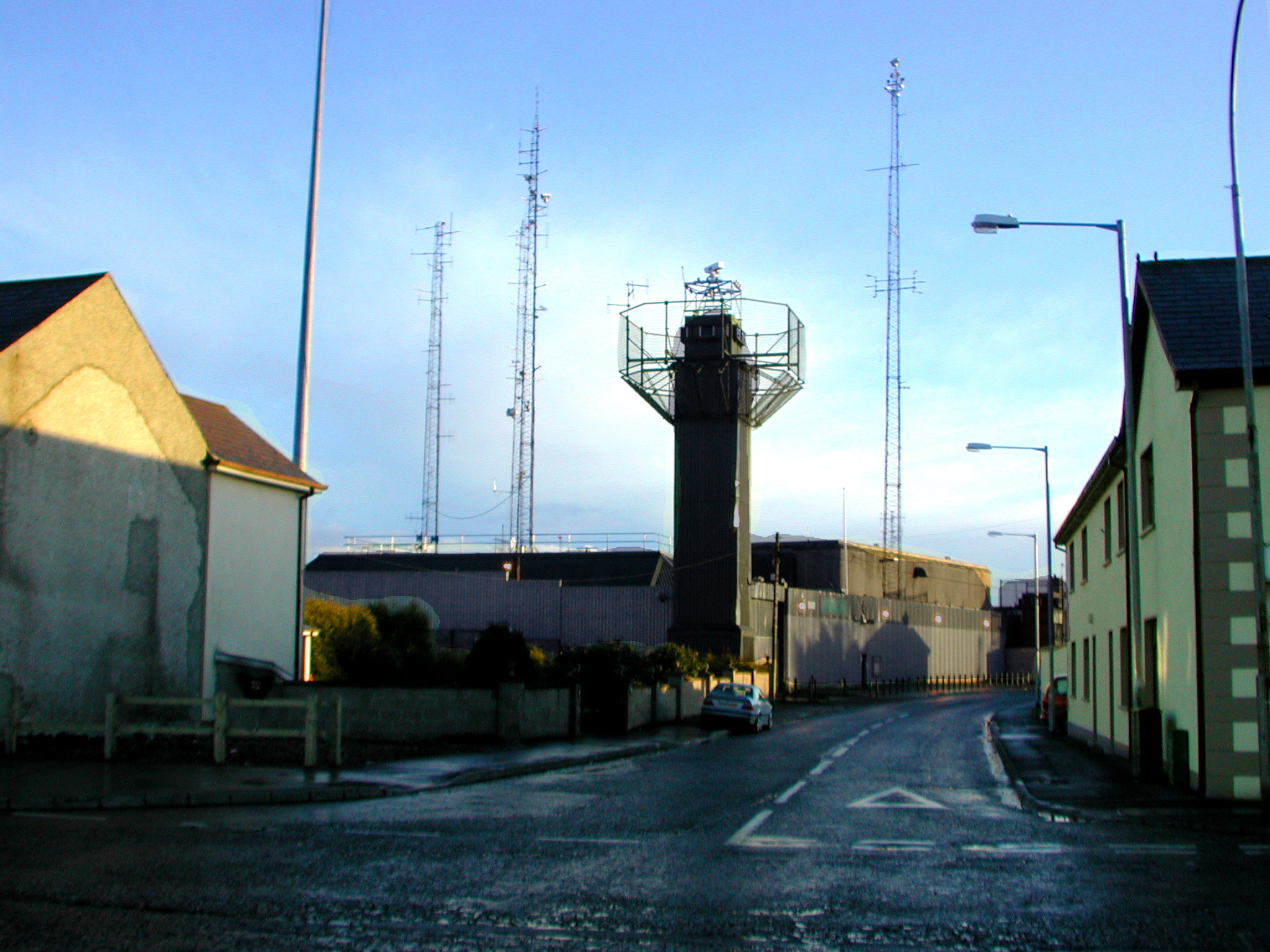
A watchtower at a heavily fortified RUC base in Crossmaglen

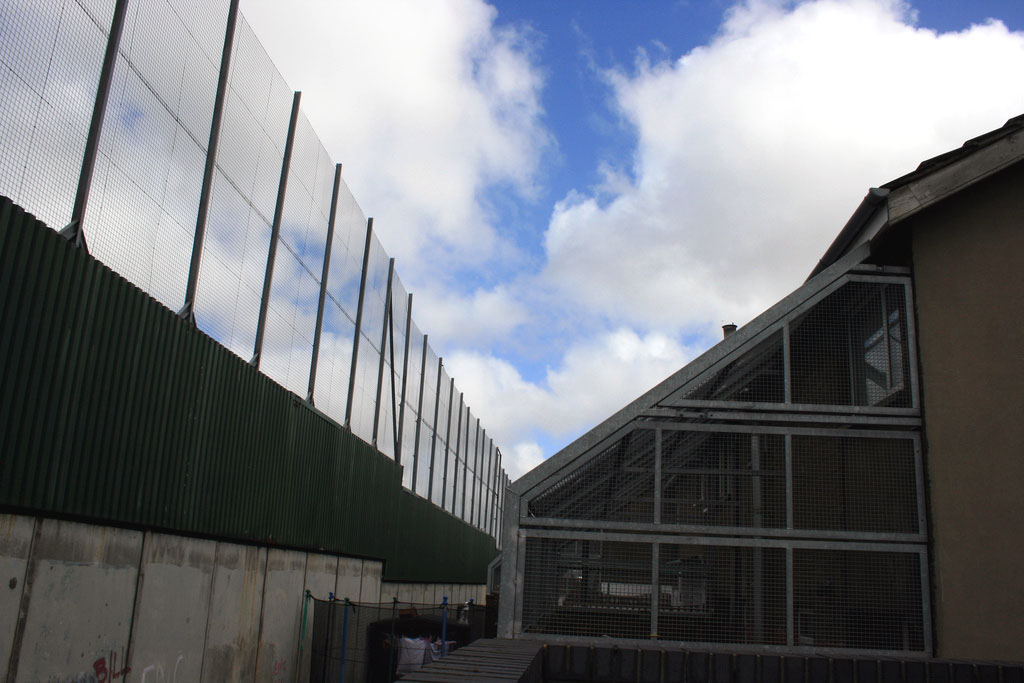
A "peace line" at the back of a house on Bombay Street, Belfast

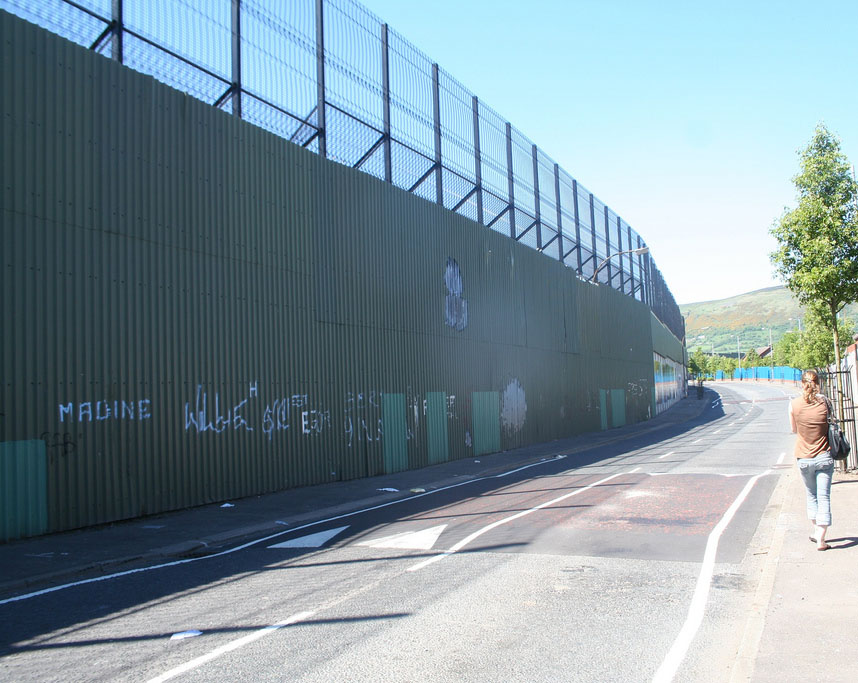
A "peace line" in Belfast, 2010, built to separate nationalist and unionist neighbourhoods

The impact of the Troubles on the ordinary people of Northern Ireland has been compared to that of the Blitz on the people of London. The stress resulting from bomb attacks, street disturbances, security checkpoints, and the constant military presence had the strongest effect on children and young adults. There was also the fear that local paramilitaries instilled in their respective communities with the punishment beatings, "romperings", and the occasional tarring and feathering meted out to individuals for various purported infractions. The legacy of the Troubles has been viewed by some, including researcher Rupert Taylor, as still persistent in Northern Ireland more than two decades after the Good Friday Agreement of 1998, as inequality and division between Catholics and Protestants continue.

In addition to the violence and intimidation, there was chronic unemployment and a severe housing shortage. Many people were rendered homeless as a result of intimidation or having their houses burnt, and urban redevelopment played a role in the social upheaval. Belfast families faced being transferred to new, alien estates when older, decrepit districts such as Sailortown and the Pound Loney were being demolished. According to social worker and author Sarah Nelson, this problem of homelessness and disorientation contributed to the breakdown of the normal fabric of society, allowing for paramilitaries to exert a strong influence in certain districts. Vandalism was also a major problem. In the 1970s, there were 10,000 vandalised empty houses in Belfast alone. Most of the vandals were aged between eight and thirteen.

According to one historian of the conflict, the stress of the Troubles engendered a breakdown in the previously strict sexual morality of Northern Ireland, resulting in a "confused hedonism" in respect of personal life. In Derry, illegitimate births and alcoholism increased for women and the divorce rate rose. Teenage alcoholism was also a problem, partly as a result of the drinking clubs established in both loyalist and republican areas. In many cases, there was little parental supervision of children in some of the poorer districts. The Department of Health has looked at a report written in 2007 by Mike Tomlinson of Queen's University, which asserted that the legacy of the Troubles has played a substantial role in the current rate of suicide in Northern Ireland.

Further social issues arising from the Troubles include antisocial behavior and an aversion towards political participation. According to one historian, children raised during the Troubles were found to develop similar antisocial external behaviours as children similarly born in regions of conflict, notably those born and raised during World War II. Further studies into the impact of violence on the psychological development of children in Northern Ireland also found that those raised during the Troubles were more likely to be averse towards political participation, noting that while older generations still actively associated with their own social and political groups, younger generations became wary of such groups as social and political divisions continued to expand during the thirty years of the Troubles.

Peace lines, which were built in Northern Ireland during the early years of the Troubles, remain in place.

According to a 2022 poll, 69% of Irish nationalists polled believe there was no option but "violent resistance to British rule during the Troubles".

== Casualties ==
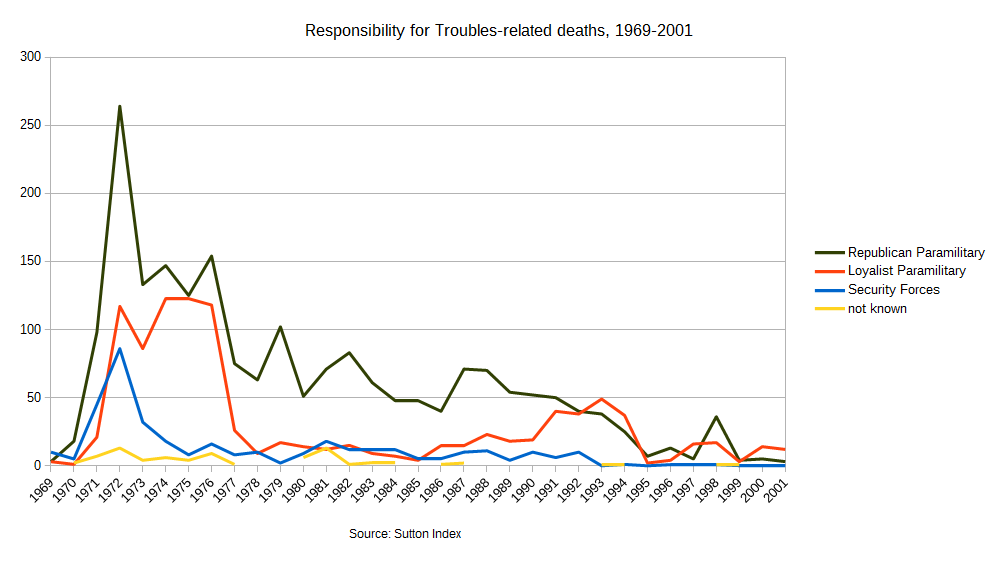
Responsibility for Troubles-related deaths between 1969 and 2001

According to the Conflict Archive on the Internet (CAIN), 3,532 people were killed as a result of the conflict between 1969 and 2001. Of these, 3,489 were killed up to 1998. According to the book Lost Lives (2006 edition), 3,720 people were killed as a result of the conflict from 1966 to 2006. Of these, 3,635 were killed up to 1998.

In The Politics of Antagonism: Understanding Northern Ireland, Brendan O'Leary and John McGarry point out that "nearly two per cent of the population of Northern Ireland have been killed or injured through political violence [...] If the equivalent ratio of victims to population had been produced in Great Britain in the same period some 100,000 people would have died, and if a similar level of political violence had taken place, the number of fatalities in the USA would have been over 500,000". Using this relative comparison to the US, analyst John M. Gates suggests that whatever one calls the conflict, it was "certainly not" a "low intensity conflict".

In 2010, it was estimated that 107,000 people in Northern Ireland suffered some physical injury as a result of the conflict. On the basis of data gathered by the Northern Ireland Statistics and Research Agency, the Victims Commission estimated that the conflict resulted in 500,000 'victims' in Northern Ireland alone. It defines 'victims' are those who are directly affected by 'bereavement', 'physical injury', or 'trauma' as a result of the conflict.

One statistical breakdown of Troubles deaths put the death toll at 3,466, with 3,218 lives lost in Northern Ireland, 125 in Great Britain, 105 in the Republic of Ireland, and 18 in the rest of Europe.

=== Responsibility ===
Republican paramilitaries were responsible for some 60% of all deaths, loyalists 30% and British security forces 10%.

Responsibility for killing
Responsible party	No.	%
Republican paramilitary groups	2,058	60%
Loyalist paramilitary groups	1,027	30%
British security forces	365	10%
Persons unknown	77	
Irish security forces	5	
Total	3,532	

Loyalists killed 48% of the civilian casualties, republicans killed 39%, and the British security forces killed 10%. Most of the Catholic civilians were killed by loyalists, and most of the Protestant civilians were killed by republicans.

Of those killed by republican paramilitaries:

- 1,080 (~52.5%) were members/former members of the British security forces
- 722 (~35.1%) were civilians
- 188 (~9.2%) were members of republican paramilitaries
- 57 (~2.8%) were members of loyalist paramilitaries
- 11 (~0.5%) were members of the Irish security forces

Of those killed by loyalist paramilitaries:

- 878 (~85.5%) were civilians
- 94 (~9.2%) were members of loyalist paramilitaries
- 41 (~4.0%) were members of republican paramilitaries
- 14 (~1.4%) were members of the British security forces

Of those killed by British security forces:

- 188 (~51.5%) were civilians
- 146 (~40.2%) were members of republican paramilitaries
- 18 (~5.0%) were members of loyalist paramilitaries
- 13 (~3.6%) were fellow members of the British security forces

=== Status ===
Approximately 52% of the dead were civilians, 32% were members or former members of the British security forces, 11% were members of republican paramilitaries, and 5% were members of loyalist paramilitaries. About 60% of the civilian casualties were Catholics, 30% of the civilians were Protestants, and the rest were from outside Northern Ireland.

About 257 of those killed were children under the age of seventeen, representing 7.2% of the total, while 274 children under the age of eighteen were killed during the conflict.

It has been the subject of dispute whether some individuals were members of paramilitary organisations. Several casualties that were listed as civilians were later claimed by the IRA as their members. One Ulster Defence Association (UDA) and three Ulster Volunteer Force (UVF) members killed during the conflict were also Ulster Defence Regiment (UDR) soldiers at the time of their deaths. At least one civilian victim was an off-duty member of the Territorial Army.

Deaths by status of victim
Status	No.
Civilians (inc. civilian political activists)	1840
British security force personnel (serving and former members)	1114
British Army (inc. UDR, RIR and TA)	757
Royal Ulster Constabulary	319
Northern Ireland Prison Service	26
English police forces	6
Royal Air Force	4
Royal Navy	2
Irish security force personnel	11
Garda Síochána	9
Irish Army	1
Irish Prison Service	1
Republican paramilitaries	397
Loyalist paramilitaries	170

=== Location ===
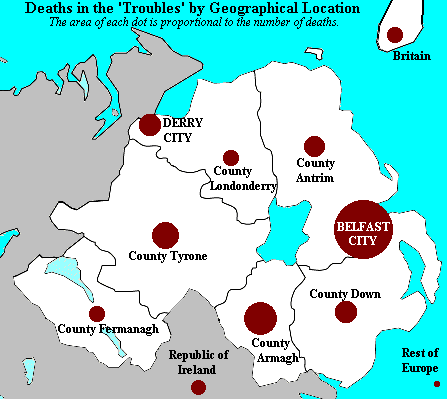
Troubles deaths by area

Most killings took place within Northern Ireland, especially in Belfast and County Armagh. Most of the killings in Belfast took place in the west and north of the city. Dublin, London and Birmingham were also affected, albeit to a lesser degree than Northern Ireland itself. Occasionally, the IRA attempted or carried out attacks on British targets in Gibraltar, Germany, Belgium and the Netherlands.

Conflict-related deaths by location
Location	No.
Belfast	1,541
West Belfast	623
North Belfast	577
South Belfast	213
East Belfast	128
County Armagh	477
County Tyrone	340
County Down	243
Derry City	227
County Antrim	209
County Londonderry	123
County Fermanagh	112
Republic of Ireland	116
England	125
Continental Europe	18

=== Chronological listing ===
Conflict-related deaths by year
Year	No.
2001	16
2000	19
1999	8
1998	55
1997	22
1996	18
1995	9
1994	64
1993	88
1992	88
1991	97
1990	81
1989	76
1988	104
1987	98
1986	61
1985	57
1984	69
1983	84
1982	111
1981	114
1980	80
1979	121
1978	82
1977	110
1976	297
1975	260
1974	294
1973	255
1972	480
1971	171
1970	26
1969	16

=== Additional statistics ===
Additional estimated statistics on the conflict
Incident	No.
Injury	47,541
Shooting incident	36,923
Armed robbery	22,539
People charged with paramilitary offences	19,605
Bombing and attempted bombing	16,209
Arson	2,225

== Northern Ireland Troubles (Legacy and Reconciliation) Act 2023 ==
Northern Ireland Troubles (Legacy and Reconciliation) Act 2023 (Note: Section 64.)
- Act of Parliament
- Parliament of the United Kingdom
- Long title: An Act to address the legacy of the Northern Ireland Troubles and promote reconciliation by establishing an Independent Commission for Reconciliation and Information Recovery, limiting criminal investigations, legal proceedings, inquests and police complaints, extending the prisoner release scheme in the Northern Ireland (Sentences) Act 1998, and providing for experiences to be recorded and preserved and for events to be studied and memorialised, and to provide for the validity of interim custody orders.
- Citation: 2023 c. 41
- Introduced by: Brandon Lewis MP, Secretary of State for Northern Ireland (Commons); Lord Caine (Lords)
- Territorial extent: Northern Ireland; England and Wales; Scotland; (Note: Section 62.)

Dates
- Royal assent: 18 September 2023
- Commencement: 18 September 2023; 18 November 2023; 1 May 2024; (Note: Section 63.)
Other legislation
Amends	Limitation Act 1980; Foreign Limitation Periods Act 1984; Northern Ireland (Sentences) Act 1998; Investigatory Powers Act 2016; Data Protection Act 2018; Sentencing Act 2020

Status: Amended

History of passage through Parliament

Text of statute as originally enacted

Revised text of statute as amended

On 18 September 2023, the Northern Ireland Troubles (Legacy and Reconciliation) Act 2023 (c. 41), also known as the Legacy Act, received royal assent.

The Northern Ireland Human Rights Commission has raised concerns about the legislation's incompatibility with the Human Rights Act 1998. The legislation exempts conduct related to the Troubles from prosecution and establishes the Independent Commission for Reconciliation and Information Recovery.

The legislation has been criticised by all major political parties in Northern Ireland, the Labour Party and the Irish government – the Irish government announced it was challenging the legislation through the European Court of Human Rights and Labour have pledged to repeal the legislation, but have stated they would keep the Independent Commission for Reconciliation and Information Recovery.

On 19 September 2025, the British and Irish governments jointly announced new proposals aimed at addressing legacy issues, including enhanced support for families of the Disappeared, expanded truth recovery mechanisms, and cross-border cooperation. The initiative was framed as a response to ongoing criticism of the Legacy Act and concerns about its compatibility with human rights standards.

== See also ==
- 2021 Northern Ireland riots
- Irish Children's Fund
- List of bombings during the Troubles
- List of Gardaí killed in the line of duty
- List of Irish uprisings
- Outline of the Troubles
- Segregation in Northern Ireland
- Timeline of Continuity IRA actions
- Timeline of Irish National Liberation Army actions
- Timeline of Provisional Irish Republican Army actions
- Timeline of Real Irish Republican Army actions
- Timeline of the Troubles
- Timeline of Ulster Defence Association actions
- Timeline of Ulster Volunteer Force actions

=== In popular culture ===
- List of books about the Troubles
- List of The Troubles films
- Murals in Northern Ireland
