= Irish Children's Fund =

Irish organization

The Irish Children's Fund (ICF) was a "not-for-profit, nonpolitical and interdenominational reconciliation" organization which operated from 1982 until 2011. It was involved in bringing Protestant and Catholic boys and girls from Belfast and Derry, some of whom had experienced the violence of Northern Ireland's Catholic-Protestant divide, to stay with American families in the Chicago area, Northwest Indiana and Indianapolis.

== History ==
ICF was founded in 1982 by Robert N. O'Connor, a native of Dublin and resident of Hudson, Ohio. 164 children participated in the first summer. Over the next twenty-five years, the ICF hosted over 3,000 children from Belfast and Derry. The children, 11 years of age, spent one summer month in the Chicago area, Northwest Indiana, and Indianapolis with volunteer hosting families. Each year, up to 100 children participated in the summer program.

Volunteers, whose primary responsibility involved the coordination of the hosting families, fund raising activities, and the summer mixing events for all, administered the USA program. There were two part-time employees staffing the ICF office. Sources of funding included grassroots fundraising activities sponsored by the host families.

The ICF also operated a reconciliation center in Ballycastle, County Antrim. Small groups of children were brought together for weekend gatherings during the school year and to spend one week at the center each summer.

In 2011 the last group of teens went to the United States.
