= Ulster Protestant Association =

Irish loyalist paramilitary group

The Ulster Protestant Association (UPA) were a loyalist paramilitary group organised in Belfast in August 1920 to prevent Ulster (or that region which would later become Northern Ireland) being included in an independent Irish Free State.

In 1921, plumber and UPA member Thomas Pentland was arrested for the murder of a Catholic named Murtagh McStocker, supposedly a member of the IRA; Pentland was acquitted.

The UPA were also associated with the 1922 murders of Catholic civilians in Ballymacarrett. John William Nixon was alleged to be associated with the UPA.

In 1923 a police report described the Association as dominated by "the Protestant hooligan element [whose] whole aim and object was simply the extermination of Catholics by any and every means." Bomb attacks were made against children, crowds leaving Mass and onto crowded trains. Their headquarters was in an East Belfast pub, with a flogging-horse upstairs to punish members who violated UPA rules.

The UPA is said to have provided many members of the "murder gangs" active in Belfast during 1921–22. Other Protestant gangs active at that time went by names like the Imperial Guards, Crawford's Tigers and the Cromwell Clubs. Many UPA members were recruited into the Ulster Special Constabulary, the infamous "B Specials."

Although it is sometimes said to have dissolved in 1922, a hardcore remained active, murdering several Catholics in the mid-1930s.

The UPA fought side-by-side with the IRA during the 1932 Outdoor Relief riots, swapping places in order to confuse Royal Ulster Constabulary policemen.

The name was also used as a cover name by the loyalist group "Spirit of Drumcree" in 1998.
