= Allen Feldman =

Allen Feldman is an anthropologist and Professor of Media, Culture, and Communication at the New York University (NYU) Steinhardt School of Culture, Education, and Human Development. He has taught at Central European University in Budapest, the Institute of Humanities Studies in Ljubljana, Slovenia, and in the Department of Performance Studies at NYU. He received a Ph.D. in cultural anthropology at the New School for Social Research, where he also received his M.A. and B.A.

His research and teaching interests include visual culture and violence, the political anthropology of the human body and the senses, performance studies, state cultures, and the political archaeology of media and technology.

His second book, Formations of Violence: The Narrative of the Body and Political Terror in Northern Ireland, was published by the University of Chicago Press in 1991. It is a treatment of the relationship between the objectives of violent politics in Northern Ireland and their application in the methods of real violence as a vehicle for sustaining an ideological content despite its success in achieving political goals. His work has explored the relationship between "the mediazation of the war" and the "militization of the media". For his work on the ethnography of the South African Truth and Reconciliation Commission, he was awarded a Harry Frank Guggenheim Research Grant.
