= Andy Robinson (loyalist) =

Andrew Robinson is a Northern Irish former loyalist paramilitary leader. Robinson held the rank of "Brigadier" in the Ulster Defence Association (UDA) and was leader of the organisation's North Antrim and Londonderry Brigade as well as a member of the UDA's Inner Council.

== Libya ==
Robinson, from Derry, County Londonderry, Northern Ireland, served with the British armed forces at an early age, enlisting in 3 Commando Brigade. He later joined the Ulster Special Constabulary. He joined the UDA at an unspecified date early in its history and was a close lieutenant of local brigadier Glenn Barr. In November 1974 Robinson joined Barr, Andy Tyrie, Tommy Lyttle and Newtownabbey-based Harry Chicken on a trip to Libya. According to historian Ian S. Wood, Tyrie was invited to the country in order that a UDA delegation might meet Libyan leader Muammar Gaddafi. Gaddafi had apparently been impressed by the UDA's role in the Ulster Workers' Council strike and had sent an invitation through an Irish businessman as a result. Steve Bruce contends that the trip was actually arranged by Walter Hegarty, the secretary of the Dublin-based group Development of Irish Resources, a business organisation that wanted to develop the search for oil off the coast of Ireland. They felt that the governments both north and south of the border were showing too little interest in the project and wanted to involve Libya as an alternative.

The trip itself was largely unsuccessful as the UDA delegation was followed throughout by British Special Branch agents and they never actually got to meet Gaddafi. They were kept under tight security, denied access to alcohol and in their hotel Robinson spotted a delegation from the Provisional IRA (PIRA). The funding they had hoped to get, including a scheme to purchase the Belfast News Letter and turn it into the UDA's official mouthpiece, did not materialise and no weapons were secured either.

Charles Harding Smith, who at the time was seeking to remove Tyrie as his main rival to the control of the UDA, issued veiled threats to Robinson, Barr and Chicken for their involvement in the Libya trip, which he had attempted to portray as a cover for secret Tripoli-based negotiations with the PIRA. Ultimately Harding Smith was removed from the scene and Tyrie's control assured. Robinson's presence on the Libyan trip was referred to by David Norris during later Seanad Éireann debates on Libyan involvement in the Troubles.

== Brigadier ==
Under the former commando, a team from the North Antrim and Londonderry Brigade pulled off a notorious commando-style raid into the Republic of Ireland that they dubbed "Operation Greencastle". Named after the County Donegal village which it targeted, the raid saw two units under Robinson cross Lough Foyle to attack trawlers at the village which, according to intelligence reports the UDA had received, were importing guns for the Provisional IRA. Two trawlers were destroyed and three badly damaged by incendiary devices from the raiding party and the UDA claimed that they made off with a haul of weapons that included a rocket launcher and several automatic weapons. The incident became the subject of much speculation in the press, with stories even appearing that agents from a Warsaw Pact country had arrived that night by submarine, although, whilst many of the claims and counter-claims were unproven, it was a significant propaganda coup for the UDA as they had been able to enter the Republic of Ireland, bomb several boats, and escape without loss of life or arrest.

Barr left his role as brigadier around 1975 to concentrate on politics and Robinson assumed command of the brigade in his stead. Under Robinson the Brigade was not one of the most active although he was a close ally of Tyrie, who remembered him as "one of our best, as good as John McMichael".

On 22 November 1976 Catholic civilian John Toland (35) was shot and killed by the UDA in the Happy Landing Bar in Derry where he worked as manager. In a statement the loyalists claimed that Toland was killed in retaliation for Corporal William Kidd, an Ulster Defence Regiment (UDR) soldier killed by republicans in the city four days earlier. The attack came soon after the UDA shot James Loughrey (25) in his Greysteel home. Loughrey died in Altnagelvin Area Hospital on 25 November. Loughrey's shooting was also claimed as a revenge attack, this time for the killing of UDR soldier Ronald Bond on 7 November. The killings would subsequently become central to the "supergrass" trials, as well as subsequent investigations into collusion between paramilitaries and state actors.

== Departure ==
UDA member Leonard Campbell made statements about the murders of Toland and Loughrey in 1986, implicating up to thirty of his fellow paramilitaries in activities connected to the killings. It was at this that time Robinson left Northern Ireland. He was neither arrested for involvement in nor questioned about the killings. Robinson had been named as having given the order for the two killings.

The two cases were subsequently investigated by the Historical Enquiries Team with the report suggesting that collusion had occurred between the UDA leader who ordered the attack and state forces. Although the report did not name Robinson, the Derry Journal reported that he was the leader who ordered the attack and was also suspected of being a British agent. The report indicated that Robinson was close to a number of figures in the UDR as well as a former Royal Ulster Constabulary member. The report continued that Robinson's name had been placed on the Police National Computer following his departure from Northern Ireland and yet, despite returning to the region several times, he had not been arrested or questioned.

Reports in 2007 placed Robinson in Portpatrick, Scotland, where he was running a guesthouse. The Pat Finucane Centre, which investigates collusion between the British government and loyalist paramilitaries during the Troubles, has raised questions about Robinson.
