= Fogle =

Fogle is a surname. Notable people with the surname include:

- Ben Fogle (born 1973), English television presenter and writer
- Bruce Fogle (born 1944), veterinarian and author
- Douglas Fogle, American art curator
- James Fogle (1936–2012), American author
- Jared Fogle (born 1977), child prostitution client and child pornography possessor, Subway spokesman
- Julius Fogle (born 1971), American boxer
- Larry Fogle (born 1953), American basketball player
- Lewis Fogle, American man wrongfully convicted of murder

== See also ==
- Fogel
- Fogle Peak
- Goldfogle
