= Sammy Smyth (loyalist) =

Northern Irish loyalist activist

- Born: c. 1929; Belfast, Northern Ireland
- Died: 10 March 1976 (aged 46); Ardoyne, Belfast, Northern Ireland
- Cause of death: Assassinated by the Provisional IRA
- Political party: New Ulster Political Research Group
- Military career
- Paramilitary: Ulster Defence Association
- Conflict: The Troubles

Samuel Smyth (c. 1929 – 10 March 1976) was a Northern Irish loyalist activist. A founder member of the Ulster Defence Association (UDA) he was the early public face of the movement as the organisation's spokesman, and he later became involved in the group's attempts to politicise. He was assassinated by the Provisional IRA during the Troubles. Author Steve Bruce described Smyth as the "sometime editor of the Ulster Militant and a loose cannon who enjoyed an exciting and erratic relationship with the UDA".

== Development of the UDA ==
Smyth was a native of Louisa Street in Belfast, a loyalist interface area street which linked the Crumlin Road to the Oldpark Road and which faced "the Bone", a Catholic area at the bottom of Ardoyne. According to Smyth the area was regularly attacked by republicans from Ardoyne throwing nail bombs and shooting, and that in response he organised local men into a vigilante group. The group erected barriers on Louisa Street although these were removed by the British Army, which had a base in the area. In his youth he had worked at Harland & Wolff shipyard.

Smyth attended and addressed meetings at Aberdeen Street school on the Shankill Road which were organised by Alan Moon, who had a similar group in that area. Several of these groups from across Belfast met and agreed to pool their resources, leading to the formation of the Ulster Defence Association (UDA) in September 1971. Smyth, who was a community worker in the Lower Oldpark area and who was considered articulate, was the first public spokesman for the new movement. His first engagement came in 1972 when he appeared, wearing a mask, on a television debate with John Hume, warning him of a "Protestant backlash" against the recent formation of the Social Democratic and Labour Party (SDLP).

Smyth's rhetoric at this time was noted for its extremism. He reacted to an interview with Dáithí Ó Conaill published in the press by stating "at that moment in time I could have, without a twinge of conscience, bombed every well-filled chapel in Belfast". He also edited a news sheet entitled Ulster Militant which urged war on republicans and their "passive sympathisers" by the emerging UDA. The journal also repeated claims, which had initially appeared earlier in the Protestant Telegraph, that the Easter Rising had been personally blessed by Pope Benedict XV as well as allegations of Smyth's own devising that the green, white and orange colours of the Flag of Ireland had been chosen to represent the Papacy rather than Thomas Davis's desire that Protestant and Catholic should unite in peace and that James Connolly, the socialist activist whose Irish Citizen Army had taken part in the 1916 Rising, had been ordained as a priest in the Roman Catholic Church.

All of this was despite the fact that Smyth's previous community work had seen him participate in a number of projects involving Catholics and Protestants, particularly with regards to housing. As chairman of the Lower Shankill Community Association he had even spoke at events at University College Dublin and University College Galway. He briefly enrolled at Queen's University Belfast around 1974 as a mature student but did not stay long.

== Decline in influence ==
Smyth took up the cause of recruitment for the UDA, and travelled around Belfast and beyond securing new members for the organisation. However he was seen as lacking any military ability and as the UDA increasingly moved from vigilantism to sectarian killings his input became less important and he was sidelined. His position of leadership had effectively ended by 1973, by which time other early leaders such as Jim Anderson, had also been pushed aside with power lying firmly in the hands of Charles Harding Smith and Tommy Herron.

As the UDA's public spokesman, Smyth was a prominent figure in the May 1974 Ulster Workers' Council strike and he produced the daily bulletin of the Ulster Workers' Council (UWC) for the duration of the strike with Vanguard Unionist Progressive Party politician David Trimble. Following the Dublin and Monaghan bombings, which were carried out by the Ulster Volunteer Force (UVF) during the strike, Smyth told the media "I am very happy about the bombings in Dublin. There is a war with the Free State and now we are laughing at them". The outcry which followed Smyth's statements on the bombings saw him disciplined by the UDA – in the form of a punishment beating – before being formally removed as UDA spokesman.

== Political activity ==
In the aftermath of the strike, Andy Tyrie added Smyth to his new political initiative, the New Ulster Political Research Group (NUPRG), reasoning that the articulate Smyth could be of use in raising the profile of the UDA and helping to secure funding from overseas. Smyth emphasised the working class nature of the UDA and was highly critical of the mainstream unionist politicians, adopting a siege mentality populism similar to that endorsed by some White nationalist populists in the southern United States, albeit with a Protestant rather than a white identity as the basis and Catholics rather than African-Americans as the out-group.

As part of his taste for populism and community politics, Smyth advocated the establishment of a Community Convention to be made of delegates from interested parties such as community groups, trade unions and paramilitaries although he did not reveal what purpose he had in mind for this body and in the event it was not adopted as an official UDA or NUPRG policy.

In 1974, Smyth appeared on an edition of Weekend World alongside William Craig and Ruairí Ó Brádaigh debating the future of Northern Ireland. On air the two paramilitaries agreed that they both felt alienation from mainstream politics, whilst in a discussion off air Smyth intimated to Ó Brádaigh that he might be amenable to the notion of a federal Ireland, something that was central to Ó Brádaigh's own Éire Nua policy.

In the late summer of 1975, a group of American academics and businesspeople with Irish links organised a conference in Amherst, Massachusetts to discuss the future of Northern Ireland. Although they sent out invitations to several leading political and paramilitary figures few chose to attend, with the exception of Irish Republican Socialist Party leader Seamus Costello and the Reverend Martin Smyth, the Grand Master of the Orange Institution. The invitation was refused by the Ulster Volunteer Force whilst Provisional IRA representatives who accepted were refused entry visas; however, the UDA sent a delegation made up of Andy Tyrie, Glenn Barr and Sammy Smyth. Whilst the delegation pushed the ideals of Ulster nationalism, which was found favour with the UDA at that point, during the debates Smyth's main contribution was to argue that the civil rights that had dominated nationalist rhetoric was as applicable to Protestants as it was to Catholics.

== Later activity ==
Smyth was interviewed by The News Letter in 1976 and he discussed the formation and development of the then legal UDA in some detail with the paper. Around the same time he gave an interview to The Gown in which he endorsed sectarian killings, arguing that "war exists in Northern Ireland and in a war situation there are no innocent people" before adding that "there will be no room for R.C.s [Roman Catholics] in a new state". Despite these pronouncements Smyth had returned to his earlier interests in housing advocacy and was again working on behalf of some Catholics. He was a regular visitor to the staunchly republican New Lodge area where he was involved in housing issues. For his own part Smyth had moved to Downshire Park East in the Cregagh area of east Belfast.

In 1976, Smyth was caught in the crossfire of a loyalist feud between the UDA and the UVF which had its roots in the UWC strike and which had continued on and off ever since. In early 1976 Smyth, who was still acting as spokesman for the UDA on an occasional basis, was attacked at his home by members of the UVF and, whilst he was able to prevent them from entering the house, he still suffered minor injuries in the attack.

On 10 March 1976, Smyth was shot and killed by the Provisional IRA whilst he visited his sister on Alliance Avenue in Ardoyne. He was 46 years old.
