= David Fogel =

David Fogel may refer to:

- David B. Fogel (born 1964), American computer scientist
- Davy Fogel (born 1945), Northern Irish paramilitary

== See also ==
- David Vogel (disambiguation)
- Fogel (surname)
