= Crumlin Road =

Road in Belfast, Northern Ireland

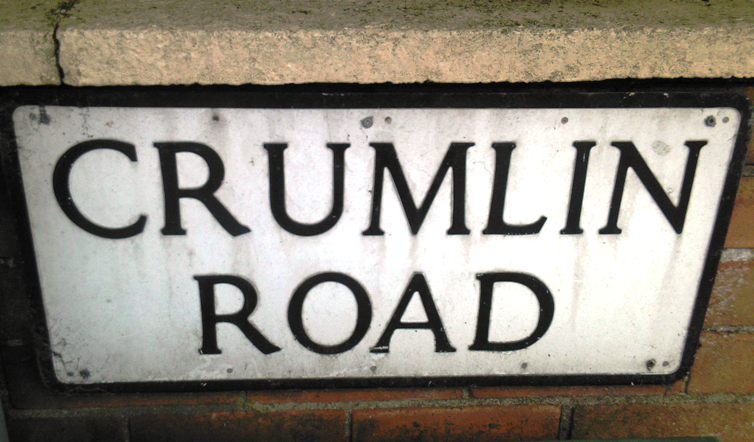
Road sign at Ballysillan

The Crumlin Road is a main road in north-west Belfast, Northern Ireland. The road runs from north of Belfast City Centre for about four miles to the outskirts of the city. It also forms part of the longer A52 road which leads out of Belfast to the town of Crumlin (from Irish Cromghlinn, meaning 'crooked glen'). The lower section of the road houses a number of historic buildings, including the city's former law courts and prison, whilst the road encompasses several large housing areas, including Ardoyne, Ballysillan (from Irish Baile na Saileán, meaning 'townland of the willow groves/sally groves') and Ligoniel (from Irish Lag an Aoil, meaning 'hollow of the lime').

== Lower Crumlin Road ==
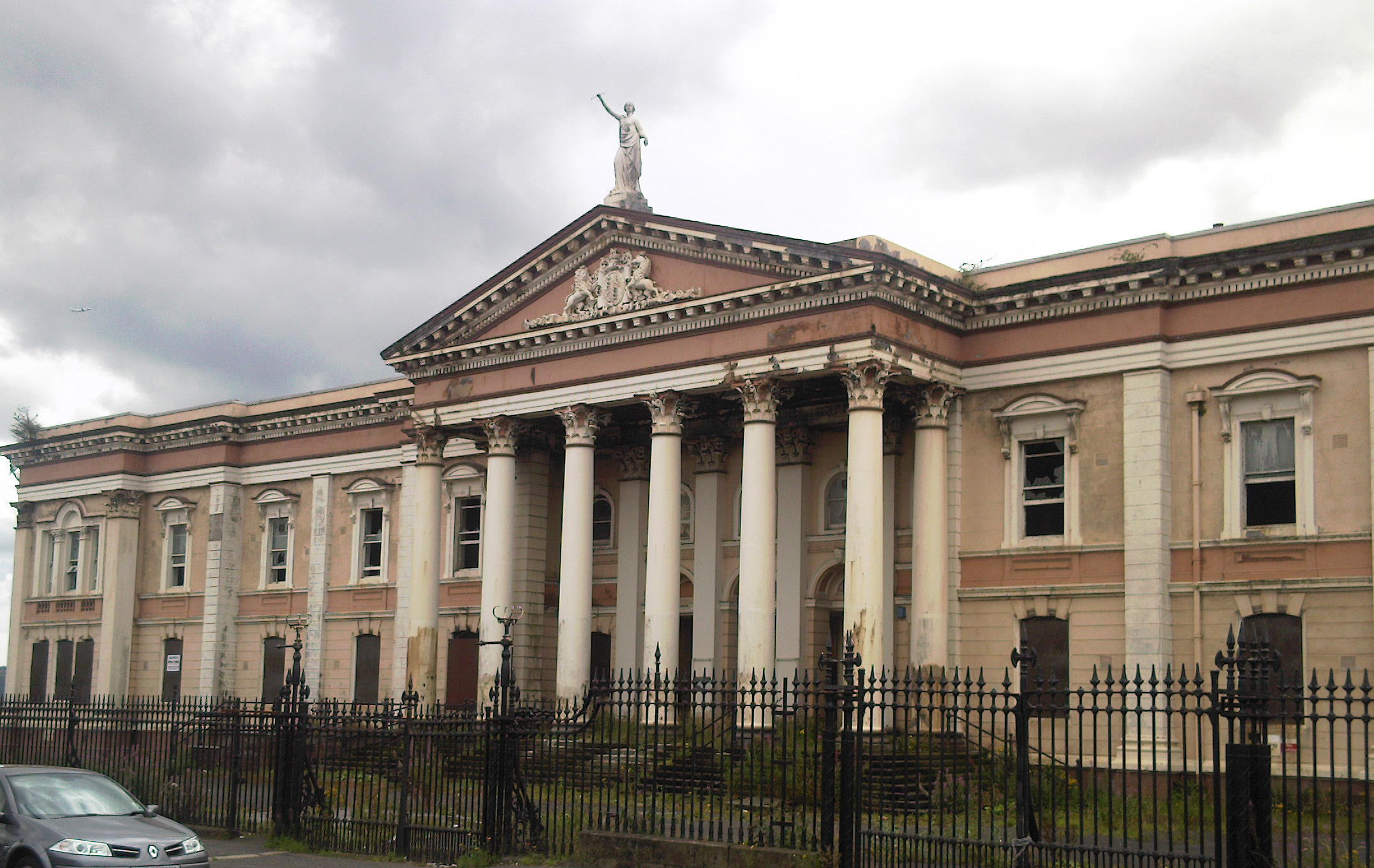
Courthouse

The Crumlin Road begins at Carlisle Circus, a roundabout north of the city centre just past the Westlink motorway. It is one of four exits from Carlisle Circus, the others being the Antrim Road, a major arterial and residential route that forms part of the A6, Clifton Street which leads back to the centre, and Denmark Street which leads to the area of the lower Shankill Road. The lowest section of the road contains a number of buildings of local and historic interest. The Mater Infirmorum Hospital, known colloquially as the Mater, is found just past Carlisle Circus and provides healthcare to the north of the city as well as the surrounding area. A 19th-century structure, the hospital is beside the derelict Crumlin Road Gaol which, from 1846 to 1996 was the main prison in Belfast. After a number years of dereliction the venue opened as tourist attraction in 2013 and offers guided tours and venue hire. Facing the prison is the Crumlin Road Courthouse, which now also lies empty. Both buildings were designed by renowned local architect Charles Lanyon.

The Freemasons' Hall, the headquarters for a number of Masonic Lodges attached to the Provincial Grand Lodge of Antrim is adjacent to the prison. The hall was built in 1939, replacing an earlier building further along the Crumlin Road.

== Oldpark to Ardoyne ==
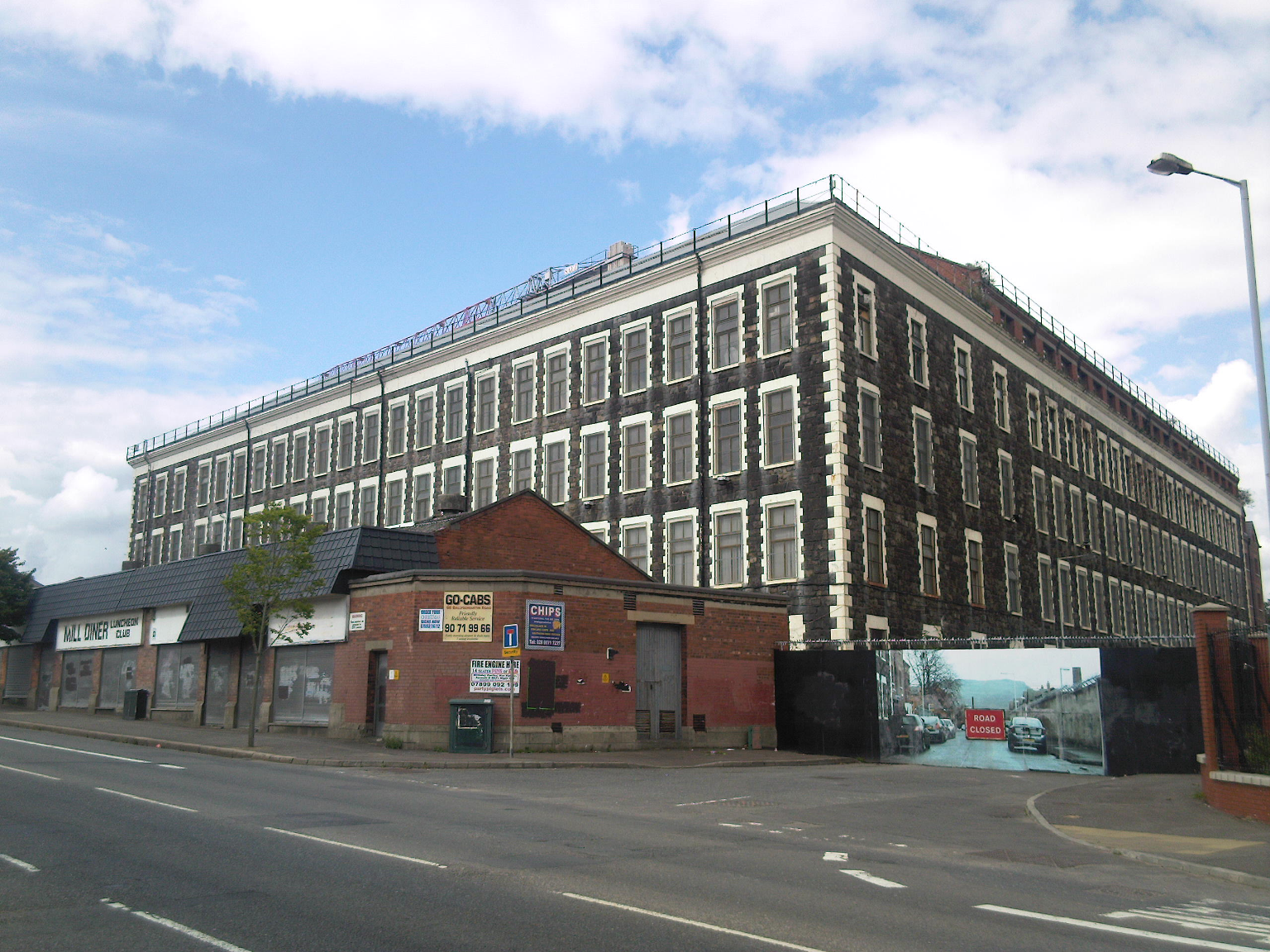
Ewart's Mill with Flax Street sealed off on the right

The road is intersected by Agnes Street and Clifton Park Avenue and at this section the Oldpark Road divides off. At this point the Crumlin Road remains a largely loyalist area although with much of the Oldpark Road republican it is witness to a series of sectarian interfaces. Belfast City Council has converted a section of waste ground at this junction into a greenfield space whilst local shops have also been redeveloped. Significant levels of new housing have also been built here and as of 2011 this area is still undergoing redevelopment. St Mary's Church of Ireland, another 19th-century building, is also to be found in this part of the road and it is noted for its historic pipe organ. A Presbyterian church further up the road also dates from the 19th century whilst further up the road, facing the Ardoyne area there is a Roman Catholic Church, the Holy Cross Church.

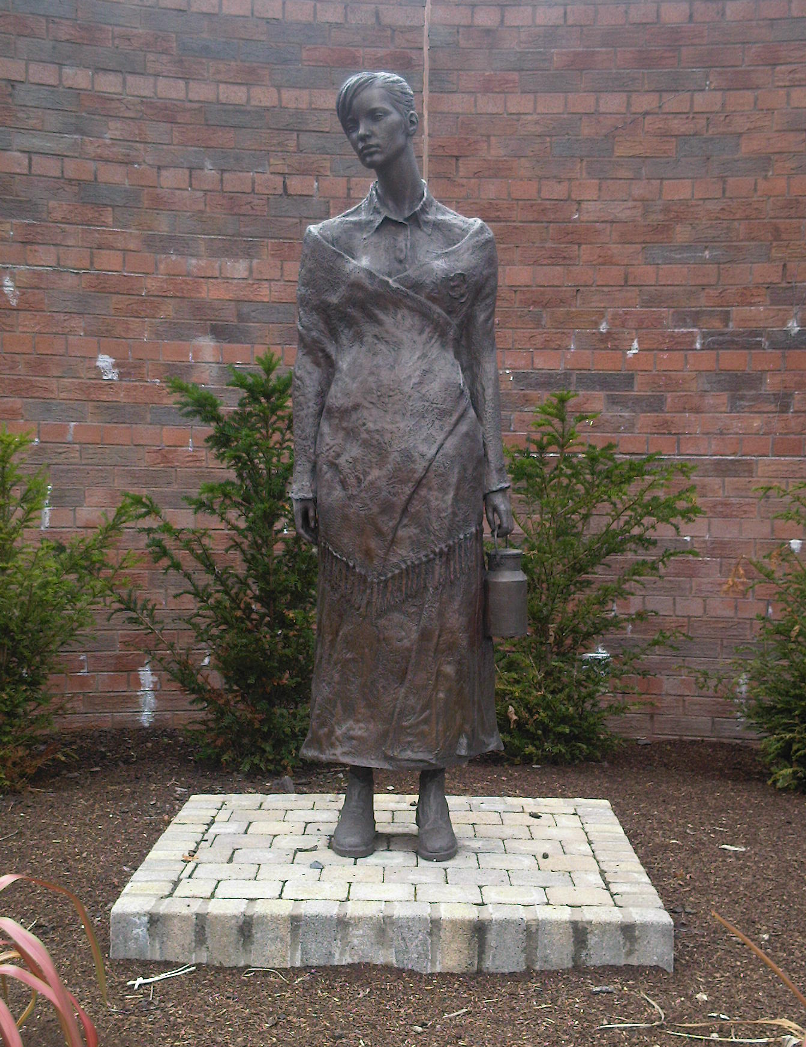
The Milly

Commercially this area of the Crumlin Road contains some shops, notably a number of cash and carry and similar wholesale retail outlets on the Hillview Road, a conduit linking the Crumlin and Oldpark Roads. Historically however one of the most important commercial properties was the Crumlin Road mill. The mill was built for William Ewart, a cotton trader and politician who switched his interests to the production of linen, which at the time became the leading industry in the city. During the Second World War the mill was converted from the production of linen to the manufacture of munitions. The mill employed thousands of local people, mostly young women who were known locally as "millies". Although the mill is no longer in operation its industrial heritage is commemorated in a nearby statue of one such "Milly". The area around the mill, which straddles the republican Ardoyne area and the loyalist Shankill and Woodvale areas is a major interface area on the Crumlin Road with Flax Street, which runs along the side of the mill, ending in a peace line. Similarly access to the Crumlin Road from Leopold Street and Columbia Street, both part of the loyalist Woodvale area, is also blocked by peace lines. Another local mill, Edenderry Mill, which dates back to Victorian times, has been converted into an apartment complex consisting of 55 flats.

== Interface areas ==
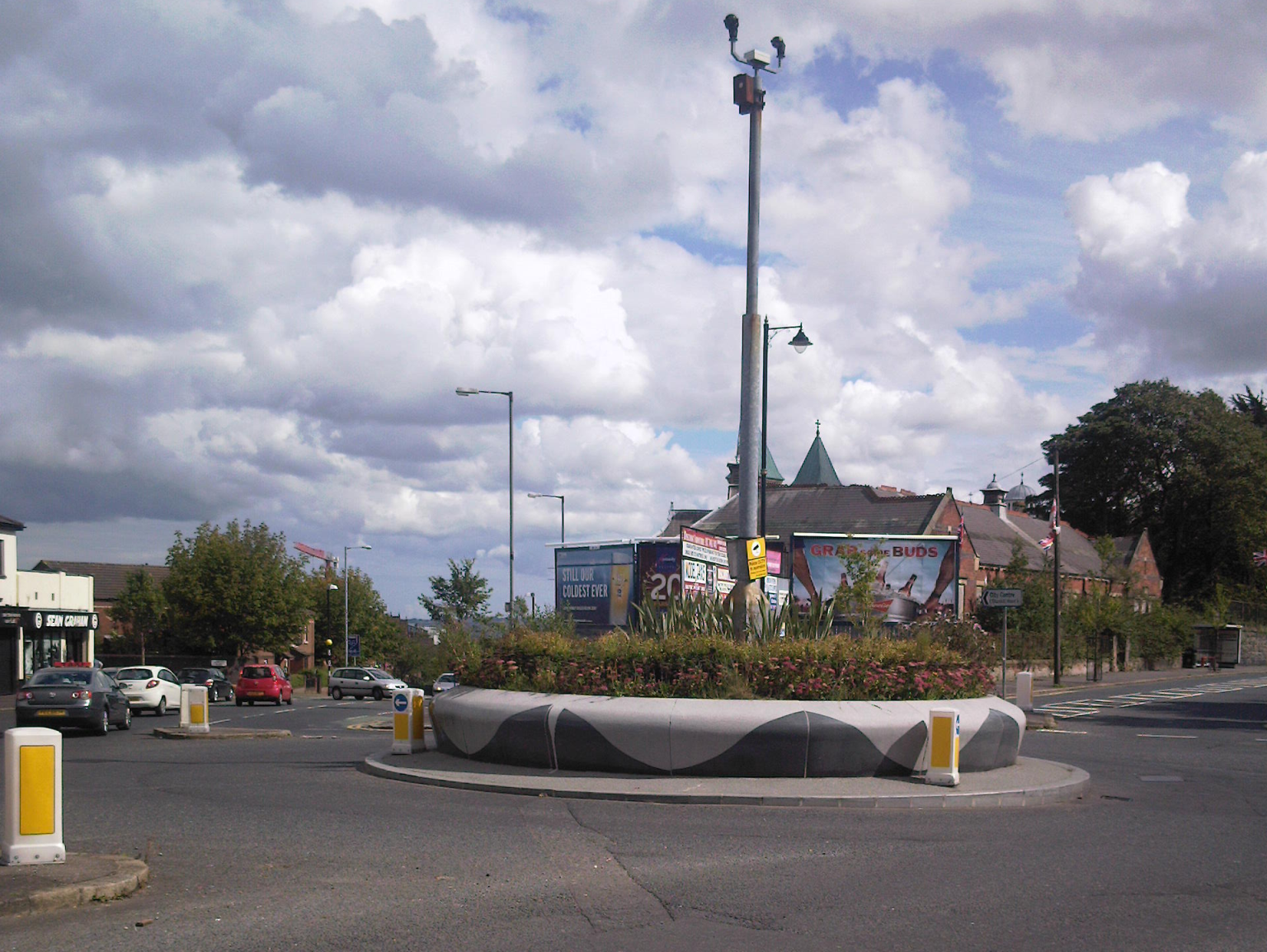
Roundabout as viewed from Twaddell Avenue. Crumlin Road is the left-hand exit

The Crumlin Road reaches another junction just past the Holy Cross Church, where a number of streets branch off into different areas of the city. The Ardoyne Road is an interface area, containing both republican and loyalist sections, and it was the scene of the Holy Cross dispute, a series of clashes between the two communities at a Catholic girls school in 2001 and 2002. The school is close to Alliance Avenue, the effective dividing line between republican Ardoyne and loyalist Glenbryn, and the site of another peace line. The aforementioned junction also leads to Brompton Road, part of Ardoyne, the Woodvale Road, which leads backs down to the Shankill Road, and Twaddell Avenue, which leads to the loyalist Ballygomartin Road. The roundabout at this junction has been redeveloped as part of the council's initiatives aimed at regenerating the area. In 2013 the end of Twaddell Avenue, facing Ardoyne, became the site of a loyalist protest camp in support of the Orange Order, who had been barred from marching past Ardoyne by the Parades Commission. The protest, which has seen clashes between loyalists and police, is ongoing as of October 2013 with organisers sing that they are prepared to remain at the location until Christmas 2013 or even longer. As of February 2014 a presence is still maintained at the protest, with policing costs estimated at £7 million. Twaddell Avenue itself was named after assassinated Unionist politician William Twaddell.

Past the roundabout the Crumlin Road is largely made up of private housing for around a mile. Parts of the road in this area border on Forthriver Park, which separates the Crumlin Road from the Glencairn estate, whilst the Mercy Primary School is also found in this area. Ardoyne library is also located in this area, immediately after the roundabout.

== Ballysillan and upper Crumlin Road ==
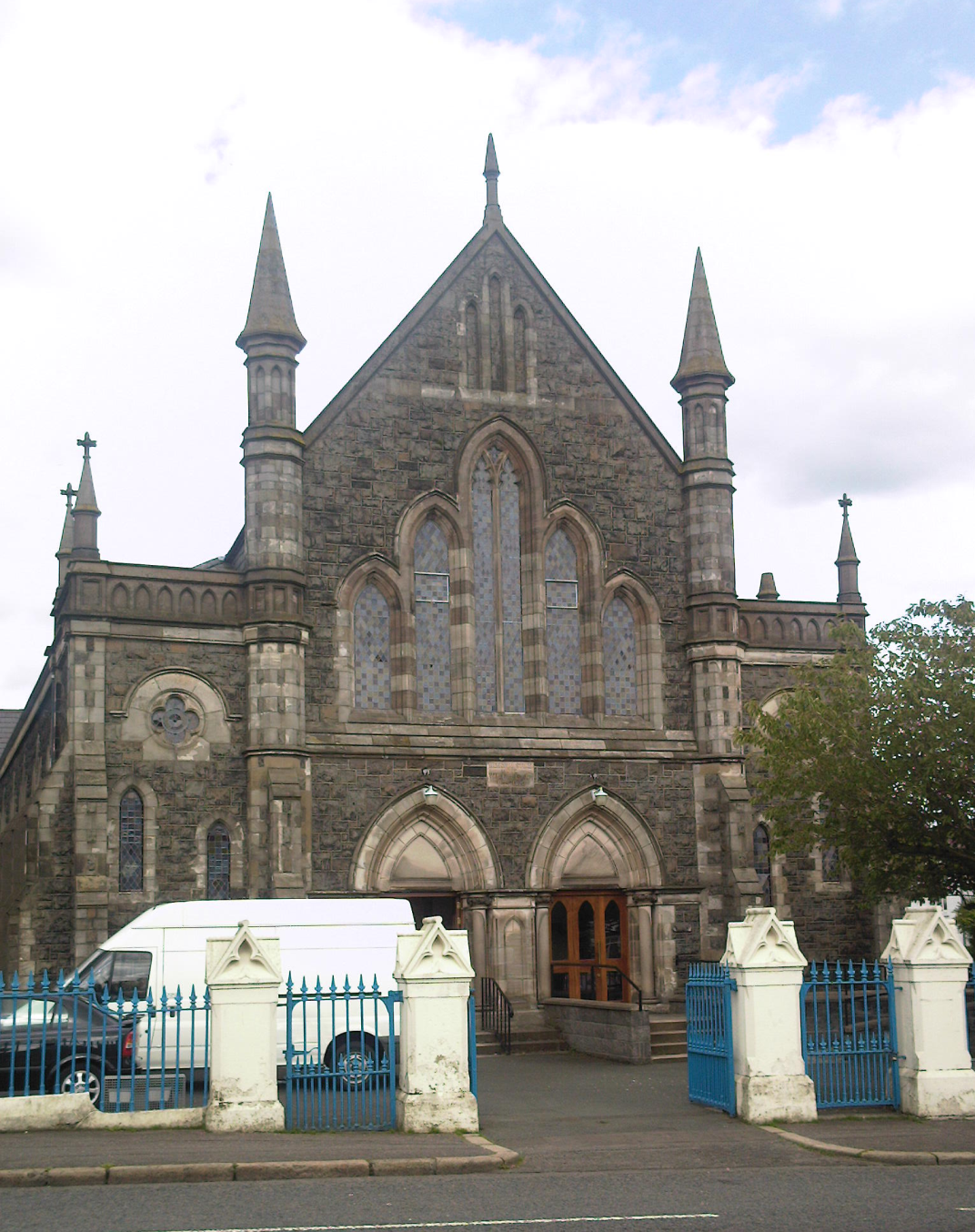
Ballysillan Presbyterian Church

The Ballysillan Road leads off the Crumlin Road and is a major area of housing, containing the Silverstream and Carr's Glen districts. The Ballysillan Road continues as far as the North Circular Road, which, in turn, links to the Antrim Road, which also began at Carlisle Circus. During the Northern Ireland Troubles Ballysillan was noted as a centre for loyalist paramilitary activity and was the home base of "D Company" of the Ulster Volunteer Force (UVF) under the command of John Bingham. Along with Glenbryn, Ballysillan was also at the centre of a loyalist feud in 2003 when Jimbo Simpson, who had recently been ousted as head of the North Belfast Brigade of the Ulster Defence Association (UDA), attacked a number of houses in the area as part of a failed attempt to retake control of the Brigade and force out his replacement William Borland. The Crumlin Road entrance to Ballysillan houses another historic church, the Ballysillan Presbyterian Church. Due to its elevated and exposed location Ballysillan, which takes its name from an Irish language expression meaning "townland of the willow grove", is one of the coldest areas of the city during winter.

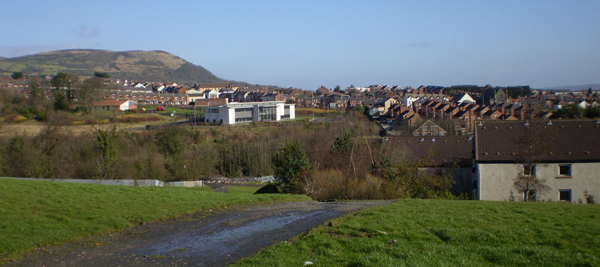
Ballysillan, as viewed from Glencairn

Further up the road, in what is still part of Ballysillan but what is frequently known as Glenbank, another interface area is found around Ligoniel Road and the area known as Legoniel (the road is spelt Ligoniel, whilst the electoral ward is spelt Legoniel, despite referring to the same area). Glenbank remains predominantly loyalist whilst much of Legoniel is republican and was noted as an area of Provisional Irish Republican Army activity during the Troubles. The 1971 Scottish soldiers' killings, in which three members of the British Army were killed by the PIRA, took place in this area. There is a small area of shops on the Crumlin Road around the base of the Ligoniel Road as well as an Elim Pentecostal Church. The Ligoniel Road, which changes its name to the Ballyhill Road soon after it leaves the urban area, eventually joins the A52 close to RAF Nutts Corner.

The upper end of the Crumlin Road is much less densely populated with much of the road passing through fields and wilderness areas, although the road continues to overlook the estates of Ballysillan on lower lands below the upper Crumlin Road. The road turns sharply near the entrance to Cavehill Country Park, veering in a south-westerly direction towards Crumlin. At this juncture the Upper Hightown Road forks off, ultimately linking the area with the Glengormley area of Newtownabbey. From this point on the Crumlin Road continues for around a mile and a half through a largely rural area before merging with the Ballyutoag Road.

== The A52 ==
The Crumlin Road forms the Belfast section of the A52, an A road linking the city to Crumlin, County Antrim. The A52 is known by a number of street names with it changing from the Crumlin Road to Ballyutoag Road (from Irish Baile Uchtóg, meaning 'Townland of the slopes') once it leaves the urban area. It is subsequently known as the Ballykeel Road (from Irish Baile Caol, meaning 'Narrow Townland') and then the Belfast Road until the junction with the A26 in Crumlin. It continues as the Nutts Corner Road into the centre of Crumlin.

== Politics ==
Crumlin Road is part of the North Belfast parliamentary constituency and its Assembly equivalent. In the House of Commons it is represented by John Finucane of Sinn Féin whilst in the Northern Ireland Assembly the MLAs are Gerry Kelly and Carál Ní Chuilín of Sinn Féin, Philip Brett and Brian Kingston of the DUP, and the Alliance's Nuala McAllister. Long-serving DUP MLA Nelson McCausland failed to get re-elected to the constituency in the 2017 Northern Ireland Assembly election and the SDLP's Nichola Mallon in the 2022 Northern Ireland Assembly election.

== The Troubles ==
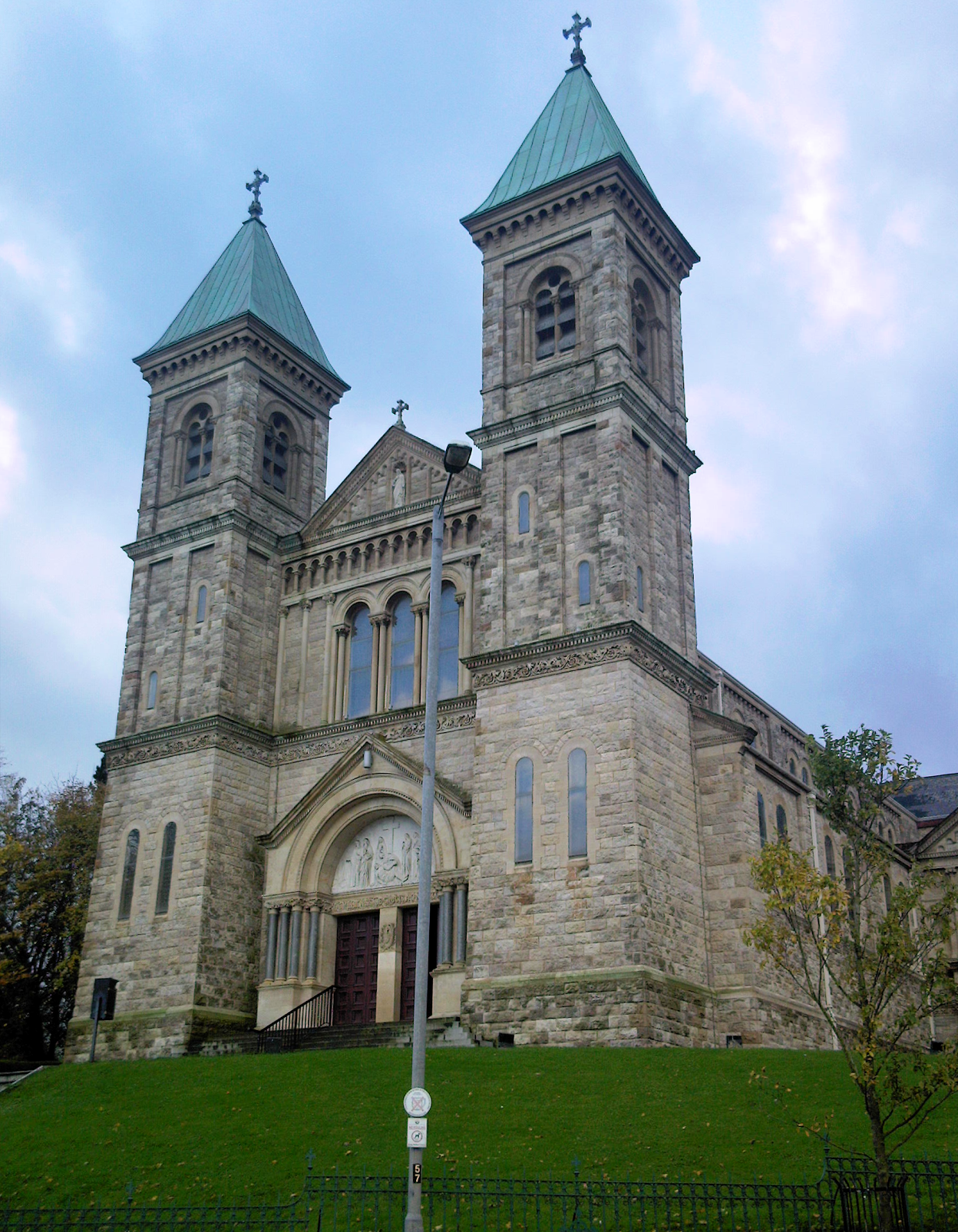
Holy Cross Church, scene of a body find in 1986

As an interface area containing considerable Protestant and Catholic populations the Crumlin Road was the scene of a number of murders and attacks during the course of the Northern Ireland Troubles.

A series of attacks occurred on the road in 1972, mainly carried out by loyalist groups. The Red Hand Commando murdered two Catholic civilians on the road, one on 8 February and another on 11 November. In between the UVF, with which group was closely linked, murdered a Catholic on 15 April whilst on 30 November the UDA killed another Catholic outside the Mater Hospital. Meanwhile, on 21 July 1972, as part of its Bloody Friday series of bomb attacks, the PIRA exploded a device at a petrol station on the road, albeit without deaths. A further PIRA attack occurred on 19 November 1974 when gunmen entered a glazier's shop and shot Jim Anderson and fellow UDA veteran Billy Hull. Although both were wounded neither man died in the attack.

Activity continued and on 21 March 1975 a Protestant civilian died four months after being shot by the UVF during a bank robbery on the road whilst on 10 June a UVF member was killed by the PIRA in his shop. The following year the UDA killed two Catholics on a bus on 17 June whilst on 28 October a joint operation by the UVF and UDA saw gunmen enter the Mater Hospital where they shot and killed former Sinn Féin vice-president Máire Drumm who was a patient at the time.

During the failed 1977 Ulster Workers' Council strike UDA member Kenny McClinton boarded a bus on which he shot dead Harry Bradshaw, a Protestant who was driving the vehicle. Following the killing the UDA wrote to his widow Sheila Bradshaw stating that they were sorry for the murder and that they believed her husband to be a Catholic, enclosing a ten-pound note as compensation. However, according to Martin Dillon the attack had been ordered by leading UDA figure James Craig who knew that any Citybus driver on the Crumlin Road would be a Protestant. Craig wanted to send out a message to other Protestant bus drivers that their failure to support the strike as they had done in 1974 was not going unnoticed. On 10 May an off-duty Ulster Defence Regiment soldier was killed by a UVF bomb at a petrol station on the road. This attack was also linked to the strike as the petrol station had continued to trade during the stoppage.

On 16 September 1986 a Catholic civilian was shot and killed on the grounds of the Holy Cross Church in an attack claimed by the "Protestant Action Force", a UVF cover name. The murder was said to be in retaliation for the killing of UVF member John Bingham two days earlier. With tit-for-tat killings become the norm the Crumlin Road saw evidence of this strategy by republican and loyalist groups in 1987. On 3 July a Catholic civilian, who had formerly been an internee, was found dead at a disused quarry off the Upper Crumlin Road after being murdered by the "Ulster Freedom Fighters". Four days later a member of this group was killed by the PIRA in a Ligoniel Road snooker hall.

The road became associated with UVF activity and in February 1988 a UVF arms haul, containing an RPG7 rocket launcher with 26 warheads, 38 assault rifles, 15 Brownings, 100 grenades and 40,000 rounds of ammunition was found following searches in the Upper Crumlin Road. The UVF killed a further Catholic civilian on the road on 2 September 1989 but had one of their own gunmen shot and killed by the British Army immediately after the attack. On 20 December 1992 the UVF killed a Catholic at his Upper Crumlin Road home whilst on 12 May 1994 the UFF killed another Catholic, this time at the home of a relative.

Activity slowed down considerably following the 1994 ceasefires although attacks linked to loyalist feuds have been recorded. In 1997 Ulster Independence Movement politician Clifford Peeples had his Crumlin Road flower shop ransacked in an attack that he blamed on UVF members. Peeples, a former UVF member, had left the movement and become associated with the Loyalist Volunteer Force (LVF), a splinter group involved in a feud with the UVF. The UVF struck again on 21 August 2000 when two loyalists associated with UDA brigadier Johnny Adair, Jackie Coulter and Bobby Mahood, were shot and killed whilst sitting in a jeep on the Crumlin Road. Adair had moved to support the LVF in their struggles with the UVF, resulting in a feud developing between his UDA West Belfast Brigade and the UVF. Later that year on 24 September Stephen McKeag, a former associate of Adair's who had fallen out of favour, was found dead at his home at Florence Court off the Crumlin Road on 24 September 2000. It was initially speculated that Adair had had McKeag killed although a post-mortem revealed his death was caused by an overdose of painkillers and cocaine. Some of his supporters continued to blame Adair however, and claimed that Adair's men had entered the house, attacked McKeag and forced him to swallow a lethal dose of cocaine, although no evidence to support the claim existed.

== Noted residents ==
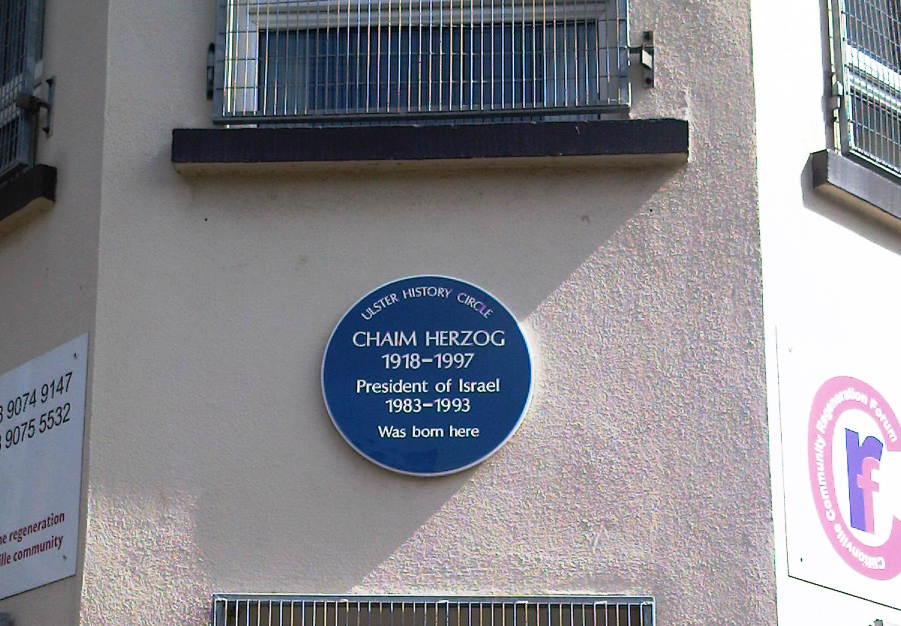
Blue plaque on Chaim Herzog's birth house

Chaim Herzog, who served as President of Israel, was born on Clifton Park Avenue, just off the lower Crumlin Road. His birthplace is marked by a blue plaque erected by the Ulster History Circle.

Ulster Defence Association brigadier Johnny Adair also grew up around this area, as he was born on the Old Lodge Road and raised on the lower Oldpark Road, both of which are adjacent to the Crumlin Road. Another leading figure in the movement, Jim Anderson, who was a founder member of the Woodvale Defence Association, was a Crumlin Road native. His contemporaries in the group's early days Sammy Smyth and Ernie Elliott also both came from streets immediately adjacent to the Crumlin Road. Adair's contemporary Stephen McKeag was living in a street off the road when he was found dead in 2000. William Borland, who served as leader of the UDA's North Belfast Brigade, was also based on the Crumlin Road during his tenure as brigadier.

On the republican side John Graham was a leading member of St Mary's Church of Ireland on the Crumlin Road, as well as being an Irish Republican Army activist.
