= David Vogel =

David Vogel may refer to:

- David Vogel (author) (1891–1944), Russian-born Hebrew poet, novelist, and diarist
- David Vogel (professor) (born 1949), professor of political science and business at UC Berkeley

== See also ==
- David Fogel (disambiguation)
