= Eddie Sayers =

Brigadier of the Ulster Defence Association (1941–2025)

Eddie Sayers (1941 – 29 November 2025) was a Northern Irish loyalist who served as brigadier of the Ulster Defence Association's (UDA) Mid Ulster Brigade in the 1980s.

Sayers ran a small business in Omagh, County Tyrone, and became involved in unionist politics, joining Ian Paisley's Democratic Unionist Party (DUP). He stood for the party in Mid Ulster at the 1973 Northern Ireland Assembly election, taking 4,454 first-preference votes, but was unsuccessful.

In the late 1970s, Sayers left the DUP and became active in the paramilitary Ulster Defence Association (UDA). He was quickly appointed Brigadier of its Mid Ulster Brigade. He stood for election to Omagh District Council in 1981, as an independent unionist, but came bottom of the poll, with only 74 votes. He also ran Borderline Security, which acted as a front for the UDA. Within the UDA he became noted as a close comrade of overall leader Andy Tyrie.

In 1987, the investigative journalist Roger Cook filmed Sayers attempting to extort money from a reporter posing as a businessman. This was broadcast the following year as an episode of The Cook Report, and was considered embarrassing by the UDA, not least because it showed Sayers struggling with basic arithmetic. In the immediate aftermath of the broadcast the UDA announced that Sayers had been removed from his position, although in fact he remained as Brigadier in Mid-Ulster until he was arrested sometime later. He was tried at Belfast Crown Court in 1989, and sentenced to ten years in prison.

While in the Maze prison, Sayers studied to become a legal clerk. He was released in 1999, and gained employment at Taylor & Co solicitors in Belfast. In this role, he worked on legal cases for Johnny Adair, but his employer lost his licence to practice law in 2003, while facing bankruptcy proceedings. In 2005, Sayers was charged with the theft of more than £700,000, and of dishonestly obtaining a mortgage.

In 2006, Sayers was declared personally bankrupt for failing to pay overdue taxes, while, in 2009, he was fined for leaving waste on land in County Fermanagh, despite orders to clean up the site. Sayers died on 29 November 2025.
