= Ernie Elliott =

Northern Irish loyalist activist

Ernest Elliott
- Born: 1943/1944
- Died: 6 December 1972 (aged 28); Northern Ireland
- Cause of death: Homicide
- Other names: "Ernie", "Duke"
- Occupation: Northern Irish loyalist activist
- Known for: Leading member of the Ulster Defence Association

Ernest "Ernie" Elliott (1943/1944 – 6 December 1972), nicknamed "Duke", was a Northern Irish loyalist activist and a leading member of the Ulster Defence Association (UDA) during its early days. Unusually for the generally right-wing UDA, Elliott expressed admiration for socialism and communism, and frequently quoted the words of Che Guevara and Karl Marx. Elliott was eventually killed by a fellow UDA member following a drunken brawl, although his death was variously blamed on republicans and a rival faction within the UDA.

== Woodvale Defence Association ==
A native of Leopold Street close to the Crumlin Road in the Woodvale area, a district of Belfast adjacent to the Shankill Road, Elliott was involved in the formation of the vigilante group the Woodvale Defence Association (WDA) in early 1971. He was appointed as lieutenant to the WDA's deputy leader Davy Fogel, a close drinking buddy. Elliott, a short but stockily built man, was a notorious "hard man" on the Shankill who was used to meting out physical violence. He became commander of the WDA (which retained an independent existence for a time despite its incorporation into the UDA) in 1972 while Charles Harding Smith was detained in London on gun-running charges, holding the rank of Lieutenant-Colonel.

== Marxism ==
At the time the leader of the Ulster Volunteer Force (UVF) Gusty Spence had begun to develop ideas that loyalism should move to a more left-wing position after discussions with Official IRA members in Crumlin Road Gaol. Spence's ideas were rejected by many within the UVF but some who had been in prison with him took the ideas on board. Some of these Shankill UVF men were friends of Elliott and when they discussed their ideas with him he became impressed. Before long Elliott had become enamoured of Marxism and sought to apply its theories to the "loyalist struggle". In fact Elliott and Davy Fogel had held meetings with the Official Irish Republican Army in both Dublin and Belfast in an attempt to seek common ground and explore the possibility of reaching what Fogel described as "a working-class accommodation with our Catholic neighbours". They also met representatives of the British and Irish Communist Organisation which at the time was going through a strongly anti-republican and pro-unionist phase.

Elliott became somewhat notorious in the UDA for expressing the notion that Protestants and Catholics were both equal victims of oppression and that the working class elements of the communities had more in common with each other than their respective middle classes. However, despite his avowed conversion to Marxism, Elliott remained active in the UDA's campaign of sectarian murder and after his death was identified as having taken part in the torture of Patrick Devaney, a Catholic former British Army soldier who was brutally killed on 30 August 1972. His professed views were also not shared by many of his fellow WDA members, with 1 May 1972 issue of WDA News including an article that featured far right calls for racial purity.

== Internal tensions ==
Some of his underlings took to his new ideas but for most within the arch-conservative UDA, including the leadership, Elliott's flirtation with Marxism was dangerously subversive. The British Intelligence Corps, which considered the UDA no threat to their interests, were also deeply worried by Elliott's new interests. In particular they feared the possibility of a relationship developing between elements of the UDA and the Official IRA.

As a consequence, the military authorities decided that it was imperative to remove Elliott and so they enlisted loyalist veteran and British agent William McGrath to lead a whispering campaign designed at blackening Elliott's name. Charles Harding Smith returned to Belfast in December 1972 and was informed by his allies in the WDA that in his absence the UDA in West Belfast had become closely involved in racketeering. They added that not only had Elliott done nothing to stop this crime wave, but that he had also reaped financial benefits from activities such as hijacking trucks carrying alcohol and selling the goods in shebeens. Harding Smith called a meeting of Shankill commanders, inviting all but Elliott, ordering a cleaning up of UDA activities. Those present, many of whom had themselves been involved in the crimes, all placed the blame on Elliott.

== Death ==
On 7 December 1972 a car was found abandoned near the Village area of the Donegall Road with a cardboard box in the back. Police and the army were called to the scene where they initially treated it as a bomb, carrying out a controlled explosion. However, when the box was finally removed from the car it was found to contain not a bomb but rather a corpse, which was soon identified as that of Elliott. He had been blasted in the face with a shotgun.

Another UDA member, who was not identified, was discovered in Ainsworth Avenue on the Woodvale Road with serious injuries and under questioning revealed a story of Elliott's death. He claimed that he and Elliott had been drinking in the UDA clubs of the Shankill Road and had then driven in their official WDA car to Sandy Row to continue drinking. According to his testimony they had taken a short cut past the lower Falls Road where they had been stopped by a Provisional IRA roadblock. The republicans recognised Elliott and separated the two men, beating up Elliott's companion but shooting the WDA leader dead.

The Royal Ulster Constabulary (RUC) rejected the story and publicly declared it had no faith in the testimony. They claimed that no UDA member would ever drive along the Falls to get to Sandy Row and added that the Provisionals would never have killed one member and let another off with a beating. The police added that they believed Elliott had actually been killed on the Shankill and that his companion had been released after being assaulted with instructions to relay the story he had told them. Within days Joseph Kelly, 47, and James Joseph Reynolds, 16, both Catholic civilians, had been killed by the East Belfast UDA in revenge for the killing of Elliott, after the eastern leadership claimed to have accepted the IRA story as truth.

A further story was circulated that Elliott had been killed for being a member of the Ulster Citizens Army, a purported Marxism-supporting loyalist paramilitary group which had been up concocted by the British Intelligence Corps in an ultimately successful attempt to strangle at birth the UVF's move to the left. In fact, Elliott's death had been the result of a drunken brawl that ended in gunfire. Elliott, a notoriously heavy drinker, had gone to Sandy Row to get a gun that he had loaned to a local UDA member. According to witnesses, the heavily inebriated Elliott entered the UDA club in the area and began waving a gun around. A patron of the club grabbed the weapon and punched Elliott with the fight spilling outside. An unidentified Sandy Row UDA man pointed a shotgun at Elliott outside but the weapon went off and hit Elliott. The gunman fled to England soon afterwards only to return in 1983, reportedly remorseful, and confessed his part in the killing. Despite this, no convictions were made after the case against this man and two associates collapsed.

Elliott was 28 years old at the time of his death.

His funeral a few days after his killing was a big event on the Shankill. His coffin was removed from his Leopold Street home draped in a UDA flag, his badges of rank and his Orange Order sash, with shots fired by a guard of honour and thousands of uniformed UDA members marching with the coffin down the Shankill Road. The UDA members, dressed in khaki combat jackets, marched as far Royal Avenue in Belfast city centre. Elliott is commemorated by a mural on Ohio Street off the Woodvale/Upper Shankill roads.
