= Fogel =

Fogel is a surname of Yiddish/German origin, a phonetic transliteration of the German word/surname Vogel, "bird". Notable people with the surname include:

- Aaron Fogel (born 1947), American poet
- Alice B. Fogel, American poet, writer, and professor
- Arthur Fogel, Canadian music executive and concert tour organizer
- Bryan Fogel, American film director
- Daniel Mark Fogel (born 1948), President of the University of Vermont
- David B. Fogel (born 1964), American computer scientist
- Davy Fogel (born 1945), British soldier
- Eric Fogel (born 1969), American director, writer, producer, and voice actor
- Herbert Allan Fogel (1929–2002), American judge
- Horace Fogel (1861–1928), American baseball manager
- Jeremy Fogel (born 1949), American judge
- Jerry Fogel (1936–2019), American actor
- Lawrence J. Fogel (1928–2007), pioneer in evolutionary computation
- Robert Fogel (1926–2013), American economic historian and scientist
- Seymour Fogel (1911–1984), American artist
- Silvio Fogel (1949–2016), Argentine football player
- Steven Fogel (born 1951), British lawyer
- Vladimir Fogel (1902–1929), Russian silent film actor
