= Woodvale Defence Association =

Vigilante group in Belfast, Northern Ireland

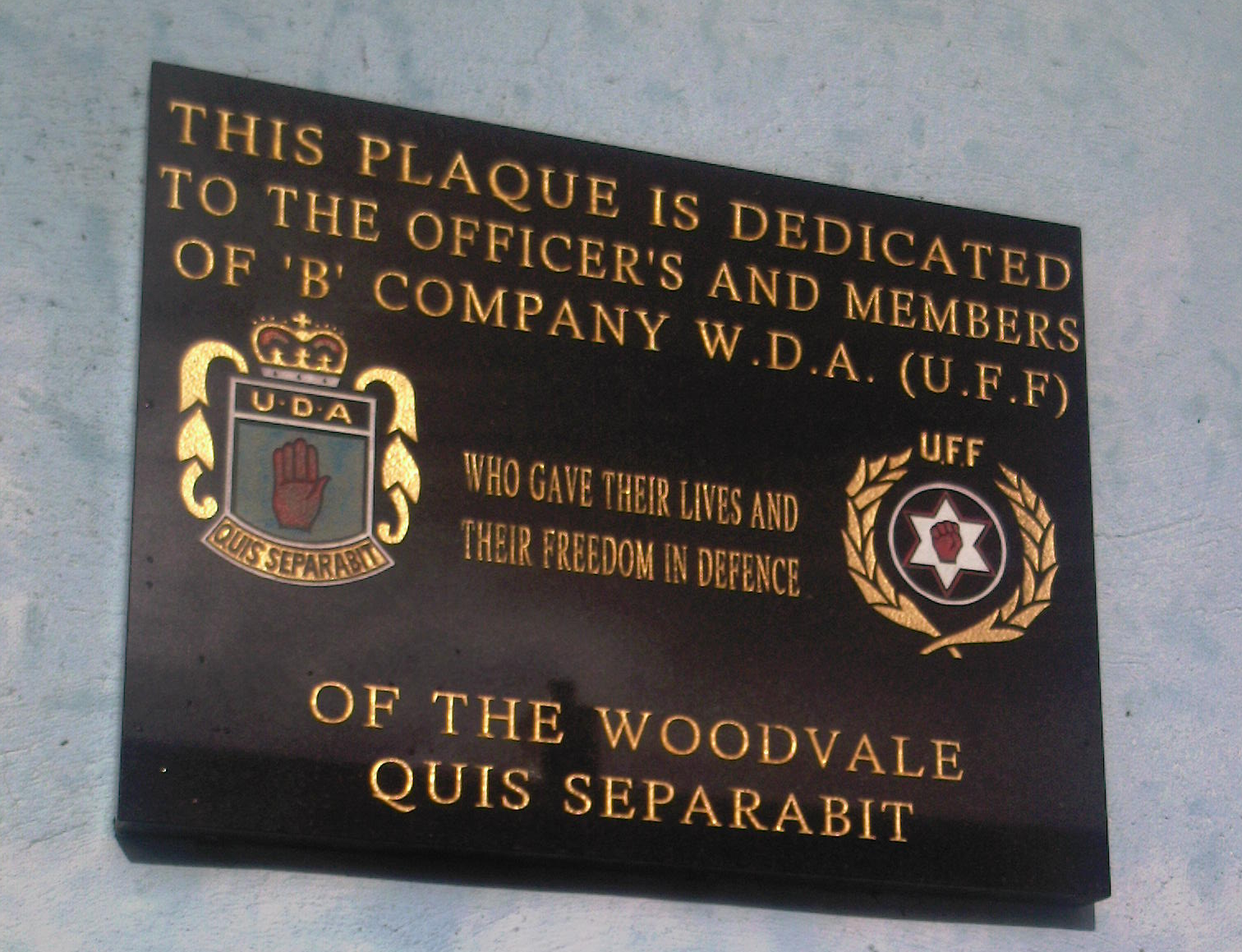
Plaque commemorating the organisation in the Woodvale area, October 2011

The Woodvale Defence Association (WDA) was an Ulster loyalist vigilante group in the Woodvale district of Belfast, an area immediately to the north of the Shankill Road.

The organisation grew from a few smaller vigilante groups. It initially met in a pigeon fancier's club on Leopold Street, a location found on the initiative of Charles Harding Smith, who kept some birds. Sources differ on its actual date of foundation; many claim it was founded in 1969, around the same time as the Shankill Defence Association, which covered a neighbouring area, but Ian Wood's detailed study of the Ulster Defence Association dates its origin to June 1970, when a loyalist pipe band on the Springfield Road was attacked by Catholic protesters, leading to a riot.

The WDA was initially led by Alan Moon, with Sammy Smyth acting as its main spokesman, although Moon was soon replaced by Harding Smith. Initial membership of the WDA was primarily middle-aged and disinclined to take violent action. However, Davy Fogel interrupted an early meeting to call for members to receive military training. Harding Smith instructed him to start this, members bringing both legally held guns and dummy weapons.

In 1971, many local loyalist groups merged to form the Ulster Defence Association. Its core components were the Woodvale and the Shankill Defence Associations, the Woodvale organisation being the largest of its forerunners. The new organisation was a loose confederation, and the Woodvale group continued to publish a newsletter, the WDA News. Its 1 May 1972 issue carried a notorious article justifying genocide against Roman Catholics and calling for racial purity. When the UDA was restructured, the WDA became its "B" Company.

Several leading members of the UDA started out in the WDA, including Jim Anderson, Davy Payne, Ernie Elliott and John White.
