= Davy Fogel =

Formal loyalist

- Born: David Fogel; 1945 (age 80–81); London, England
- Other name: Big Dave
- Occupations: Soldier, machinist
- Known for: Senior member of the Woodvale Defence Association (1970–1971) and the Ulster Defence Association (1971–1973)

David "Davy" Fogel, also known as "Big Dave" (born 1945), was a former loyalist and a leading member of the loyalist vigilante Woodvale Defence Association (WDA) which later merged with other groups becoming the Ulster Defence Association (UDA). Born in London, Fogel was a former Royal Army Ordnance Corps soldier who had served in Northern Ireland before marrying a local Belfast woman and settling down with his family in Woodvale, Belfast.

In June 1970 at a pigeon fanciers' club, he militarised the Woodvale Defence Association (WDA) and trained them as a military unit. He continued to instruct the new UDA recruits in military tactics and gave lectures on Army and police interrogation methods and urban guerrilla fighting. He was the second-in-command to the WDA's leader and the UDA's first commander, Charles Harding Smith. Fogel was the leader of the UDA's B Company, 2nd Battalion, West Belfast Brigade and enjoyed much prestige in 1972, having erected the first UDA street barricades and roadblocks in Woodvale. He left the organisation early in 1973 after he was ousted from power during an internal feud.

== Early life ==
Fogel was born in London, England and first arrived in Northern Ireland as a private in the Royal Army Ordnance Corps in 1965. His job in the Army was to look after weapon stores; this is where he first became acquainted with guns and learned how to use them. When he left the Army in 1968, he married a Protestant girl from Belfast, and settled down with her in a modest house in Palmer Street in the Woodvale area of west Belfast, located at the top of the Shankill Road. Palmer Street was close to the interface with the nationalist Ardoyne area and had been one of the worst hit streets in a series of riots that blighted this interface area. He worked as a machinist in Mackie's engineering plant until he was made redundant in 1970. Thereafter he found casual work and collected unemployment benefits.

== Woodvale Defence Association ==
Fogel first became involved in the loyalist vigilante group the Woodvale Defence Association (WDA) in late June 1970 at a meeting held in a pigeon fanciers' club on Leopold Street just off the Crumlin Road. He had gone to the meeting following the Battle of St Matthew's. Three Protestants had been killed, and this had made such a strong impression on Fogel that he wanted to take direct action against the nationalist Catholic community. When Fogel interrupted the meeting, shouting out that "talk was not enough", the WDA's leader Charles Harding Smith asked him to "put some order" into the men and give them military training.

Fogel took up Harding Smith's suggestion and quickly became his second-in-command. In a candid interview with British journalist Peter Taylor, Fogel stated

The first thing I did was to tell each likely man to find one more reliable man. Then I did the same with them. That way we got a decent number – about forty. I began to train the men as a military unit. We marched and drilled and used a field out in Antrim for some training – crawling over the grass, up rope ladders, hand-to-hand-combat, target practice. I showed them how to make fire bombs. We also carved wooden guns for our training. ... But it would be dishonest to pretend that real guns didn't exist.

He enjoyed the important position he held within the WDA, acknowledging that he "walked around the streets with the power of life and death over people". In September 1971, the WDA and other vigilante groups merged into the umbrella paramilitary organisation known as the Ulster Defence Association (UDA) with Charles Harding Smith as its first commander and Fogel as the second most powerful man in the organisation. He continued to train the new recruits to the local Woodvale UDA unit, of which there were many. According to author Ian S. Wood, Fogel admitted the following: "I taught them about unarmed combat – you know, how to break a nose, burst an ear drum, dislocate a spine." He also gave them lectures on guerrilla fighting and the methods of interrogation employed by British security forces in Northern Ireland.

== Role within the UDA ==
The UDA saw its first gun battle with the Provisional IRA in December 1971. Shortly afterwards, the British government suspended the Parliament of Northern Ireland and imposed direct rule from London. When Harding Smith and John White had gone to London to purchase arms and were subsequently arrested in April 1972 for gun-running, Jim Anderson, a glazier from Crumlin Road, assumed command of the UDA. It was structured along military lines into battalions, companies, platoons, and sections and had continued to draw new members within its ranks, becoming the largest loyalist paramilitary organisation, having about 50,000 members in 1972. The UDA was legal at the time; it remained so until 1992 when it was eventually proscribed by the government. Fogel took control of west Belfast during Harding Smith's absence, and became leader of the UDA's B Company which covered the Woodvale area.

At the end of May, Fogel organised the first UDA roadblocks and barricades, sealing off the Woodvale area into a "no go" zone which the UDA controlled. Anderson, the de facto commander approved of his action and gave Fogel his full support, and the operation attracted much media and press coverage. Time magazine described him as a "tough, salty Londoner" who commanded the Woodvale Defence Association. In an interview with Time journalists, Fogel spoke of his contempt for the middle-class politicians that made up the Ulster Unionist Party. In June, he and two other of his associates drove to Stormont to negotiate with the Secretary of State for Northern Ireland, William Whitelaw, who made it clear to Fogel and the others his strong disapproval of their erection of permanent street barricades.

His fellow members in attendance at the meeting were Tommy Herron and Billy Hull. Fogel had been a strong advocate of sealing off streets linking to nationalist areas and in July 1972 advocated shutting off Ainsworth Avenue even though it would have meant some fifty Catholic families living on the street would be cut off from the Springfield Road and held within the Shankill. When the plan became known, William Whitelaw was called on by Ainsworth Avenue Catholics and British Army troops under the command of Major-General Robert Ford were sent to the area, where a stand-off with the UDA ensued. In the street negotiations it was agreed that, despite what Whitelaw had stated in the previous meeting, the UDA could erect small temporary barriers and loose plans were put in place for joint UDA-Army patrols, something that the UDA leadership announced at a press conference in the Europa Hotel that same night.

That same month the UDA marched through the city centre of Belfast in a massive show of strength. Fogel's power in west Belfast rose and as a result he received many visitors to his home which included American congressmen. It was at that time he received his nickname "Big Dave". He also hired two bodyguards to look after him. He later described his role within the UDA during 1972 as having been a "bit of a policeman, magistrate and welfare worker". He often presided over unofficial UDA courts where local offenders from the community were tried. If found guilty, the culprits were given punishment beatings. At the end of the summer of 1972, Fogel, emerging leader Andy Tyrie, and other UDA leaders met with an Army general to discuss the issue of street barricades. By the end of that year, the UDA and their loyalist rivals, the Ulster Volunteer Force (UVF), had carried out 121 killings that they called "assassinations. About two-thirds were Catholic victims of what republicans would term "loyalist death squads".

== Fall from power ==
Following Harding Smith's release from imprisonment and subsequent return to Belfast, there was a power struggle within the UDA. Harding Smith had declared to his men upon his return: "I'm the boss. I take orders from no one". Harding Smith became joint Chairman of the UDA with Jim Anderson while Fogel was interested in taking the organisation down a political path. He, along with UDA "enforcer" Ernie "Duke" Elliott, even had meetings with the Official Irish Republican Army (OIRA) in Dublin in an attempt to seek common ground and explore the possibility of reaching a working-class settlement with Catholics.

On 7 December 1972, Elliott's body was discovered in the boot of Fogel's car; the outcome of the internal UDA feud. He had been killed by a shotgun blast to the face. Rumours circulated that Elliott had been killed because he was a Marxist, something frowned upon in loyalism, and Fogel confirmed that Elliott had been a keen reader of the works of Che Guevara. However it later emerged that Elliott, a heavy drinker, had gone to Sandy Row, a loyalist stronghold in south Belfast, to pick up a gun and whilst drunk had pointed it at patrons of the local UDA club. He was taken outside by a local UDA member and the two had a fight over the gun. Other local UDA men got involved and one of them pointed a shotgun at Elliott in an attempt to get him to back off but the gun went off killing Elliott instantly. The shooter fled to England but returned in 1983 and confessed his role in the death, also confirming that it had all been a drunken brawl which at no point involved any ideological concerns.

Fogel believed he was being set up by his associates and before long Harding Smith moved against him. Fogel was accused of embezzling funds from the UDA by Harding Smith, who also claimed that a senior Army officer had warned him that Fogel was, in some unspecified manner, a danger to the UDA and an informer. Fogel was even taken into custody by Harding Smith's men for a three-hour period during which he was warned that he must leave the Shankill. When Tommy Herron, the formidable East Belfast brigadier and the UDA's vice-chairman and spokesman, appeared on the scene to challenge Harding Smith's leadership, Fogel was ousted from his position of power. Fearing there would be an attempt on his life, Fogel left the UDA and Northern Ireland for good in January 1973, transferring to England for a life of safe obscurity. Immediately before he left, Fogel had been summoned to a "meeting" in an East Belfast UDA club and decided to leave before it was due to take place, fearing he would be walking into an ambush.

Later that year Tommy Herron was shot dead, Jim Anderson had voluntarily stood down, and Andy Tyrie was appointed chairman. Tyrie, an early recruit from the WDA, soon became the UDA's Supreme Commander, a position he would hold until March 1988 when an attempted car-bombing brought about his retirement. Less than four months before on 27 December 1987, the Provisional IRA had succeeded in blowing up influential South Belfast brigadier John McMichael in a booby-trap car bomb outside his home. Charles Harding Smith was long out of the picture. From 1973 to 1975, he had tried in vain to wrest the UDA leadership from Tyrie; finally he had been forced to leave Northern Ireland after surviving several assassination attempts by republicans and by members of the pro-Tyrie faction.

Fogel's final involvement came just after he left Belfast when two journalists from the Sunday Times were brought to his home in southern England for an interview. In the course of the interview, Fogel informed them that the UDA had already imported several shipments of illegal arms, including one brought through the Port of Dublin. The revelations caused alarm among the UDA leadership as they were still presenting themselves as law-abiding and feared the organisation might face legal sanctions if their stockpiling of weapons came out.
