= Charles Harding Smith =

Northern Irish loyalist

- Born: 24 January 1931; Belfast, Northern Ireland
- Died: 1997 (aged 65–66); Halifax, England
- Military career
- Allegiance: Ulster Defence Association
- Branch: Woodvale Defence Association; UDA West Belfast Brigade
- Service years: 1971–1975
- Rank: Brigadier
- Conflicts: The Troubles

Charles Harding Smith (24 January 1931 – 1997) was a Northern Irish loyalist and the first effective leader of the Ulster Defence Association (UDA). An important figure in the Belfast-based "defence associations" that formed the basis of the UDA on its formation in 1971, Smith later became embroiled in feuds with other UDA leaders and was eventually driven out of Northern Ireland by his opponents.

== Development of the UDA ==
Smith, a former soldier in the British Army who at the time resided in Rosebank Street on the Shankill Road, called a meeting of other locals at the Leopold Street Pigeon Fanciers Club to develop a response to attacks by republicans from the neighboring Ardoyne area. The location was chosen because Smith was himself a pigeon fancier and a member of the club. At the meeting, it was agreed to establish a vigilante group, the Woodvale Defence Association (WDA), with Smith in command assisted by Davy Fogel, who organised military drilling for the forty or so recruits, and Ernie Elliott.

The WDA gained widespread notoriety and was blamed for a series of bomb attacks and shootings, most of which had been carried out by the Ulster Volunteer Force (UVF). Nevertheless, Smith's reputation as a hardline loyalist was boosted as a result and when his group merged with other similar vigilante movements to form the Ulster Defence Association (UDA) in late 1971 he was chosen as chairman of the new group's thirteen-member Security Council ahead of the other leading candidates Tommy Herron and Jim Anderson. According to journalist Martin Dillon, Smith was heavily influenced by William Craig and William McGrath, both of whom saw a need for a group to replace the Ulster Special Constabulary and felt that they could easily influence Smith to their way of thinking.

Smith soon took charge of procuring arms for the UDA. In early 1972, working in tandem with Belfast businessman John Campbell who agreed to bankroll the purchases, he was put in contact with a Scottish arms dealer from whom Smith was to purchase £50,000 worth of weapons. Smith sent three WDA associates, John White, Bobby Dalzell, and Robert Lusty (who was also a serving officer in the Royal Ulster Constabulary (RUC)), to meet the arms dealer in a London hotel, following them without attending the actual meeting. The "arms dealer" was actually a Special Branch agent and, after recording the conversation with the WDA men, arrested all three. Smith went to Scotland Yard the same day to inquire about his friends only to be arrested himself.

Smith remained in custody in England until December 1972 when his case came to trial. Campbell claimed that the deal had been organised for the RUC to entrap the arms dealer, whom they believed to be a Provisional IRA member and a series of mistakes by the prosecution helped to ensure that the case collapsed with Smith acquitted. The trial was used as part of early arguments regarding collusion between the RUC and loyalists as a list of RUC Special Branch suspects was uncovered in Smith's house while he attempted to call Chief Constable Graham Shillington as a character witness.

== Return to Belfast ==
By the time Smith returned to Belfast in December 1972 there had been changes in the UDA with Tommy Herron in effective control of the organisation and Davy Fogel the dominant figure amongst the WDA. Smith immediately took back control of his west Belfast stronghold, threatening Fogel with death if he didn't fall into line. Fogel, a close ally of Ernie Elliott, who was killed in circumstances that Smith had been rumoured to be involved in, although it was later determined that Elliott was shot dead after a drunken brawl on Sandy Row had descended into a gunfight, decided it was best not to go up against Smith and stood down.

However, Smith was not satisfied and, after putting out intelligence that Fogel had been taking UDA funds for himself, arrested Fogel and held him captive for three hours in a Shankill social club where he was told to leave the area. Fogel briefly left for east Belfast but when the UDA there made it clear he wasn't welcome either he left to live in England, from where he controversially gave an interview about his time in the UDA to The Sunday Times. Among claims made by Fogel in this interview was one that Smith was attempting to take control of the UDA with the help of the UVF. Smith was a strong admirer of the UVF's military structure and hoped to replicate it in the UDA but he had a deep dislike of UVF leader Gusty Spence. As part of his remit to instil military discipline, Smith moved against a culture of racketeering that had become endemic in the west Belfast UDA during his absence. It was this initiative that led to the rumours concerning Smith's involvement in the death of Elliott, who had been named by some of his rivals in the UDA as a gangster.

Despite Smith's show of strength following his return to Belfast his public persona remained low-key, with Herron fast emerging as the public face of the UDA. Much of this was down to the fact that Smith was inarticulate and unable to project a good image, unlike Herron who was a good talker and fairly charismatic. The emergence of these two leaders at the same time however was to bring the fledgling movement into near civil war.

Following a period of marginalisation Jim Anderson, who was serving as caretaker leader of the UDA, had resigned as chairman of the UDA and as a result a meeting was called of the group's leaders in March 1973 to determine who would succeed him. By this time Smith and Herron were recognised as the undisputed leaders of the Belfast UDA; there was a fear that whichever of the two was chosen as chairman the other one would automatically feel obliged to challenge his leadership. As a result, it was determined that someone else should be appointed chairman as a compromise candidate and as Highfield-based activist Andy Tyrie, a man noted for his skill as an organiser, was chairing the conference it was decided that he would be acceptable to both men as chairman of the UDA. Tyrie soon proved to be a powerful rival to the two leaders. In September 1973, Herron was kidnapped and shot dead. As of 2014, his murder remains unsolved.

== Feud ==
Tyrie had not proven to be the puppet Smith had hoped and had consolidated his power through his close involvement with Glenn Barr and the Ulster Workers Council during the strike of May 1974, an event that had helped to give real credence to Tyrie's leadership abilities. Fearing the growing power of Tyrie, Smith criticised the UDA leader for sending a delegation to Libya to meet Muammar al-Gaddafi, who was a hate figure for many loyalists due to his providing arms to the PIRA. Smith, who had known about the trip in advance but had raised no objections, verbally attacked Tyrie over the Libya debacle in a meeting of the Inner Council in December 1974 before declaring the following January that he intended to split his West Belfast Brigade from the rest of the UDA.

Two weeks after announcing the schism Smith was attending a meeting at the West Belfast UDA's headquarters with Tommy Lyttle when he noticed a sniper on a nearby roof. Smith, who was wearing a bullet-proof vest, opened his coat as if to challenge the sniper to fire but was seriously wounded when the sniper did shoot twice, hitting him both times with armour-piercing bullets. With Smith in hospital Tyrie called a meeting of the leading figures in the Shankill UDA and managed to convince Lyttle and other leading figures that Smith was too divisive a figure to remain in charge.

Smith was out of the hospital after only two weeks and declared himself back in charge but before long he had fallen foul of a number of important people. Two Shankill UDA members had been interned on the basis of evidence that rumours suggested had come from Smith whilst he had also clashed with the local UVF after suggesting that they merge but only on the basis that he would be in control. He began to make threats against Barr and Chicken, two popular members who were leading figures on the UDA's political side. Smith called a meeting of his commanders, but, on 6 February 1975, in an attack arranged in advance by his opponents within the UDA, a gunman burst in and shot him twice in the chest. The gunman walked up to the injured Smith and prepared to shoot him in the head but the gun jammed and he again survived an attempt on his life.

== Departure ==
Smith spent another week in hospital after which he again returned to his Belfast home. Loyalist Davy Payne was sent to his house with another hitman and the two ordered Smith to leave Northern Ireland. He was taken to the airport the following day and left for England, leaving Tyrie as sole leader of the UDA. Smith settled in Southowram, West Yorkshire, where he worked as a lorry driver before his death in 1997. During Dáil Éireann debates in 2005 he was named as a "self-confessed British intelligence agent".
