= Lewis Fogle =

American man wrongly convicted in 1982 for the murder of a 15-year-old girl

Lewis "Jim" Fogle is an American man who was wrongly convicted in 1982 for the murder of a 15-year-old girl. Fogle's conviction was vacated on DNA evidence in 2015, after he was forced to spend 34 years in prison for a crime he did not commit.

In July 1975, 15-year-old Deann Katherine "Kathy" Long, of Cherry Tree, Indiana County, Pennsylvania, was raped and murdered by shooting of a firearm, in the head. In March 1981, Police arrested Fogle and alleged that he had raped and killed Long. Fogle was one of four people arrested (Lewis Fogle, his brother Dennis Fogle, Joseph Victor Receskey and John Robert Lynch) at the time in connection with the murder but Fogle was the only person to be tried. Charges against his brother were dismissed because the prosecution violated Pennsylvania's "speedy trial rules" and the cases against Receskey and Lynch were dropped for lack of evidence. There was no physical evidence presented against Fogle at the trial and the prosecution's case was primarily three inmates at the prison where Fogle was incarcerated. They said they had heard Fogle admit to the crime. In 1982, Fogle was convicted of second degree murder and sentenced to life in prison without parole. He continued to claim he was innocent and refused to admit to the crimes he was alleged to have committed. Fogle contacted the Innocence Project, who agreed to examine his case. Lawyers for the Innocence Project were able to get semen found on the victim's body tested for DNA, but it did not match Fogle's, which eventually led to his being released from jail and the subsequent dismissal of charges.

The local District Attorney Patrick Dougherty joined in the motion by the Innocence Project lawyers to vacate his conviction and a Senior Judge vacated Fogle's conviction. In August 2015, at the age of 63, Fogle was finally released from prison after serving 34 years in jail. Of the other original suspects, Receskey died in 2010, Lynch's whereabouts were unknown and Dennis Fogle was sentenced in 2010 to 5 to 10 years in jail for sexually molesting a 15-year-old boy. Dougherty said he would try to get DNA samples from Dennis Fogle and Lynch.

Lewis Fogle was interviewed in 2021 by WPXI. He talks about his experiences after release and help he has received from the Innocence Project. Fogle also filed a lawsuit against 17 parties, including the Indiana County District Attorney’s Office, Indiana County and Pennsylvania State Police.
