= Glenn Barr =

Northern Irish politician (1932–2017)

Glenn Barr OBE
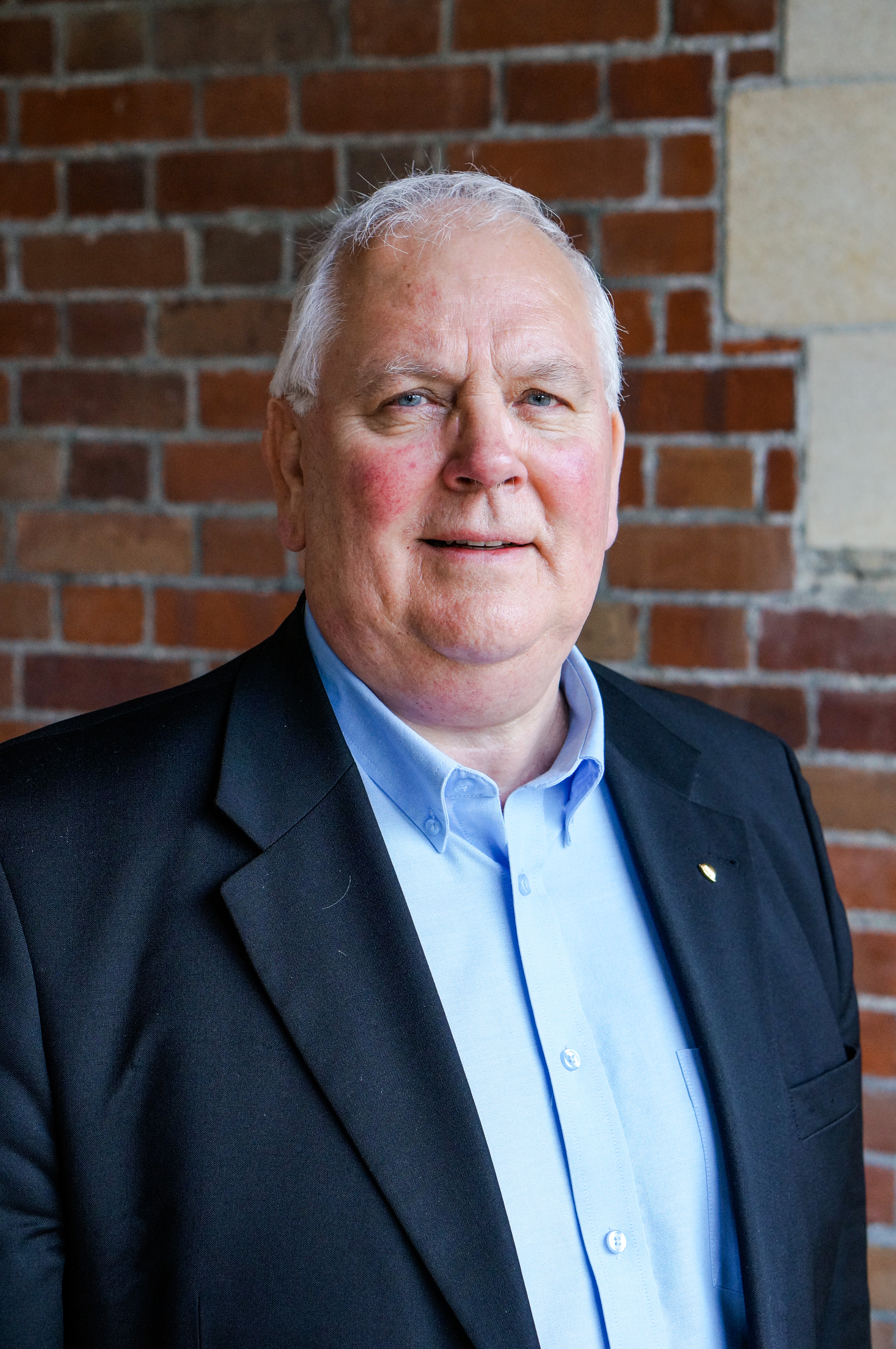
- Born: Albert Glenn Barr; 19 March 1942; Derry, Northern Ireland
- Died: 24 October 2017 (aged 75); Derry, Northern Ireland
- Years active: 1969–2017
- Organization: Ulster Workers' Council
- Known for: Politician, loyalist activist, community worker
- Notable work: Beyond the Religious Divide (co-author)
- Title: Joint Deputy Leader of the Vanguard Unionist Progressive Party
- Term: 1975–1978
- Predecessor: Ernest Baird
- Successor: none
- Political party: Vanguard Unionist Progressive Party
- Military career
- Allegiance: Ulster Defence Association
- Service years: 1971–1975
- Rank: Brigadier
- Commands: North-West Brigade
- Conflict: The Troubles

Albert Glenn Barr OBE (19 March 1942 – 24 October 2017) was a politician from Derry, Northern Ireland, who was an advocate of Ulster nationalism. For a time during the 1970s he straddled both Unionism and Loyalism due to simultaneously holding important positions in the Vanguard Unionist Progressive Party and the Ulster Defence Association.

== UDA ==
Initially a member of a general trade union, Barr first came to prominence at the very start of the Troubles in 1969 when he was involved in an initiative to ensure Protestant workers did not join in strikes called by the Northern Ireland Civil Rights Association. He went on to join the Loyalist Association of Workers in the early 1970s and from there became involved in the Ulster Defence Association (UDA). The loose associations of shop stewards that existed in Derry and the surrounding areas formed the basis of the UDA in this area. Barr served as Brigadier of the North-West Brigade of the UDA, which later became known as the Londonderry and North Antrim Brigade.

== Politics ==
Around this time Barr also became involved in politics by joining the Vanguard Unionist Progressive Party (VPUP) and was elected to the Northern Ireland Assembly, which had been set up under the Sunningdale Agreement, in 1973. As a result, Barr was the only UDA member to serve in either of the two bodies elected in Northern Ireland following the collapse of the Stormont Parliament. However, according to Ian S. Wood it had been Barr's profile as a trade unionist and community worker, rather than any UDA connections, that had won him the election.

He soon became a leading figure in the opposition to Sunningdale agreement and effectively led the Ulster Workers' Council strike that brought about the collapse of the new power-sharing government. Barr was chairman of the Ulster Loyalist Central Co-ordinating Committee, a group containing Ulster Workers' Council representatives, politicians and paramilitaries that directed the strike. He would later comment that it would have been feasible to establish a provisional government for an independent Northern Ireland from this body.

Always something of a maverick within Unionist politics, Barr served a three-month suspension from the United Ulster Unionist Council (UUUC) after endorsing the candidacy of Ken Gibson of the Volunteer Political Party for West Belfast in the October 1974 general election despite the Democratic Unionist Party's John McQuade representing the UUUC. During his suspension Barr was part of a UDA delegation that made a fund-raising trip to Libya where they met with Muammar Gaddafi. Barr claimed when he returned that Gaddafi, who at the time was funding the Provisional IRA, had expressed a firm interest in providing money for an independent Northern Ireland. The trip however, on which Barr was accompanied by Tommy Lyttle, Andy Robinson and Harry Chicken, was widely condemned by unionist politicians because of the purportedly left-wing nature of the Gaddafi regime whilst the same reason was used a basis by Charles Harding Smith to launch a loyalist feud against UDA leader Andy Tyrie, whose idea the trip had been. In the course of this feud, Harding Smith placed Barr under a death threat, although nothing came of this as the pro-Tyrie forces quickly dispatched the challenge of Harding Smith.

When the VPUP split after leader William Craig suggested in the Northern Ireland Constitutional Convention that he would consider a power-sharing arrangement with the Social Democratic and Labour Party Barr was one of the few leading figures to remain loyal to Craig rather than decamping to Ernest Baird's United Ulster Unionist Party. When the UDA intimated that it did not back Craig's position either Barr tendered his resignation from the paramilitary group. Barr, who had exchanged angry words with Ian Paisley on a few occasions when both men were central to the 1974 strike, publicly distanced himself from the attempted strike organised by Paisley's United Unionist Action Council in 1977. Along with David Trimble he became deputy leader of the Vanguard and held this position until the party dissolution in 1978. He, however, did not follow Craig in joining the Ulster Unionist Party and instead returned to his UDA roots.

== Return to UDA activity ==
Barr had been invited back into the UDA after the failure of the second strike, with a feeling within the movement that he had been proven right with his opposition to the failed initiative and so would be an asset politically to the movement. Following the collapse of Vanguard Barr returned to a leading position in the UDA, becoming involved in the New Ulster Political Research Group (NUPRG). Whilst there, Barr took a leading role in the production of Beyond the Religious Divide, a document which sought to set out a framework for a move towards eventual independence for Northern Ireland. Barr became increasingly disillusioned with what he saw as the callousness of unionist politicians towards their electorate, and the blind loyalty of that electorate. He commented: "They could have sent a donkey with a Union Jack tied to its tail up the Shankill Road, and we would have voted for it." Barr was also chosen to break the self-imposed media blackout adopted by the NUPRG in late 1978 when he gave an interview to the Irish political magazine Magill during which he put forward the case for independence.

The UDA, however, failed to recommend the proposals to its members and, as a result, Barr drifted away from the NUPRG, leaving politics altogether in 1981 to return to community work in Derry. Barr also had a somewhat fractious relationship with the NUPRG's chairman John McMichael and following Barr's retirement McMichael changed the group, abandoning Barr's pet project of establishing a cross-community Northern Ireland Negotiated Independence Association, and instead set up the Ulster Loyalist Democratic Party.

== Later years ==
Barr set up a scheme for disadvantaged young people by which they would receive low-wage employment and training under the government ACE scheme (later called the New Deal). Both Barr and Paddy Doherty, who established a similar scheme in the Catholic Bogside area, would eventually face criticism for what became known colloquially "ACE empires" as both employed very high numbers of youths on these poorly paid training schemes.

Barr briefly emerged from his political retirement in 1994 when he joined his old friend from the strike Andy Tyrie in heading up an initiative to gain funding for the Ulster Democratic Party. He appeared set for a more active return in 1998 when he took up a seat on the Parades Commission, a move roundly condemned by nationalists, given Barr's UDA past, and one that saw resignations from the board in protest. Ultimately, however, Barr himself resigned on 24 April 1998, along with loyalist Tommy Cheevers not long after the Commission had banned an Apprentice Boys parade from the nationalist lower Ormeau Road. Barr continued to work on community projects in Derry, running the Maydown Youth Training Project Ltd, which seeks to alleviate the high levels of unemployment amongst the young in the Derry. He had also worked closely with Paddy Harte, a former Irish Government minister, on promoting awareness of Irish Catholic participation in both World Wars.

== Death ==
Barr died at Altnagelvin hospital on 24 October 2017 at the age of 75. DUP MP Gregory Campbell paid tribute to him and the hard work he carried out in the community. Sinn Féin MP Elisha McCallion described him as being "on a journey of reconciliation" and expressed her sorrow at his death. Social Democratic and Labour Party leader Colum Eastwood praised his dedication to peace and reconciliation. He was interred in Altnagelvin cemetery after a service at Ebrington Presbyterian church in Derry.

He was married to Isa, with whom he had four children.

Northern Ireland Assembly (1973)
New assembly	Assembly Member for Londonderry; 1973–1974	Assembly abolished
Northern Ireland Constitutional Convention
New convention	Member for Londonderry; 1975–1976	Convention dissolved
Party political offices
Preceded by Ernest Baird; Lindsay Smyth	Deputy Leader of the Vanguard Unionist Progressive Party; 1975–1978; With: David Trimble	Position abolished
