= Steven Fogel =

- Born: 16 October 1951 (age 75); London
- Occupation: Business and arts adviser
- Fogel's voice recorded December 2015

Steven Fogel (born 1951) is an English former solicitor who, in 2000, as senior partner, led the English law firm, Titmuss Sainer, into one of the first transatlantic law firm mergers. The US firm was Dechert, Price & Rhoades and the combined firm, where he joined the policy committee until 2005 and became managing partner until March 2012, is Dechert. When Fogel left Dechert at the end of 2012 he joined the board of the London-based European law firm SJ Berwin. He served there until 2016 as a non executive and advised on such matters as the combination of that firm with King & Wood Mallesons. He served as a non executive director of classical music management company Harrison Parrott Ltd until June 2024. In May 2019 the film “Raki’a” he co-made with artist Judy Goldhill was shown at the Venice Biennale, and then at WOMAD in July 2019.

== Career ==
Fogel was Board Chair at Sparrows Capital Ltd, a financial services company. He took this on in 2013. He was also a non executive director at Harrison Parrott. Until March 2012, he was managing partner of the London office of Dechert LLP, where he also served for many years as a board member. He was the senior partner at Titmuss Sainer before its merger in 2000. In addition, from 2008 to 2010, he was on the advisory board of surveyors CWM. He represented the British Retail Consortium on the passage of the Landlord & Tenant Act 1995 and was a co-author of PACT, an arbitration scheme for lease renewals. From 2009 until 2023 he was on the advisory board of the Landon Trusts and until 2017 on the University of London's board of trustees. He has also worked with a number of not-for-profit organisations. Currently, these include Hofesh Shechter, the dance company. He is a fellow of the Freud Museum, where his advisory work began in 2010 and ended in 2020. In 2002, he became the first lawyer to be appointed chair of the Investment Property Forum, and was one of the leaders of the campaign to introduce US style real estate investment trusts (REITS) into the UK. He was founding author of the Landlord and Tenant Factbook (Thompson/Sweet & Maxwell and co-author of or contributor to many publications, including Leasehold Liability (Jordans) and the Handbook of Rent Review (Sweet & Maxwell)
