= Andy Tyrie =

Northern Irish loyalist (1940–2025)

- Born: Andrew Tyrie; 5 February 1940; Belfast, Northern Ireland
- Died: 16 May 2025 (aged 85); Belfast, Northern Ireland
- Education: Brown Square School
- Occupation: Gardener
- Employer: Belfast City Council
- Organization: Ulster Defence Association
- Notable work: This is It (1982)
- Title: Chairman of the UDA
- Term: 1973–1988
- Predecessor: Charles Harding Smith and Jim Anderson
- Successor: position abolished

Andrew Tyrie (5 February 1940 – 16 May 2025) was a Northern Irish loyalist paramilitary leader who served as commander of the Ulster Defence Association (UDA) during much of its early history. He took the place of Tommy Herron in 1973, when the latter was killed, and led the organisation until March 1988 when an attempt on his life forced him to resign from his command.

== Background ==
Tyrie was born in Belfast, Northern Ireland, one of nine children of an ex-soldier and a part-time seamstress. He was raised in a two-bedroomed house in the Shankill Road. He was educated at the local Brown Street school and found work as a gardener with Belfast City Council. Tyrie's family lived in both Ballymurphy and New Barnsley, but were forced out of both heavily Catholic areas in 1969. The family returned to the Shankill. Tyrie's surname is an ancient Scottish clan name; his ancestors migrated from Scotland to Ireland in the early days of the Ulster Plantation. They first went to Dublin, however, before settling permanently in Ulster.

Tyrie's first involvement with loyalist paramilitaries came in 1967 when he was sworn in as a member of the Ulster Volunteer Force (UVF). However, he did not stay long as he felt that the UVF was doing too little about Protestants being forced out of Catholic areas, such as his own family. He soon fell in behind John McKeague, initially following him in the Ulster Protestant Volunteers, before joining his Shankill Defence Association (SDA) upon its foundation in 1969. Tyrie was a high-profile figure in the SDA when it was absorbed by the Ulster Defence Association (UDA) in 1971.

== Assuming leadership ==
The newly formed UDA was dominated by Charles Harding Smith in the Shankill area and by Tommy Herron in East Belfast. It was feared from early on that a feud between the two would follow if either one was picked to lead the UDA. As such, in March 1973 Tyrie was picked as a compromise candidate for the leadership, being seen by Herron and Harding Smith as someone they could dominate. The strategy did not work, however, as a feud between the two top men followed, with Herron killed in September 1973. Harding Smith remained as a challenge to Tyrie's control.

His new-found role of leader was bolstered by the events of the Ulster Workers' Council Strike of May 1974 in which he played a leading role. Having been a shop steward in his council days, Tyrie became close to strike leader Glenn Barr and the UDA played a central role in marshalling the pickets and ensuring both order amongst the strikers and no picket crossing. Tyrie oversaw this aspect of the strike and was seen as one of the central figures, while the profile of the UDA grew as a result.

With Tyrie's profile boosted by the Ulster Workers Council (UWC) strike, Harding Smith sought to move against Tyrie and used the pretext of Tyrie sending a delegation to Libya, with Muammar al-Gaddafi seen in many loyalist eyes as being firmly on the side of the Provisional Irish Republican Army (IRA). Harding Smith tried to overrule Tyrie but a feud resulted and, after surviving two assassination attempts, Harding Smith was forced to leave Northern Ireland for good.

== Political strategy ==
Tyrie had been a central figure in the strike and as such had close contact with many within the unionist establishment. However once the strike was over he was shunned by Harry West and Ian Paisley and as such he built up a resentment towards mainstream unionism that would inform many of his political decisions as UDA leader. He arranged an alliance with the Vanguard Progressive Unionist Party but when the Ulster Unionist Party and the Democratic Unionist Party declined to join this grand alliance of loyalism Tyrie became even more resolved to pursue a political path for the UDA without mainstream unionism. Tyrie was close to William Craig and had supported his calls to "liquidate the enemy" in 1972, although as Craig's political relevance diminished Tyrie's desire for a politicised UDA increased.

He broke further from the unionist position by calling for some coalitions with moderate nationalists in the Northern Ireland Constitutional Convention, albeit whilst adding that he had prepared the UDA for civil war if the initiative failed and severed all ties following the disastrous re-run of the UWC strike in 1977, during which the attempt not only failed but also saw four people inadvertently killed by the UDA and UVF. Tyrie underlined his split from unionism in 1982 by writing a play, This Is It, in which he savagely attacked Ian Paisley and his "Third Force"'s dabbling in paramilitarism.

Tyrie sought to move the UDA towards more political activity and appointed Sammy Duddy, who had a reputation as a thinker within the movement, as his personal representative. Along with Duddy, Tyrie was one of the authors of the New Ulster Political Research Group document Beyond the Religious Divide which outlined a strategy of co-operation between the two communities within the framework of an independent Northern Ireland. Under his leadership the UDA saw a strong downturn in violent activity in 1977 and 1978, although this followed a two-year period of high activity. Tyrie's political strategy took a blow in 1982 when he was arrested for being in possession of Royal Ulster Constabulary (RUC) maps and charts, although he was acquitted of subsequent terror charges.

== Paramilitary strategy ==
Although under his leadership the UDA undertook a series of sectarian killings, Tyrie would later claim that he had been opposed to this strategy, arguing: "I was sickened every time I heard about the death of a Catholic taxi driver or shop keeper. We wanted to go for the IRA and republicans but we couldn't locate them, we didn't know who they were". As early as 1971 Tyrie had argued that the role of the UDA should be "terrorising the terrorists" i.e. attacking the Republican Movement head on rather than either sectarian attacks against Catholics or the group's stated purpose as a defensive vigilant militia for loyalist areas. These ideas came to fruition to an extent with the Ulster Freedom Fighters (UFF) "shopping list" of leading republicans to be targeted by dedicated death squads in the late 1970s and early 1980s, although this was for the most part directed by UFF leader John McMichael rather than Tyrie.

Tyrie also supported a more professional approach from the UDA and sought to establish more professional training for members, an initiative in which he met stern resistance from other UDA leaders who feared that such a programme would bring about a new elite to threaten their own positions. Tyrie finally got his way in the mid-1980s with a series of residential programmes for young active UDA members. These programmes, overseen by senior UDA members with British Army experience, included both practical training in gun use, bomb-making and close combat as well as more theoretical aspects such as anti-interrogation techniques, basic forensic science training, communications and psychological warfare.

== Removal ==
As part of his political strategy Tyrie became close to South Belfast brigadier John McMichael and supported his development of the Ulster Loyalist Democratic Party along Ulster nationalist lines. He had previously written in a UDA publication in the late 1970s that an independent Northern Ireland could "take its rightful place in the world and not be seen as a country with a death-wish", after becoming disillusioned with what he saw as the British government's lack of commitment to Northern Ireland.

Tyrie shunned the limelight and as a consequence he appointed McMichael as official spokesman for, and thus the public face of, the UDA. However, McMichael's assassination by the IRA in December 1987 and his replacement in the party by the less well-known Ray Smallwoods placed some doubts upon the political strategy that Tyrie had long advocated. Furthermore, resentment among UDA hardliners had been growing and they came to feel that Tyrie's leadership was too much about politics and not enough about military action. Tyrie was also criticised for what his internal opponents felt was a tendency towards cronyism, with the late 1980s seeing responsibility and position being given to internally unpopular figures like Jackie McDonald and Eddie Sayers, seemingly because they were personally close to Tyrie.

To silence some of his critics Tyrie arranged a shipment of guns from Lebanon for the UDA in early 1988. However, after a tip-off, the North Belfast brigadier Davy Payne was stopped at an RUC checkpoint in Portadown. He was driving the "scout" [lead] car as the weapons were being transported in a small convoy of vehicles; the guns which were stored in the boots of his associates' cars were then seized in what was the latest in a series of setbacks that had dogged the UDA as a paramilitary group in the late 1980s. With Tyrie's stock at an all-time low among UDA militants he narrowly avoided death from a car bomb on 6 March 1988. No responsibility for the failed attack was claimed. Tyrie himself felt that the attack was carried out by potential successors within the UDA but, whichever explanation was true, it demonstrated that Tyrie was no longer secure in his position and had become a target within loyalism as UDA leader. Five days after the attack Tyrie announced his resignation as leader of the UDA and was placed on 'retirement' by the organisation.

== Post-UDA activity ==
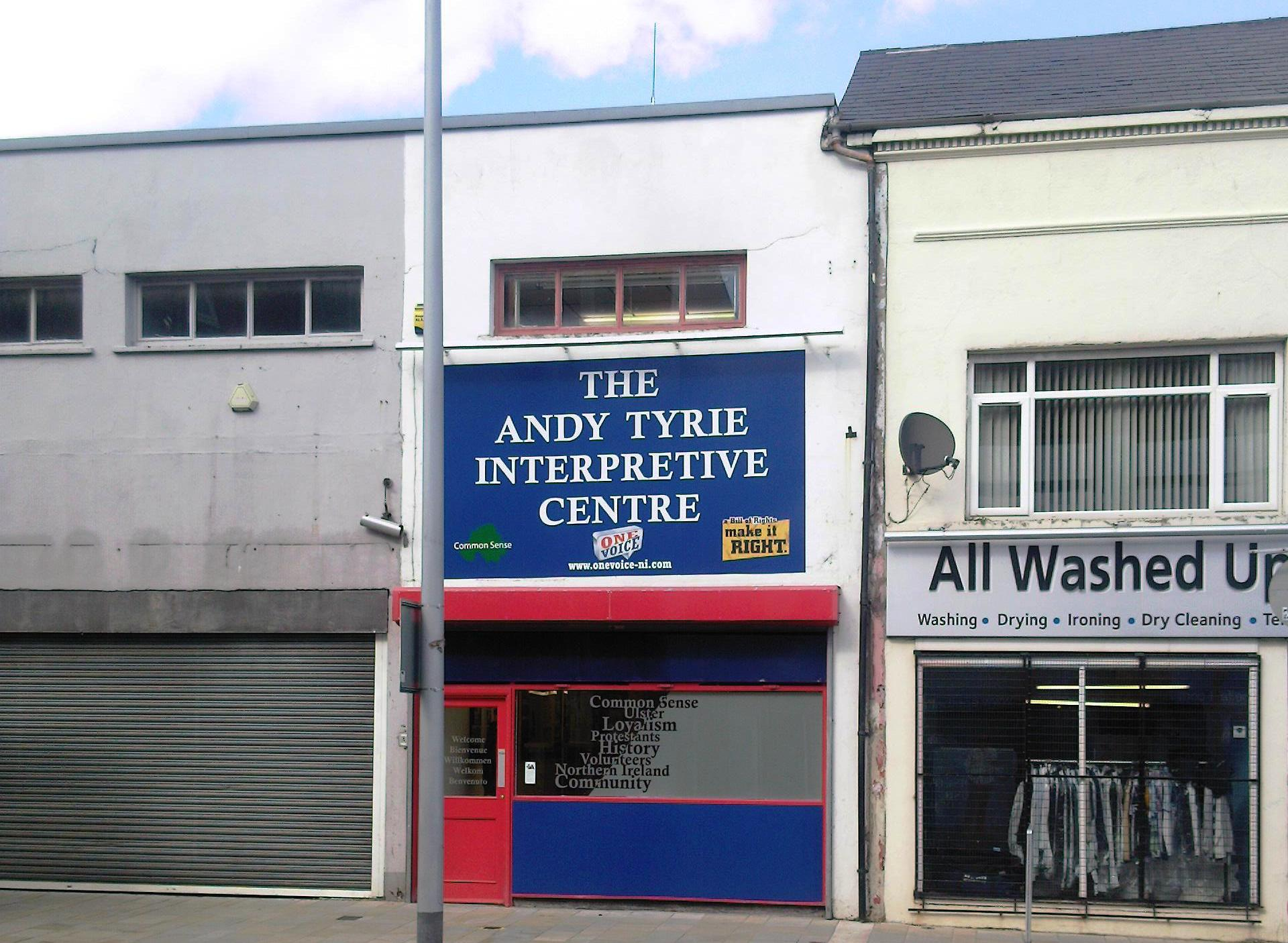
The "Andy Tyrie Interpretive Centre" opened on Belfast's Newtownards Road in 2012 and since closed

Tyrie established his own business in County Down after leaving active duty with the UDA. After quitting as UDA leader Tyrie was largely outside active loyalism, although he was brought back from time to time as the main voice of the old UDA. In 1994 he and Barr were recalled by the Ulster Democratic Party to spearhead their funding initiative. He became an enthusiastic supporter of the UDP in their campaign in favour of the Good Friday Agreement, stating that it vindicated the strategy employed by John McMichael and himself. In this role he became close to John White, who frequently made use of Tyrie when it came to convincing older UDA members of the benefits of the Agreement. At the time of his death, Tyrie was fully retired from politics.

== Death ==
Tyrie died in Belfast on 16 May 2025, aged 85, after a long period of illness. His wife Agnes and family attended his funeral at Dundonald Presbyterian Church on 22 May 2025. The Rev. William McCully called Tyrie a "family man and a Christian."

== Bibliography ==
- McDonald, Henry & Cusack, Jim. UDA – Inside the Heart of Loyalist Terror, Dublin, Penguin Ireland, 2004
- Taylor. Peter. Loyalists, London: Bloomsbury, 2000
- Bowcott, Owen (18 May 2025). "Andy Tyrie obituary". The Guardian.
