= Ulster Workers' Council strike =

May 1974 general strike in Northern Ireland

- Part of The Troubles
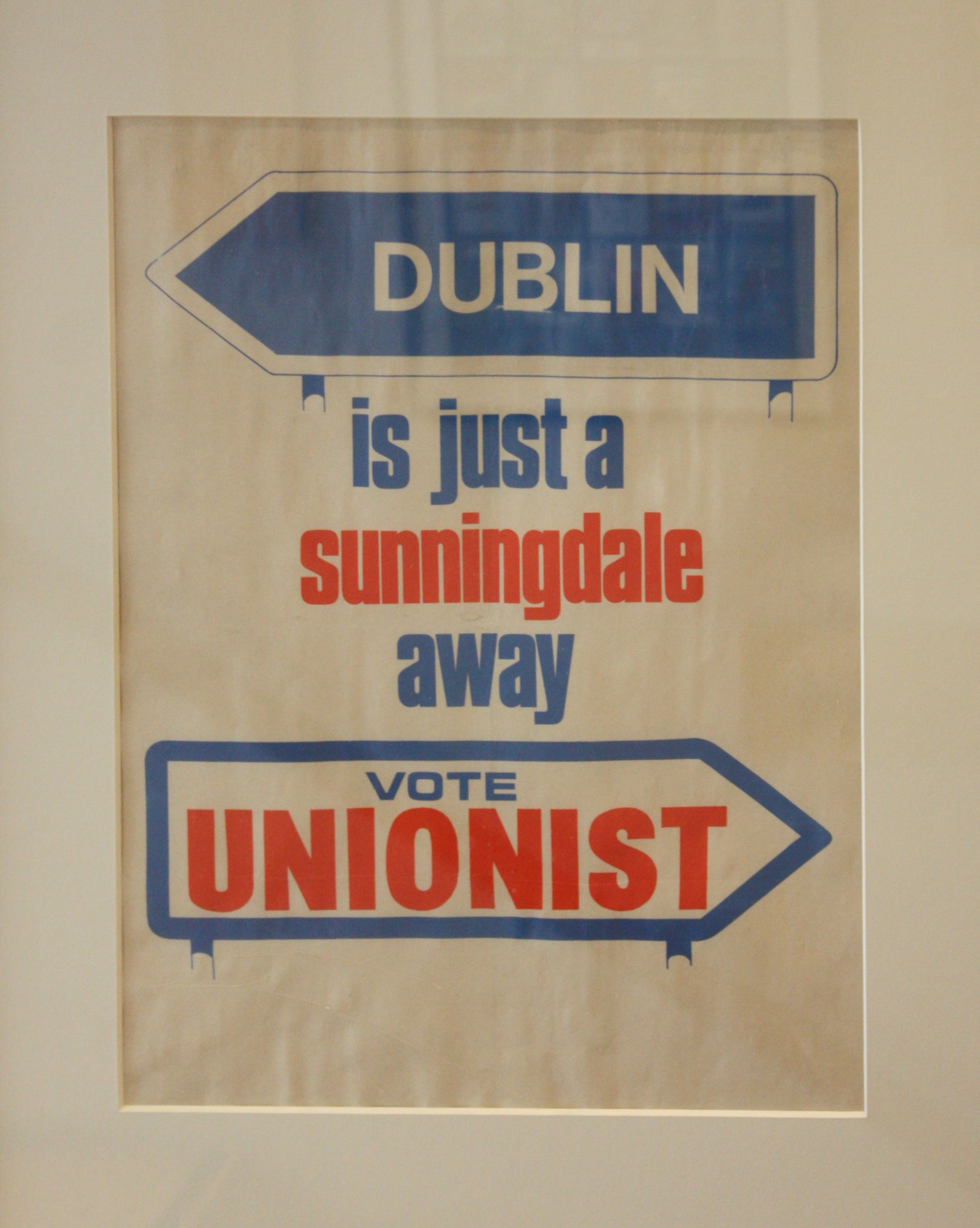
- A 1974 poster by unionists opposed to the Sunningdale Agreement. It implied that the agreement would lead to "Dublin Rule" (that is, a united Ireland), to which unionists were opposed.
- Date: 15–28 May 1974
- Location: Throughout Northern Ireland
- Goals: Abolition of the Sunningdale Agreement and Government of Northern Ireland
- Methods: General strike; Roadblocks; Paramilitary violence
- Result: Government of Northern Ireland prorogued; direct rule re-introduced

Parties
Ulster Workers' Council; Ulster Army Council; United Ulster Unionist Council	Government of Northern Ireland; Government of the United Kingdom

Lead figures
Glenn Barr; Andy Tyrie	Brian Faulkner; Gerry Fitt; Merlyn Rees; Harold Wilson

Casualties and losses
- 39 civilians killed and over 300 injured by loyalist paramilitaries; 2 civilians killed when they crashed into a loyalist roadblock; 1 UVF member killed

The Ulster Workers' Council (UWC) strike was a general strike that took place in Northern Ireland between 15 May and 28 May 1974, during "the Troubles". The strike was called by unionists who were against the Sunningdale Agreement, which had been signed in December 1973. Specifically, the strikers opposed the sharing of political power with Irish nationalists, and the proposed role for the Republic of Ireland's government in running Northern Ireland.

The strike was organised and overseen by the Ulster Workers' Council and Ulster Army Council, which were formed shortly after the Agreement's signing. Both of these groups included Ulster loyalist paramilitaries such as the Ulster Defence Association (UDA) and Ulster Volunteer Force (UVF). These groups helped to enforce the strike by blocking roads and intimidating workers. During the two-week strike, loyalist paramilitaries killed 39 civilians, of whom 33 died in the Dublin and Monaghan bombings.

The strike succeeded in bringing down the power-sharing Northern Ireland Assembly and Executive. Responsibility for the government of Northern Ireland then reverted to the Parliament of the United Kingdom at Westminster under the arrangements for 'Direct Rule'.

The successful strike was later described by the then Secretary of State for Northern Ireland, Merlyn Rees, as an "outbreak of Ulster nationalism".

== Timeline ==
=== 14 May ===
A debate was held in the Northern Ireland Assembly on a motion condemning power-sharing and the Council of Ireland, a group established under the terms of the Sunningdale Agreement to facilitate co-ordination between the governments of Northern Ireland, the Republic of Ireland and the United Kingdom. The motion was defeated by 44 votes to 28. Following the Assembly debate, Harland & Wolff shop steward and Ulster Workers Council (UWC) central organiser Harry Murray told a group of journalists that a general strike would begin the following day in response. The date had been agreed by the UWC some time in advance as they wanted it to coincide with the vote, which they had expected to end in defeat for the hard-line unionist motion.

=== 15 May: Day one of the strike ===
Loyalist paramilitaries manning a roadblock

The strike had a slow start with many workers simply going to work anyway, but after a number of workplace meetings, workers began leaving their workplaces after lunchtime. Murray would later admit that the start of the strike had been poorly organised to the extent that on the first day even his own wife asked him why he was not at work. By the end of day one, the port of Larne was sealed off, with a significant UDA and UVF presence helping to ensure that no ships were allowed to enter or leave the harbour. Elsewhere roadblocks were set up and manned by loyalist paramilitaries under the Ulster Army Council. Hijacked vehicles were often used to block the streets. Electricity supplies were also disrupted when workers at the Ballylumford power station went on strike. The power cuts forced some factories to close and send workers home. The UWC issued a statement that it would ensure that essential services would continue.

During the evening there was a meeting at Stormont Castle between Stanley Orme (then Minister of State at the Northern Ireland Office) and the representatives of the various groups active in UWC, namely Harry West, Bill Craig and Ian Paisley (the leaders of the three political parties – Ulster Unionist Party, Vanguard Unionist Progressive Party and Democratic Unionist Party – that formed the pro-strike United Ulster Unionist Council), Andy Tyrie and Tommy Lyttle of the UDA and the UVF's Ken Gibson. Orme attempted unsuccessfully to persuade the leaders to abandon the strike although it would not be until the 19th that West followed Craig and Paisley in publicly endorsing the strike.

=== 16 May: Day two of the strike ===
The strike began to impact upon agriculture as milk that had not been collected or processed had to be dumped whilst fresh food was similarly not transported to market. However a group of essential services were defined by the UWC, who permitted these to continue as normal, issuing a phone number for anyone involved in these professions. The full list of services deemed essential by the UWC was as follows: bakeries, groceries, dairies, chemists, butchers, confectioners, electricity, gas, water, sewage, hospitals, animal feed, farmers, wages, banks, schools, medical services, hospital and school transport, solicitors, newspapers, normal recreational activities, coal supplies and postal service. Bars were not included in this list, with the UWC ordering pub closures. This decision, which was made in the evening of 16 May, several hours after the initial list had been published, was strongly influenced by the wives of striking workers, who had complained that many of their husbands were using the strike as an excuse for heavy drinking sessions.

Attempts by significant sections of the workforce to carry on at leading Belfast factories such as Mackies on the Springfield Road and Gallahers on York Road were thwarted when loyalist paramilitaries turned up at the premises ordering everybody out and throwing petrol bombs. Workers were largely untouched in predominantly Catholic towns such as Strabane as the loyalist paramilitaries had no structure in place to launch an intimidation campaign but even in these locations work was severely disrupted as electricity supplies proved highly unreliable.

A political response to the strike began to develop slowly. In the British House of Commons at Westminster the UWC strike featured as the main subject of Northern Ireland 'question time'. Merlyn Rees met with loyalists leaders at the Northern Ireland Parliament but insisted that he would not negotiate with the UWC. Meanwhile, Executive member Paddy Devlin threatened to resign over the continuing use of internment.

A Catholic civilian, Maureen Moore (21), was shot dead by a loyalist sniper as she stood at the corner of Stratheden Street and Edlingham Street in Belfast. A witness said the gunman, believed to be from the UDA, emerged from the Protestant Tiger's Bay area. One woman said there had been sporadic trouble in the area that day and complained that the British Army had done little to stop UDA activity. The army was also engaged in the New Lodge are of north Belfast, breaking up riots between Catholic residents and their Protestant neighbours in Tiger's Bay.

=== 17 May: Day three of the strike ===
Dublin and Monaghan bombings – the UVF exploded four car bombs in the Republic of Ireland. The attacks killed 33 civilians and wounded almost 300 – the highest number of casualties in any single day during "the Troubles". No warnings were given before the bombs were detonated. Three exploded in Dublin during rush hour (killing 26 people and an unborn child) and one exploded in Monaghan 90 minutes later (killing 7 people). Most of the victims were young women, although the ages of the dead ranged from five months to 80 years. There are allegations that British Intelligence colluded in the bombings. Sammy Smyth, then press officer of both the UDA and the UWC Strike Committee, said "I am very happy about the bombings in Dublin. There is a war with the [Republic of Ireland] and now we are laughing at them".

In the strike itself postal delivery services were halted following intimidation of Royal Mail workers. However the Executive put in place arrangements to ensure that Social Security benefits were paid to claimants.

=== 18 May: Day four of the strike ===
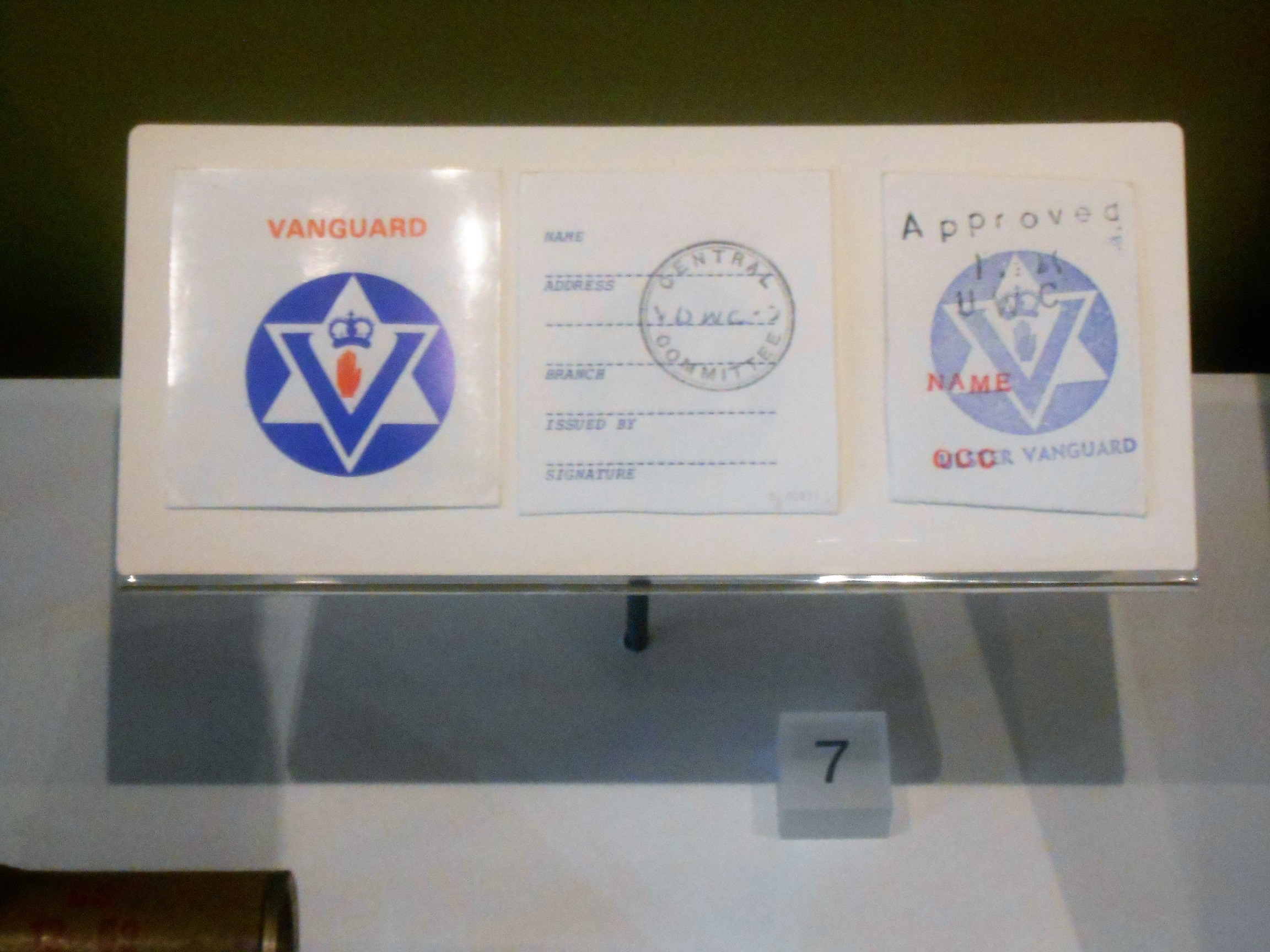
Pass card issued by the UWC to members for use during the strike.

A statement was issued by the UWC indicating that they favoured escalating the strike, calling for an all-out stoppage to commence at midnight on Sunday 19 May. There was still some scepticism about the chances of success for the strike at this point as it had yet to win much support amongst the Protestant middle classes and skilled workers. Indeed, even Rev. Robert Bradford, a member of the Vanguard, had argued that morning that the strike should be ended as he believed the politicians could bring down the Executive on their own. Nonetheless, a note of caution was sounded when the Executive was informed that the British Army would not be able to run the power stations alone and attempts were made to open negotiations between the UWC and the Northern Ireland Labour Party.

A member of the UDA shot dead UVF member Joseph Shaw during a fight in North Star Bar on North Queen Street, Belfast.

=== 19 May: Day five of the strike ===
Merlyn Rees declared a State of Emergency under Section Forty of the Northern Ireland Constitution Act 1973. Rees then flew to Chequers for talks with British Prime Minister Harold Wilson. Meanwhile, the United Ulster Unionist Council met and decided to publicly declare their support for the UWC, which in turn withdrew its earlier call for an all-out stoppage.

=== 20 May: Day six of the strike ===
With the public support of the UUUC now secured the UWC set up a co-ordinating committee to run the strike on more professional lines. Chaired by Glenn Barr, a leading figure in both the Vanguard and the UDA, the group consisted of around fifteen members including the three political party leaders, three UWC members and the heads of the loyalist paramilitaries. The first meeting of the committee revealed some friction as Barr entered late and found Ian Paisley sitting at the head of the table. Barr told him "you might be chairman of the Democratic Unionist Party but I'm chairman of the co-ordinating committee, so move over". Paisley moved from the head of the table but carried the chair away with him and the two argued over the chair itself, with Paisley eventually allowed to retain it as he claimed to need a chair with arms due to his back pain.

As a result of the strikes electricity generation had fallen to around one third of standard levels and telephone calls were to be restricted to emergency use only. Meanwhile, the British government deployed an extra five hundred troops to Northern Ireland. The United Ulster Unionist Council leaders meanwhile took out an advertisement in the Belfast News Letter declaring their support for the UWC.

Catholic civilian Michael Mallon (20) was found shot dead by the side of Milltown Road in Belfast. He had been beaten-up in a UDA club before being shot four times in the head and dumped by the roadside. In the Falls district, a 28-year-old Catholic man was shot four times on a street corner. The gunman sped-off in a car and the victim was reported to be in a critical condition.

=== 21 May: Day seven of the strike ===
Len Murray, the then General Secretary of the Trades Union Congress (TUC), led a 'back-to-work' march but it drew only 200 people. The march was flanked by the Royal Ulster Constabulary (RUC) and British Army but a crowd of loyalists still managed to attack some of the marchers. A simultaneous march in Cregagh attracted only seventeen people.

In a speech at Westminster, British Prime Minister Harold Wilson condemned the strike. He said that it was a "sectarian strike" and was "being done for sectarian purposes".

A 13-year-old Catholic girl lost both legs when she stepped on an Irish Republican Army land mine in the Andersonstown area of Belfast. In Bangor a bomb wrecked the house of a Catholic family who were away on holiday. Another bomb wrecked seven shops in Castlederg.

=== 22 May: Day eight of the strike ===
In an attempt to bring the strike to an end the Executive agreed to postpone certain parts of the Sunningdale Agreement until 1977 and to reduce the size of the Council of Ireland. The UWC leaders rejected these proposals although the British Government reiterated their earlier position that they would not enter into negotiations with the UWC.

A bomb damaged a section of the Belfast–Bangor railway line. It was believed to be the work of loyalists intent on halting all public transport. Another bomb exploded in a shop in the Shankill area of Belfast after the owner defied UWC orders to stay open no more than four hours; there were no injuries. Meanwhile, on Belfast's Newtownards Road, two civilians (one of them on a motorbike) were wounded by gunfire from an unknown source.

=== 23 May: Day nine of the strike ===
A number of barricades erected by loyalists were removed by the security forces but were quickly re-erected. The strike also hit schools with some GCE exams being affected (although for the most part schools remained open for the duration of the strike).

Politically, Gerry Fitt called for the British Army to be deployed to the power stations and the oil refineries whilst Northern Ireland Question Time again focused on the strike. Wilson, on the advice of defence secretary Roy Mason, refused to deploy the Army.

=== 24 May: Day ten of the strike ===
Harold Wilson, Brian Faulkner (the Chief Executive), Gerry Fitt (the Deputy Chief Executive) and Oliver Napier (the Legal Minister and Head of the Office of Law Reform) met at Chequers to discuss the strike. Following the meeting a statement was issued affirming the earlier British government position that any group operating outside constitutional politics could not be negotiated with.

Loyalists shot dead two Catholic civilians, Sean Byrne and his brother Brendan Byrne, at their pub The Wayside Halt near Ballymena, County Antrim. The UDA and UVF members, travelling in minibuses, had wrecked three other pubs around Ballymena and attacked the owners for staying open during the strike. Twenty people were arrested over the killings. Meanwhile, a petrol station in Belfast was bombed for staying open during the strike; there were no injuries. Elsewhere a teenage boy and girl were killed when their car crashed into a loyalist roadblock near Dungannon. The roadblock had been made from a tree felled across the road.

=== 25 May: Day eleven of the strike ===
Harold Wilson made a broadcast on television. He condemned the strike as "a deliberate and calculated attempt to use every undemocratic and unparliamentary means for the purpose of bringing down the whole constitution of Northern Ireland so as to set up there a sectarian and undemocratic state". Wilson controversially referred to the strikers and the strike's leaders as "spongers". The speech was interpreted by many Northern Irish Protestants as an attack on them as a whole rather than the UWC and galvanised support for the strike, with a small sponge worn on the lapel appearing as a sign of support for the UWC the following morning.

A Catholic civilian, Alfred Stilges (52), was found beaten to death in an empty house on Forthriver Road in the Glencairn area Belfast. The attack was blamed on loyalists.

=== 26 May: Day twelve of the strike ===
The British Army launched a series of raids on loyalists areas around Belfast, taking more than thirty suspected activists into custody.

The UWC declared its system of permits a success and argued that it was ensuring maintenance of the previously defined 'essential services', especially the supply of petrol.

Police reported that–over the past few days–two petrol stations had been bombed, three pubs and a café had been wrecked and three more pubs had been burnt-down after their owners refused to shut.

=== 27 May: Day thirteen of the strike ===
The army took over twenty petrol stations across the region to supply petrol to those drivers deemed essential and in receipt of a Ministry of Commerce permit. In response to this development the UWC announced that it would no longer oversee the 'essential services' and declared that the army could now look after even the most basic of provisions. They further announced that at midnight Ballylumford power station would be closed down with its workers joining the strike. The energy crisis deepened when a pressure drop in the system hit gas supplies in Belfast and surrounding areas, resulting in a warning that gas users would have to switch their supplies off at the mains.

A car bomb exploded in the underground car-park of the Russell Court Hotel in Belfast, forcing it to shut.

=== 28 May: Day fourteen of the strike ===
Rees' continuing refusal to meet with the UWC representatives saw Brian Faulkner tender his resignation as chief executive. When Faulkner's Pro-Assembly Unionist supporters followed him in resigning the Northern Ireland Executive was for all intents and purposes brought to a conclusion. In his final speech in the Executive meeting room Faulkner said "after five months of being able to work together, Catholic and Protestant, I hope that one thing can remain – that we do not attack each other on a sectarian basis ever again".

In a final show of support for the strike the Upper Newtownards Road in East Belfast was lined by farmers in their tractors with the convoy continuing all the way to the front entrance of the Stormont parliament, blocking the entrance. Before long news about the collapse of the Executive spread across Northern Ireland, sparking uproarious scenes in Protestant areas.

== Aftermath ==
Many people returned to work on 29 May, with the UWC announcing a formal end to the strike on that day. The Assembly itself was officially prorogued the following day, although it was not officially abolished until 29 March 1975. In the immediate aftermath of the strike the dichotomy between the political and worker leaders was thrown into sharp contrast. Ian Paisley addressed a rally in Rathcoole at which he claimed a personal victory before a crowd of 5,000 people whilst Harry Murray returned to the anonymity of his work at the shipyard. Very soon the three political leaders also ended their relationship with Andy Tyrie, despite his leading role in the strike.

Merlyn Rees had interpreted the strike, in which avowed loyalists had openly defied the British government, as an outbreak of Ulster nationalism. Journalist Robert Fisk endorsed this view by arguing that:

The fifteen unprecedented, historic days in which a million British citizens, the Protestants of Northern Ireland, staged what amounted to a rebellion against the Crown and won... During those fifteen days, for the first time in over fifty years... a section of the realm became totally ungovernable. A self-elected provisional government of Protestant power workers, well-armed private armies and extreme politicians organized a strike which almost broke up the fabric of civilized life in Ulster. They deprived most of the population for much of the time of food, water, electricity, gas, transport, money and any form of livelihood.

T. E. Utley also recognised the fact that the UWC's apparatus had become almost a shadow government for the duration of the strike although he did not develop this point, instead concentrating on praising the strike and its aims thus:

Here was an instance of a working-class movement which had resolved to achieve a political objective by means of a general strike. ... By the beginning of the second week of the strike, support for it had spread throughout all classes of the Protestant community. Bank managers and suburban golf club secretaries cheered the strikers on. The atmosphere recalled that of Britain in 1940. ... The whole operation was conducted...with the utmost discipline and efficiency. The strikers virtually took over the task of government. They enforced a petrol rationing scheme and issued passes to those permitted to go to work. They collected and distributed food, carrying with them the farmers who willingly bore severe financial losses in the process. Their public service announcements were read out on the BBC's Ulster Service each morning. Inevitably, there were instances of brutality, theft and peculation, but the prevailing spirit was one of dignified patriotic protest.

For a time the UDA looked to this spirit of Ulster nationalism for its own policy, with Glenn Barr, Andy Tyrie, Tommy Lyttle and Harry Chicken spearheading an initiative in this direction which culminated in the production of the 1979 New Ulster Political Research Group document Beyond the Religious Divide, which drew up a blueprint for a negotiated independence for Northern Ireland, as well as a framework constitution for the new state. The idea however failed to take off as the UDA was unable to challenge the hegemony of the political parties and it was only in the Vanguard Progressive Unionist Party that there existed any sympathy for the notion of independence. The UVF formed a Volunteer Political Party soon after the strike and this group, which rejected Ulster nationalism, suffered similar problems to the politicising UDA as it too failed to make any inroads into the support of the established unionist parties.

For Harold Wilson the success of the UWC strike convinced him that it was no longer worthwhile to attempt to impose a settlement on Northern Ireland from Westminster. As a result, the next attempt at devolution undertaken by Wilson's government was the Northern Ireland Constitutional Convention of 1975. Based on the principle of "rolling devolution" it elected a body of politicians and left it up to them to decide the future structure of devolved institutions. The body was dominated by UUUC and collapsed without reaching any conclusions, although it did precipitate a split in the Vanguard after Craig suggested power-sharing with the Social Democratic and Labour Party and the majority of his party broke away in protest to form the United Ulster Unionist Party.

The UWC would organise a second strike in 1977 although this time without the support of the Ulster Unionists, the Vanguard, the UVF or Glenn Barr. With confused aims and a lack of widespread support this strike collapsed and brought about a permanent rift in the relationship between the Democratic Unionist Party and the UDA.

== See also ==
- Ulster Says No
- Timeline of Ulster Defence Association actions
- Timeline of Ulster Volunteer Force actions

== Bibliography ==
- Anderson, Don, 14 May Days, Dublin: Gill and Macmillan, 1994, ISBN 0-7171-2177-1
- Fisk, Robert S, Point of No Return: the Strike which Broke the British in Ulster, HarperCollins, 1975, ISBN 023396682X
- McDonald, Henry and Cusack, Jim, UDA: Inside the Heart of Loyalist Terror, Mainstream Publishing, Edinburgh, 2004.
- McKittrick, David, D, Kelters, S, Feeney, B and Thornton, C. Lost Lives. Mainstream Publishing, Edinburgh, 1999.
