= Ulster Constitution Defence Committee =

Northern Irish loyalist group

The Ulster Constitution Defence Committee (UCDC) was a body established in Northern Ireland by the Rev. Ian Paisley in April 1966 as the governing organ of the loyalist Ulster Protestant Volunteers (UPV). It coordinated parades, counter-demonstrations and paramilitary activities against the reforms of prime minister Terence O'Neill and any gestures made to the civil rights movement.

== Background ==
The fourth Prime Minister of Northern Ireland, Terence O'Neill, who began his term in 1963, was trying to modernize industry to stave off an economic depression. This process brought foreign industry to Northern Ireland and threatened the Protestant, Unionist, powerbase: the Unionists held 90% of jobs but foreign industries were hiring Catholics, thus reducing Protestant strength. In 1965, Terence O'Neill also invited and met with Sean Lemass, the Prime Minister of the Republic of Ireland, to promote economic cooperation. Unionists often regarded Ireland as the enemy and a report from Brian McConnell, the Home Affairs Minister, said a new IRA campaign of subversion was imminent.

Ian Paisley, a fundamentalist Presbyterian and political activist, was a staunch supporter of the Unionist status quo. Fundamentalists were closely associated with 'traditional Unionism,' which sought to preserve Protestant advantages in employment, housing, and political influence. Paisley and his supporters argued that the rising ecumenical and liberal movements within Protestantism aligned with the political elite and Catholicism, thereby threatening the interests of the Protestant working class. While Paisley initially planned to field four candidates for the 1964 Westminster general election, he ultimately withdrew them, citing the lack of a sophisticated electoral party infrastructure required to challenge the Ulster Unionist Party at the polls. (Boulton 34)

Noel Doherty, a member of Paisley's Free Presbyterian Church and a printer, helped Paisley form the Puritan Printing Company and create the first edition of the Protestant Telegraph in May 1966. Doherty was an admirer of Gusty Spence, a member of Ulster Protestant Action and a much tougher character who re-created the Ulster Volunteer Force (UVF) in March 1966, just prior to the formation of the UCDC. While proposing the political vehicle Paisley needed, Doherty's motives aligned more with Spence than with Paisley. Doherty used his position of trust with Paisley and began to organize a network of the 'Ulster Protestant Volunteer Corps' about two months before the creation of the UCDC.

== Organization ==
Ian Paisley met with fellow loyalists including Noel Doherty in April 1966, when he discussed a proposal by Doherty to create the Ulster Constitution Defence Committee. Paisley was made the chairman and a "12-man united society of Protestant patriots pledged by all lawful methods to uphold and maintain the constitution of Northern Ireland" (also known as "the 12 disciples") was created. Doherty was made the Secretary.(Boulton 34–36)

=== UCDC Debut ===
The public debut of the UCDC took place on the Shankill Road (West Belfast) on 17 April 1966, in the form of a parade led by Ian Paisley and Noel Doherty. Members of both Doherty's and Spence's newly created bodies participated in the parade and were publicly thanked by Paisley.

=== Organising the UPV ===
In May 1966, the UCDC decided to split Doherty's Ulster Protestant Volunteers (UPV), which was a loyalist paramilitary group, into local branches, which were called divisions. The UPV was under the governance of the UCDC, binding it by a constitution which condemned illegal violence.(Boulton 38). Only Protestants were allowed to join and Roman Catholics along with members of the RUC were automatically excluded.

== Activities ==
Noel Doherty made it difficult to separate the activities of the UCDC/UPV from the activities of the UVF. He asked members of the UVF and the Armagh Free Presbyterian Church to attend a meeting where the Loughgall division of the UPV would be created. During the meeting both guns and gelignite were discussed, along with reprisals against the IRA. Doherty chaired the meeting but Ian Paisley was not there, and later denied any knowledge, which was supported by Doherty.

Despite the UCDC's disassociation with violence and illegal activities, divisions of the UPV under control of the UCDC were linked with petrol bomb attacks on Catholic schools, shops, bars and homes in the Spring of 1966.(Coogan 49,50) The Royal Ulster Constabulary (RUC) investigated. Five of these attacks were in April and the 1st week of May.

Noel Doherty facilitated the Loughgall division of the UPV and Gusty Spence's Shankill Ulster Volunteer Force (UVF) working together.(Boulton 41) Doherty introduced a quarryman who supplied the explosive, gelignite and detonators to members of the UVF. (Boulton 42)

== Dissociation from the UVF ==
Paisley organised a picket against a liberal church parade on 6 April 1966. He felt that the church supported Terrence O'Neill's political viewpoint which Paisley opposed. The parade went through a Catholic area and a riot broke out (the Presbyterian General Assembly riot). Four policemen were badly injured which began an open hostility between the RUC and Paisley. The Orange Order, the liberal Presbyterian Church and official unionism disassociated themselves from Paisley and said his organisations "represent a defiance of lawful authority no less serious in essence than that of the IRA."

A murder outside a bar known as the Malvern Arms was investigated and the UCDC, led by Ian Paisley was implicated but he denied any knowledge. UVF men Gusty Spence, Hugh McClean and Robert Williamson shot four Catholic barmen. Off-duty RUC men were in the back room of the bar and arrests were made. The three gunmen were convicted and sentenced to life imprisonment.

Terrence O'Neill banned the UVF under the Civil Authorities (Special Powers) Act of 1932. The UCDC and the UPV were not banned but O'Neill made many attempts to tie the organisations together, implying that Paisley was the leader. Paisley denied any connection with the UVF. He and James McConnell, the vice-chairman of the UCDC, expelled Doherty from the UCDC.(Boulton 54) Four days after the murder conviction, Noel Doherty was sentenced to two years on an explosive charge. The quarryman who supplied the explosives, Jim Marshal, was fined £200.

Paisley was sent to jail on 19 July 1966 for refusing to sign a pledge of good behaviour after the Presbyterian General Assembly Riot. As a result, protests, parades and riots ensued. On Paisley's release on 19 October, his supporters celebrated all over Protestant Belfast.

Early clashes between Catholics and Protestants were reported on 7 March 1967.

The Government of Northern Ireland moved today to prevent new clashes between Irish Republicans and extreme Protestants led by the Rev. Ian Paisley.

== Counter demonstrations ==
The Northern Ireland civil rights movement was founded in February 1967. It was made up from three distinct social groups: the Catholic middle class; the students of Queen's University; and the working class in the Catholic ghettos. It also included the remnants of the old IRA. The Northern Ireland Civil Rights Association (NICRA), chaired by Mrs. Betty Sinclair, was slow starting. When it did start marching, the result was bloody clashes with the various Protestant organisations. (Boulton 66–67)

The first civil rights march was scheduled for August 24, 1968. It was supposed to proceed from Coalisland to Dungannon by going through Market Square and the town centre. The UCDC/UPC convinced the police to re-route the march through the Catholic part of town. The marchers were met at the outskirts of Dungannon by the police and a large group made up mainly by the Ulster Protestant Volunteers. The police managed to keep both groups apart but were abused by both sides. At the conclusion of the demonstration, the executives of the UCDC thanked the UPV members for their support and stated that, "The policy of the UCDC, through the UPC, has been and will continue to be to confront the enemy at every opportunity." (Boulton 69)

The next civil rights march was banned as it was supposed to parade through part of Derry within the city walls. This was considered 'sacred' ground by the Protestants and not only the UPV but by all the unionists and the police. The marchers ignored the order and were confronted by the RUC riot squad where 90 marchers and 18 police were injured. "Meanwhile, students at Queens University here announced they would hold a rally of about 1,500 people to protest reported police brutality. A rival meeting was planned by the Ulster (Northern Ireland) Constitution Defense Committee."

Another NICRA demonstration in Belfast on 9 October 1968 was blocked by a crowd led by Ian Paisley. Derry was the site of numerous other civil rights marches and counter marches by the UCDC/UPV. The battles were having a political impact and Terrence O'Neill was a central figure in supporting the reforms to try to control the situation between the civil rights groups and the UCDC/UPV along with other Protestant groups.

== Reforms ==
The UCDC was used to lead the campaign against the reforms of the Prime Minister of Northern Ireland, Terence O'Neill, in the late 1960s.(Coogan 51)

The reforms requested were as follows:

- Reform the voting wards within Derry.
- One-man, one-vote
- A reformed system of housing allocations
- Abolition of the Special Powers Act
- Appointment of an Ombudsman

O'Neill proposed reforms that resembled those requested but the proposal toned down the requests leaving neither side satisfied. The UPV issued a statement that inflamed the situation.

In face of these present awful and terrible events, when one by one the lights of fredom [sic] are going out, we the members of the UPV, beseech you, our loyal brethren, for the sake of God, out country and our children, to forget all petty quarrels and jealousies and defend our constitution and liberty ... He that would be free must strike the first blow.

== Bombings ==
A series of bomb attacks against local power and water distribution were attributed to the UCDC/UPC and the outlawed UVF. The attacks were considered to cause civil disruption with the result to force Terrence O'Neill to resign. Court trials found most of the defendants not-guilty so the attacks could not be linked to one or more Protestant extremist groups.

O'Neill resigned in April 1969 after he was nearly defeated in his area by Ian Paisley.
