= Ulster Protestant Volunteers =

Northern Irish paramilitary group

The Ulster Protestant Volunteers (UPV) were a loyalist paramilitary group in Northern Ireland. They were active between 1966 and 1969 and closely linked to the Ulster Constitution Defence Committee (UCDC) and Ulster Volunteer Force (UVF). The UPV were led by Noel Doherty under the overall control of the Rev. Ian Paisley.

The organisation's inaugural meeting took place in Belfast's Ulster Hall. In the spring of 1966, members bombed an all-girls primary school in Ardoyne, where talks to better relations between Protestants and Catholics were to take place. In May of that year the group murdered a 70-year-old, Matilda Gould, a Protestant whom UPV men mistook for a Catholic living next door. Shortly after this, the UVF and UPV took part in the killings of two Catholic men not far from the scene of the first attack. Following the 1967 trial of the UVF's leader Gusty Spence, the two groups were classified as illegal organisations. Paisley split from the UPV at this time.

== 1969 bombing campaign ==
In the spring of 1969, the UPV took part in a bombing campaign across Belfast. The series of bombings took place on 30 March, 4 April, 20 April, 24 and 26 April. These attacks targeted electricity substations that would remove power from the east and south parts of Belfast. Other attacks targeted the water supply. A separate bombing was also planned to target a hydroelectric plant in Ballyshannon. As a result, Irish troops moved toward the border alongside ambulances, and British troops moved into the area as well. The UPV was also involved in the RTÉ Studio bombing on 5 August 1969.

Shortly after the failed attack in Ballyshannon, a message was issued by the groups:

"We wish to state that an active service unit from Northern Ireland was dispatched to undertake this task. So long as the threats from Éire continue, so long will the Volunteers of Ulster’s People’s Army strike at targets in Southern Ireland."

Several attacks followed, including ones in Bodenstown and Dublin.

== After 1969 ==
In April 1970, the UPV called off a march through Derry city centre celebrating the victories of Ian Paisley and William Beattie in the Northern Ireland Parliament by-election. That same month Sir Arthur Young, Inspector General of the Royal Ulster Constabulary (RUC), cancelled a meeting with the 2nd Lagan Valley division of the UPV for picketing police headquarters in advance of the meeting.

In July 1971 the South Londonderry Division of the UPV warned that the "Loyalist people of Northern Ireland would soon be left with no alternative but to take the law into their own hands." In October 1971 the UPV called on Unionist MPs to vote against entering the European Economic Community, claiming that membership would curtail the UK's sovereignty and threaten Northern Ireland's place in the UK.

In May 1972 the Larne branch of the UPV organised a rally to protest against the existence of "no-go areas" in predominantly Nationalist areas of Northern Ireland. Rev. William McCrea and a local councillor were the guest speakers.

In January 1973 Ian Paisley and William Craig accompanied by a delegation of representatives from Larne-based loyalist organisations including the UPV, Loyalist Association of Workers (UPV), Ulster Defence Association (UDA), Tartan gangs and "East Antrim Loyalist Front" met a high-ranking RUC officer. The meeting came after several local members of loyalist paramilitary groups had been questioned by police. Some had their fingerprints taken and told that charges may be brought against them. A RUC spokesman stated afterwards he was impressed by the "reasonable approach" by the loyalist delegation and some points had been cleared up by both sides.

In November 1983, in the aftermath of the Darkley killings, the UPV claimed to have mobilised for undercover duty in border areas and other "danger zones" in Northern Ireland where Republican paramilitaries were active. The UPV spokesman stated "We will not be seen on the ground. Our work will be undercover and in monitoring the security situation." The UPV wanted to assemble an "Ulster Security Council" with "full powers to repel the rebellion" and also demanded the resignations of the RUC Chief Constable, and the Secretary of State for Northern Ireland.

Former members of the UPV later joined Ulster Resistance, another paramilitary grouping linked to Ian Paisley.

== See also ==
- Ulster
- Ulster Protestant Action
- Ulster Protestant League (1931)
- Third Force (Northern Ireland)
- Ulster Resistance
