= Senator McCullough =

Senator McCullough may refer to:

- Charles McCullough (Northern Ireland politician) (1923–2014), Northern Irish Senate
- Frank S. McCullough (1905–1998), New York State Senate
- Henry M. McCullough (1858–1930), Maryland State Senate
- Hiram McCullough (1813–1885), Maryland State Senate
- James J. McCullough (born 1942), New Jersey State Senate
- John G. McCullough (1835–1915), California State Senate and Vermont State Senate

== See also ==
- Senator McCulloch (disambiguation)
