= Noel Doherty (loyalist) =

Northern Irish loyalist activist (1940–2008)

Noel Doherty (26 December 1940 – 26 December 2008) was a Northern Irish loyalist activist who was close to Ian Paisley during Paisley's early years in politics. He served as leader of the Ulster Protestant Volunteers and was imprisoned for his involvement in procuring explosives for that organisation.

== Early years ==
In school, Doherty had been noted for his Calvinist fundamentalism and had frequent fierce rows with his classmates about the nature of such issues as creation and Virgin birth, with Doherty refusing to brook any deviation from a literal interpretation of the Bible. Attracted to fundamentalism, Doherty joined the Ravenhill Road congregation of the Free Presbyterian Church of Ulster in 1956 and soon became close to its leader, the Reverend Ian Paisley. He also joined the Ulster Special Constabulary ("B Specials") around the same time as he considered them a bulwark of Protestantism in Northern Ireland.

== Paisley's ally ==
Although Doherty was only 16 years of age when Ulster Protestant Action was set up in 1956, Paisley nominated the east Belfast native to a post on the executive body of the newly formed movement. Doherty also headed up another of Paisley's initiatives, the Orange Defence Committee, a group secretly established by Paisley in 1963 but publicly led by Doherty, to co-ordinate opposition to Terence O'Neill within the Orange Order. Paisley had split from the Order three years earlier, but Doherty remained a member and so was chosen as leader of the new initiative. A printer by trade, Doherty oversaw the establishment of Paisley's own printing concern. In 1965 he bought a second-hand printing press and set up the Puritan Printing Press, which produced Paisley's literature, including his newspaper the Protestant Telegraph.

== Ulster Protestant Volunteers ==
In 1966 he came up with the idea of establishing the Ulster Constitution Defence Committee (UCDC) as a governing body of twelve leading Ulster loyalists, which was to be connected to the Ulster Protestant Volunteers (UPV), a much bigger body of men which claimed to be committed to legality. Doherty was appointed as leader of the UPV after it was set up. Under Paisley's instructions he was to set up "divisions" of the UPV, based on the divisions of parliamentary constituencies, all over Northern Ireland, although Doherty soon came to refer to these as "cells" and gave the embryonic movement a highly militarised structure. Doherty also sought to buy up stashes of guns for the UPV, feeling that they would be needed in a future Paisley-led uprising. He later claimed that Paisley, whom he referred to as "our Moses", had no idea of these plans and argued that he would not have trusted Paisley with the knowledge that the UPV was building up an arsenal.

Doherty was soon introduced to James Marshall, who said that he could supply Doherty and the UPV with explosives and a meeting was arranged at which Doherty was accompanied by Billy Mitchell. The explosives would be used in 1969 as part of a series of bombings in which members of the UPV caused small explosions at a Castlereagh electricity station, Silent Valley Reservoir and a further electricity station in County Donegal. Mitchell, who was a member of the Ulster Volunteer Force (UVF), dismissed the attacks as minor, claiming that all Doherty had was "a few sticks of weeping gelly an auld farmer would use to blow up tree stumps" but nonetheless the bombings caused an outcry. Doherty had also joined the UVF and introduced other UVF members to Marshall to supply that group with the same bomb-making technology. He procured explosives for the Shankill Road UVF but during the transaction a business card belonging to his associate James Murdock was dropped at the scene and found by the Royal Ulster Constabulary. Doherty was soon connected to the incident and arrested for his involvement. He was sentenced to two years' imprisonment on 18 October 1966. The UVF publicly denied that Doherty was a member of their organisation.

Doherty was imprisoned in Crumlin Road Gaol. On the day of his imprisonment, Paisley made a speech outside the prison in which he denied all knowledge of Doherty's offences, before announcing that he was forthwith expelled from the UPV and the UCDC. Doherty's position as UCDC secretary was taken over by Hercules Mallon, whose brother Frank was already treasurer of the movement. Both would later be tried for their roles in the 1969 bombing campaign.

== Later years and legacy ==
Following his release from prison, Doherty disappeared from view and was rumoured to have emigrated to Southern Rhodesia and then South Africa under apartheid to fight "terrorists". He eventually established his own printing press in South Africa. He was eventually found to be living in England in the 1990s by Peter Taylor, who interviewed him whilst researching his Loyalists documentary and book. Doherty returned to private life after the interview and his whereabouts again became unknown.

He was notorious as a conspiracy theorist and preached that a massive conspiracy existed between the Catholic Church, the major denominations of Protestantism, the ecumenical movement, the governments of the Republic of Ireland and the United Kingdom, communists, and even elements within the Ulster Unionist Party, to force a united Ireland and "Rome rule" on Ulster Protestants. His conspiracy theories were taken up by the likes of William McGrath, the founder of Tara, and John McKeague, who established a number of groups including the Shankill Defence Association, the Red Hand Commando and the Ulster Independence Party.
