= Ian Paisley =

Northern Irish politician and religious leader (1926–2014)

The Reverend and Right Honourable The Lord Bannside PC
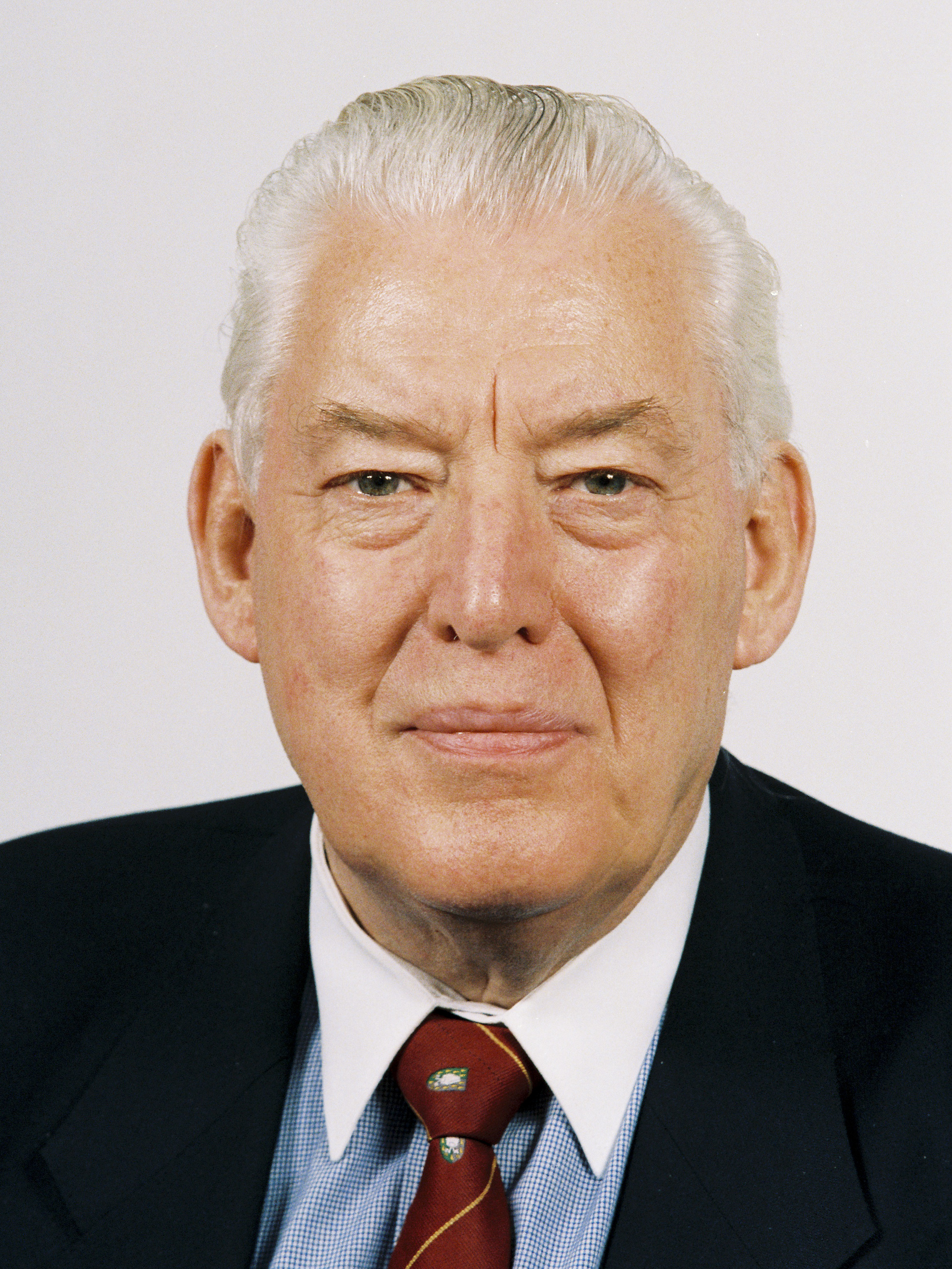
- Official MEP portrait, 1994

First Minister of Northern Ireland
- In office 8 May 2007 – 5 June 2008 Serving with Martin McGuinness
- Preceded by: Peter Hain^{[a]} (as Secretary of State for Northern Ireland); David Trimble (2002)
- Succeeded by: Peter Robinson

Leader of the Democratic Unionist Party
- In office 30 September 1971 – 31 May 2008
- Deputy: William Beattie; Peter Robinson
- Preceded by: Party established
- Succeeded by: Peter Robinson
Parliamentary offices
Member of the House of Lords
Lord Temporal
Life peerage 18 June 2010 – 12 September 2014
Member of the Legislative Assembly for North Antrim
In office 25 June 1998 – 25 March 2011
Preceded by	Constituency established
Succeeded by	David McIlveen
In office 20 October 1982 – 1986
Preceded by	Assembly re-established
Succeeded by	Assembly dissolved
In office 28 June 1973 – 1974
Preceded by	Assembly created
Succeeded by	Assembly abolished
Member of Parliament for North Antrim
In office 18 June 1970 – 12 April 2010
Preceded by	Henry Clark
Succeeded by	Ian Paisley Jr
Member of the European Parliament for Northern Ireland
In office 7 June 1979 – 10 June 2004
Preceded by	Constituency established
Succeeded by	Jim Allister
Member of the Northern Ireland Forum for North Antrim
In office 30 May 1996 – 25 April 1998
Preceded by	Forum established
Succeeded by	Forum dissolved
Member of the Northern Ireland Constitutional Convention for North Antrim
In office 1 May 1975 – 1976
Preceded by	Convention founded
Succeeded by	Convention dissolved
Member of the Northern Ireland Parliament for Bannside
In office 16 April 1970 – 18 July 1973
Preceded by	Terence O'Neill
Succeeded by	Constituency abolished

Personal details
- Born: Ian Richard Kyle Paisley; 6 April 1926 Armagh, Northern Ireland
- Died: 12 September 2014 (aged 88) Belfast, Northern Ireland
- Resting place: Ballygowan, County Down
- Party: DUP (1971–2014)
- Other political affiliations: PUP (1966–1971)
- Spouse: Eileen Cassells (m. 1956)
- Children: 5, including Rhonda and Ian Jr
- Education: Barry School of Evangelism
- Occupation: Evangelist; politician; political activist
- Profession: Minister
- Website: Official website
- a. During the periods of suspension of the Northern Ireland Executive, the Secretaries of State for Northern Ireland assumed the responsibilities of the First Minister and deputy First Minister. The final Northern Ireland Secretary to act as First Minister was Peter Hain.

Ian Richard Kyle Paisley, Baron Bannside (6 April 1926 – 12 September 2014) was a loyalist politician and Protestant religious leader from Northern Ireland who served as leader of the Democratic Unionist Party (DUP) from 1971 to 2008 and First Minister of Northern Ireland from 2007 to 2008.

Paisley became a Protestant evangelical minister in 1946 and remained one for the rest of his life. In 1951 he co-founded the Reformed fundamentalist Free Presbyterian Church of Ulster and was its leader until 2008. Paisley became known for his fiery sermons and regularly preached anti-Catholicism, anti-ecumenism and against homosexuality. He gained a large group of followers who were referred to as Paisleyites.

Paisley became involved in Ulster unionist/loyalist politics in the late 1950s. In the mid-late 1960s he led and instigated loyalist opposition to the Catholic civil rights movement in Northern Ireland. This contributed to the outbreak of the Troubles in the late 1960s, a conflict that would engulf Northern Ireland for the next 30 years. In 1970 he became Member of Parliament (MP) for North Antrim and the following year he founded the Democratic Unionist Party (DUP), which he would lead for almost 40 years. In 1979 he became a member of the European Parliament.

Throughout the Troubles, Paisley was seen as a firebrand and the face of hardline unionism. He opposed all attempts to resolve the conflict through power-sharing between unionists and Irish nationalists/republicans, and all attempts to involve the Republic of Ireland in Northern Irish affairs. His efforts helped bring down the Sunningdale Agreement of 1974. He also opposed the Anglo-Irish Agreement of 1985, with less success. His attempts to create a paramilitary movement culminated in Ulster Resistance. Paisley and his party also opposed the Northern Ireland peace process and Good Friday Agreement of 1998.

In 2005 Paisley's DUP became the largest unionist party in Northern Ireland, displacing the Ulster Unionist Party (UUP), which had dominated unionist politics since 1905 and had been an instrumental party in the Good Friday Agreement. In 2007, following the St Andrews Agreement, the DUP finally agreed to share power with republican party Sinn Féin. Paisley and Sinn Féin's Martin McGuinness became First Minister and Deputy First Minister, respectively, in May 2007. He stepped down as first minister and DUP leader in mid-2008, and was made a life peer in 2010 as Baron Bannside. He left politics in 2011.

== Personal life ==
Ian Richard Kyle Paisley was born in Armagh, County Armagh, and brought up in the town of Ballymena, County Antrim, where his father, James Kyle Paisley, was an Independent Baptist pastor who had previously served in the Ulster Volunteers under Edward Carson. Ian's mother was Scottish.

Paisley married Eileen Cassells on 13 October 1956. They had three daughters: Sharon, Rhonda and Cherith; and twin sons: Kyle and Ian. Three of their children followed their father into politics or religion: Kyle is a Free Presbyterian minister; Ian was a DUP MP; and Rhonda is a retired DUP councillor. He had a brother, Harold, who is also an evangelical fundamentalist.

Paisley saw himself primarily as an Ulsterman. Despite his hostility towards Irish republicanism and the Republic of Ireland, he also saw himself as an Irishman and said that "you cannot be an Ulsterman without being an Irishman".

== Religious career ==
When he was a teenager, Paisley decided to follow his father and become a Christian minister. He delivered his first sermon aged 16 in a mission hall in County Tyrone. In the late 1940s he undertook theological training at the Barry School of Evangelism (now called the Wales Evangelical School of Theology), and later, for a year, at the Reformed Presbyterian Theological Hall in Belfast.

By June 1950 Paisley was preaching at an 'Old Time Gospel Campaign' on waste ground off Moore Street in the lower Ravehill Road area of Belfast.

A year later a congregation of the Presbyterian Church in Ireland (PCI) was forbidden by church authorities to hold a meeting in their own church hall at which Paisley was to be the speaker. In response, the leaders of that congregation left the PCI and began a new denomination, the Free Presbyterian Church of Ulster, with Paisley, who was just 25 years old at the time. Paisley soon became the leader (or moderator) of the Free Presbyterian Church and was re-elected every year, for the next 57 years.

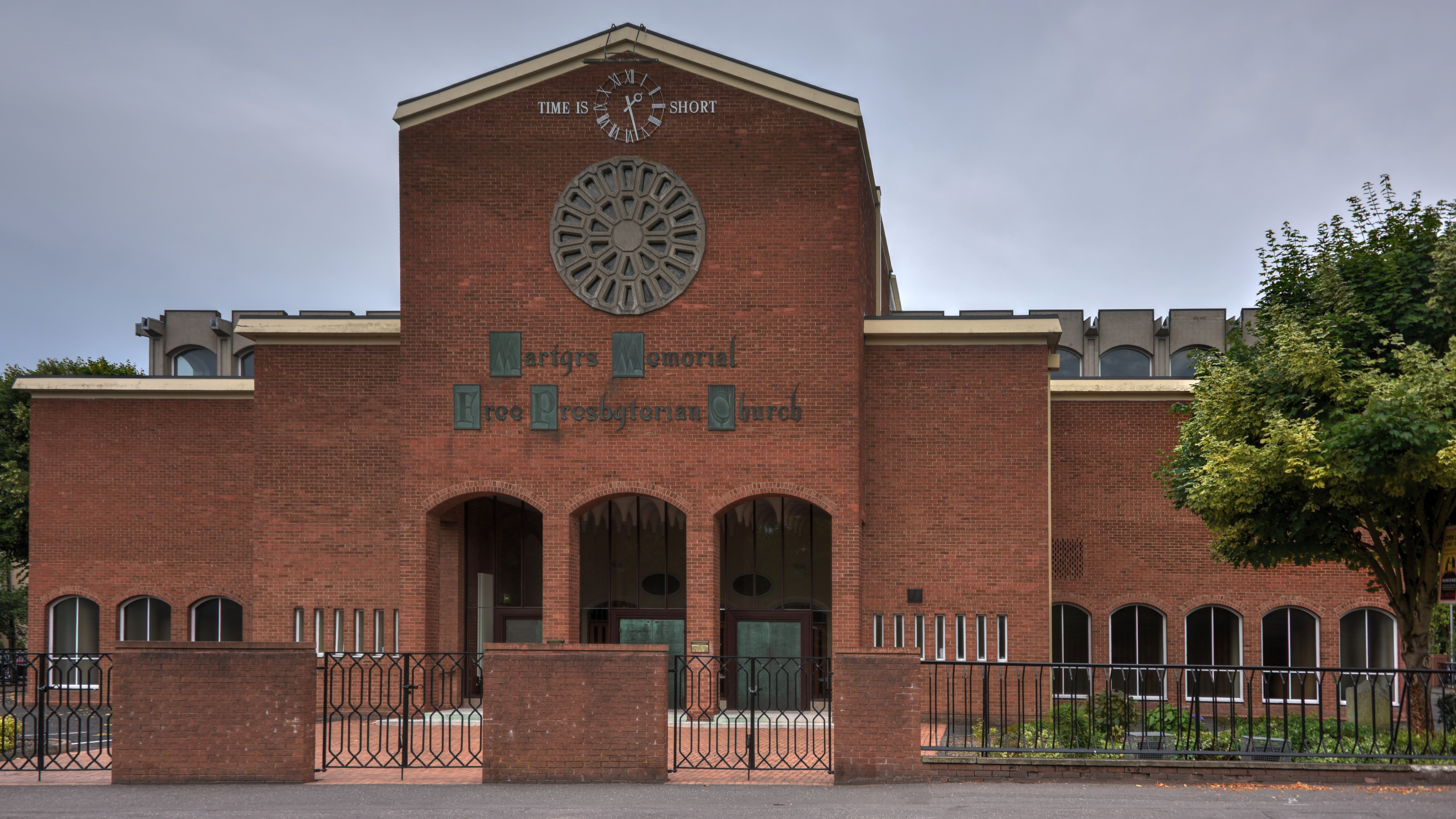
Martyrs Memorial Free Presbyterian Church, where Paisley preached

The Free Presbyterian Church is a fundamentalist, evangelical church, requiring strict separation from "any church which has departed from the fundamental doctrines of the Word of God." At the time of the 1991 census, the church had about 12,000 members, less than 1 per cent of the Northern Ireland population.

Paisley promoted a highly conservative form of Biblical literalism and anti-Catholicism, which he described as "Bible Protestantism". The website of Paisley's public relations arm, the European Institute of Protestant Studies, describes the institute's purpose as to "expound the Bible, expose the Papacy, and to promote, defend and maintain Bible Protestantism in Europe and further afield." Paisley's website describes a number of doctrinal areas in which he believes that the "Roman church" (which he termed 'Popery') has deviated from the Bible and thus from true Christianity. Over the years, Paisley would write numerous books and pamphlets on his religious and political views, including a commentary on the Epistle to the Romans. Paisley set up his own newspaper in February 1966, the Protestant Telegraph, as a mechanism for further spreading his message.

In the 1960s Paisley developed a relationship with the fundamentalist Bob Jones University located in Greenville, South Carolina. In 1966, he received an honorary doctorate of divinity from the institution and subsequently served on its board of trustees. This relationship would later lead to the establishment of the Free Presbyterian Church of North America in 1977. His honorary doctorate, along with his political obstinacy, led to Paisley's nickname of "Dr. No".

When Princess Margaret and the Queen Mother met Pope John XXIII in 1958, Paisley condemned them for "committing spiritual fornication and adultery with the Antichrist". When Pope John died in June 1963, Paisley announced to a crowd of followers that "this Romish man of sin is now in Hell!". He organised protests against the lowering of flags on public buildings to mark the Pope's death.

In 1988, having given advance warning of his intentions, Paisley interrupted a speech being delivered by Pope John Paul II in the European Parliament. Paisley shouted "I denounce you as the Antichrist!" and held up a poster reading "Pope John Paul II ANTICHRIST". Other MEPs jeered Paisley, threw papers at him and snatched his poster, but he produced another and continued shouting. He was admonished by Parliamentary President Lord Plumb, who formally excluded him. He was then forcibly removed from the chamber. Paisley claimed he was injured by other MEPs—including Otto von Habsburg—who struck him and threw objects at him.

Paisley believed the European Union is a part of a conspiracy to create a Roman Catholic superstate controlled by the Vatican. He claimed in an article that the seat no. 666 in the European Parliament is reserved for the Antichrist.

Paisley continued to denounce the Catholic Church and the Pope after the incident. In a television interview for The Unquiet Man, a 2001 documentary on Paisley's life, he expressed his pride at being "the only person to have the courage to denounce the Pope". However, after the death of Pope John Paul in 2005, Paisley expressed sympathy for Catholics, saying "We can understand how Roman Catholics feel at the death of the Pope and we would want in no way to interfere with their expression of sorrow and grief at this time."

Paisley and his followers also protested against what they saw as instances of blasphemy in popular culture, including the stage productions Jesus Christ Superstar and Jerry Springer: The Opera, as well as being strongly anti-abortion.

=== Campaign against homosexuality ===
Paisley preached against homosexuality, supported laws criminalising it and picketed various gay-rights events. He denounced it as "a crime against God and man and its practice is a terrible step to the total demoralisation of any country". Save Ulster from Sodomy was a campaign launched by Paisley in 1977, in opposition to the Northern Ireland Campaign for Homosexual Law Reform, established in 1974. Paisley's campaign sought to prevent the extension to Northern Ireland of the Sexual Offences Act 1967, which had decriminalised homosexual acts between males over 21 years of age in England and Wales. Paisley's campaign failed when legislation was passed in 1982 as a result of the previous year's ruling by the European Court of Human Rights in the case of Dudgeon v United Kingdom.

== Political career, 1949–2010 ==
=== Early activism ===
In 1949 Paisley formed a Northern Irish branch of the National Union of Protestants, the group being led in the UK by his uncle, W. St Clair Taylor. Paisley's first political involvement came at the 1950 general election when he campaigned on behalf of the successful Ulster Unionist Party (UUP) candidate in Belfast West, the Church of Ireland minister James Godfrey MacManaway. The independent Unionist MP Norman Porter came to lead the National Union of Protestants, while Paisley became treasurer, but Paisley left after Porter refused to join the Free Presbyterian Church.

Paisley first hit headlines in 1956 when Maura Lyons, a 15-year-old Belfast Catholic doubting her faith, sought his help and was smuggled illegally to Scotland by members of his Free Presbyterian Church. Paisley publicly played a tape of her religious conversion but refused to help with the search for her, saying he would rather go to prison than return her to her Catholic family. Lyons eventually returned both to her family and Catholicism.

In 1956 Paisley was one of the founders of Ulster Protestant Action (UPA). Its initial purpose was to organise the defence of Protestant areas against anticipated Irish Republican Army (IRA) activity. It carried out vigilante patrols, made street barricades, and drew up lists of IRA suspects in both Belfast and rural areas. The UPA was to later become the Protestant Unionist Party in 1966. UPA factory and workplace branches were formed, including one by Paisley in Belfast's Ravenhill area under his direct control. The concern of the UPA increasingly came to focus on the defence of 'Bible Protestantism' and Protestant interests where jobs and housing were concerned. The UPA also campaigned against the allocation of public housing to Catholics.

As Paisley came to dominate UPA, he received his first convictions for public order offences. In June 1959, Paisley addressed a UPA rally in the mainly-Protestant Shankill district of Belfast. During the speech, he shouted out the addresses of some Catholic-owned homes and businesses in the area. These homes and businesses were then attacked by the crowd; windows were smashed, shops were looted and "Taigs out" painted on the doors.

During the 1964 UK general election campaign, an Irish republican candidate displayed an Irish tricolour from the window of his office in a republican area of Belfast. Paisley threatened that if the Royal Ulster Constabulary (RUC) did not remove the tricolour he would lead a march to the office and take it down himself. The Flags and Emblems Act 1954 banned the public display of any symbol, with the exception of the Union Flag, that could cause a breach of the peace. In response, armed officers arrived at the building, smashed their way inside and seized the flag. This led to severe rioting between republicans and the RUC. Thirty people, including at least 18 officers, had to be hospitalised.

=== Opposition to the civil rights movement ===
In 1964 a peaceful civil rights campaign began in Northern Ireland. The civil rights movement sought to end discrimination against Catholics and those of Catholic background by the Protestant and unionist government of Northern Ireland. Paisley instigated and led loyalist opposition to the civil rights movement over the next few years. He also led opposition against Terence O'Neill, Prime Minister of Northern Ireland. Although O'Neill was also unionist, Paisley and his followers saw him as being too 'soft' on the civil rights movement and opposed his policies of reform and reconciliation.

In April 1966 Paisley and his associate Noel Doherty founded the Ulster Constitution Defence Committee (UCDC) and its paramilitary wing, the Ulster Protestant Volunteers (UPV). At the time, Irish republicans were marking the 50th anniversary of the Easter Rising. Although the IRA was inactive, loyalists such as Paisley warned that it was about to be revived and launch another campaign against Northern Ireland. At the same time, a loyalist paramilitary group calling itself the Ulster Volunteer Force (UVF) emerged in the Shankill area of Belfast, led by Gusty Spence. Many of its members were also members of the UCDC and UPV, including UCDC secretary and UPV leader Noel Doherty. Paisley publicly thanked the UVF for taking part in a march on 7 April. Paisley forced the Stormont government to mobilise B-Specials for the entire month of April with the hope of outlawing public commemoration of the fiftieth anniversary of the 1916 Easter Rising. Paisley failed in this objective but did succeed in pressuring the government to ban trains from the Republic transporting people to Northern Ireland for the ceremonies. In May and June the UVF petrol bombed a number of Catholic homes, schools and businesses. It also shot dead two Catholic civilians as they walked home. These are sometimes seen as the first deaths of the Troubles. Following the killings, the UVF was outlawed and Paisley denied any knowledge of its activities. One of those convicted for the killings said after his arrest "I am terribly sorry I ever heard of that man Paisley or decided to follow him".

Paisley would later establish two other paramilitary groups: Third Force in 1981 and Ulster Resistance in 1986.

On 6 June 1966 Paisley led a march to the General Assembly of the Presbyterian Church against what he claimed to be its "Romeward trend". The authorities allowed the marchers to go through the Catholic Cromac Square neighbourhood carrying placards with anti-Catholic slogans. Catholic youths attacked the march and clashed with the RUC. Many were injured and cars and businesses were wrecked. Following the riots, Paisley was charged with unlawful assembly and sentenced to three months in prison. The Belfast Telegraph declared that Paisley's organisations "represent a defiance of lawful authority no less serious in essence than that of the IRA". On 22 July 1966, Paisleyites clashed with the RUC outside Crumlin Road Prison, where Paisley was being held. The next day, Protestant mobs several thousand strong "rampaged through the city, smashing windows and trying to damage businesses owned by Catholics". In response, the authorities banned all meetings and marches in Belfast for three months.

On 30 November 1968, hours before a civil rights march in Armagh, Paisley and Ronald Bunting arrived in the town in a convoy of cars. Men armed with nail-studded cudgels emerged from the cars and took over the town centre to prevent the march. The RUC halted the civil rights march, sparking outrage from activists. On 25 March 1969, Paisley and Bunting were jailed for organising the illegal counter-demonstration. On 6 May, they were released during a general amnesty for people convicted of political offences.

In March–April 1969, the Ulster Protestant Volunteers (UPV) bombed water and electricity installations in Northern Ireland, leaving much of Belfast without power and water. Paisley and the UPV blamed the bombings on the dormant IRA and elements of the civil rights movement. Paisley's Protestant Telegraph called them "the first act of sabotage perpetrated by the IRA since the murderous campaign of 1956", warning that it was "an ominous indication of what lies ahead for Ulster". Many people believed these claims of IRA responsibility. The loyalists also hoped that the bombings would weaken confidence in Prime Minister Terence O'Neill. Unionist support for O'Neill waned, and on 28 April he resigned as Prime Minister. Paisley's approach led him, in turn, to oppose O'Neill's successors as Prime Minister, Major James Chichester-Clark (later Lord Moyola) and Brian Faulkner.

The civil rights campaign, and attacks on it by loyalists and police, culminated in the August 1969 riots. The riots in Divis Street were the worst in Belfast since the 1930s. Catholic Irish nationalists clashed with the police and with loyalists, who invaded Catholic neighbourhoods and burned scores of homes and businesses. This led to the deployment of British troops and is seen by many as the beginning of the Troubles. Journalists Patrick Bishop and Eamonn Mallie said of the rioting in Belfast: "Both communities were in the grip of a mounting paranoia about the other's intentions. Catholics were convinced that they were about to become victims of a Protestant pogrom; Protestants that they were on the eve of an IRA insurrection". After the riots, Paisley is reported to have said: "Catholic homes caught fire because they were loaded with petrol bombs; Catholic churches were attacked and burned because they were arsenals and priests handed out sub-machine guns to parishioners".

The British Army and nationalist MP Gerry Fitt believed that loyalist extremists linked to Paisley were behind a number of bomb attacks in the spring of 1970 blamed on the newly emerged Provisional IRA. Fitt also alleged that the explosions of 1969, the work of the UVF with which Paisley had "a close connection", were designed to cause "the downfall of the Northern Ireland Government and particularly of Captain O'Neill". These attacks included one during which Thomas McDowell, from Kilkeel, County Down, died from electrocution as he attempted to place a bomb at a power station at Ballyshannon, County Donegal. UVF member McDowell was also a member of the UPV and the Free Presbyterian Church.

=== Electoral success and founding of the DUP ===
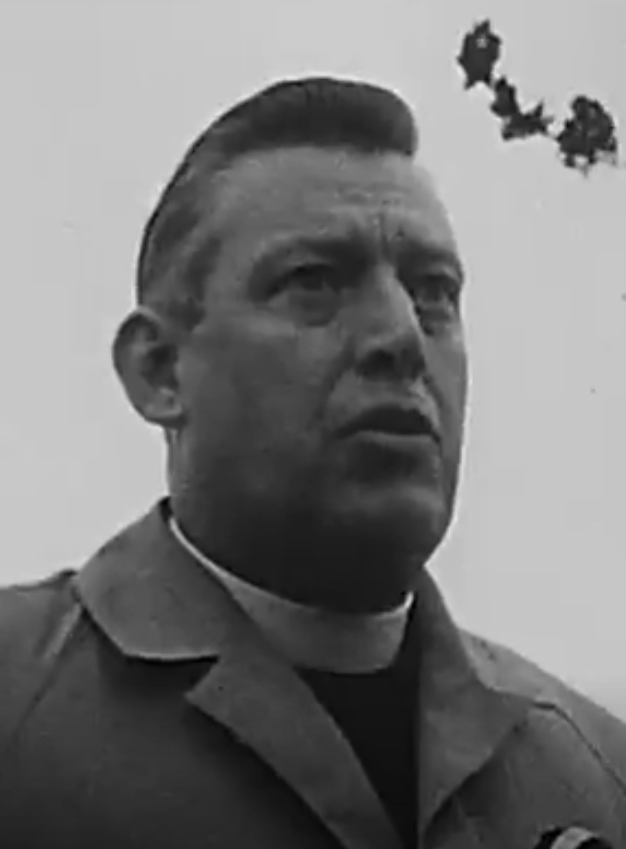
Paisley in 1970

On 16 April 1970, in a by-election to the Northern Ireland Parliament, Paisley, standing on behalf of the Protestant Unionist Party, won the Bannside seat formerly held by Prime Minister Terence O'Neill. Another PUP candidate, William Beattie, won the South Antrim seat. In the 1970 UK general election, Paisley won the North Antrim seat. These elections were "further evidence of the break-up of the unionist block and the unease among a large section of Protestants about the reform measures introduced under Chichester-Clark".

On 30 September 1971 Paisley and Desmond Boal founded the Democratic Unionist Party (DUP).

=== Relationship with the nationalist SDLP ===
From the 1960s, one of his main rivals was civil rights leader and co-founder of the nationalist Social Democratic and Labour Party (SDLP), John Hume. British Government papers, released in 2002, show that in 1971 Paisley attempted to reach a compromise with the Social Democratic and Labour Party (SDLP). The attempt was made via then British Cabinet Secretary, Sir Burke Trend. The papers show that Paisley had indicated he could "reach an accommodation with leaders of the Catholic minority, which would provide the basis of a new government in Stormont." It appears that the move was rejected once it became clear to the SDLP that it would have created a very one-sided alliance. Speaking about the deal in 2002 Paisley said:

The SDLP did not want to go along the road that we would have wanted them to go. I wouldn't say there were talks, there was an exchange of views between us, but it never got anywhere. We were prepared to try and seek a way whereby we could govern Northern Ireland and that people of both faiths could be happy with the way it was being governed, but it all rested on the key point – the person with power would be the person that the people gave the power.

Promoting the DUP's manifesto at a launch event ahead of the 1983 UK general election Paisley made clear that the core message of the party's campaign would be to "expose and oppose Provisional Sinn Fein and its fellow travellers, the SDLP." Responding to reporters, Paisley said:

[The SDLP] are going down the same united Ireland road as Sinn Fein, so they are fellow travellers. We will be taking on the Sinn Fein frontmen for the IRA and are determined to smash them at the polls.

Speaking at the launch of the DUP's policy proposals for devolved government for the briefly revived Northern Ireland Assembly in September 1984, Paisley echoed the document's position on power-sharing with the SDLP:

I am totally opposed to power-sharing because it is unworkable and destroys the very principle of my Unionism, which is that we are part of the UK and cannot in any way bring into government those who want to destroy Northern Ireland.

In one interview during the referendum campaign following the signing of the 1998 Good Friday Agreement, he declared that he was 'opposed to power-sharing with nationalists because nationalists are only power-sharing to destroy Northern Ireland' clearly meaning the SDLP as well as Sinn Féin.

=== Campaign against the Sunningdale Agreement ===
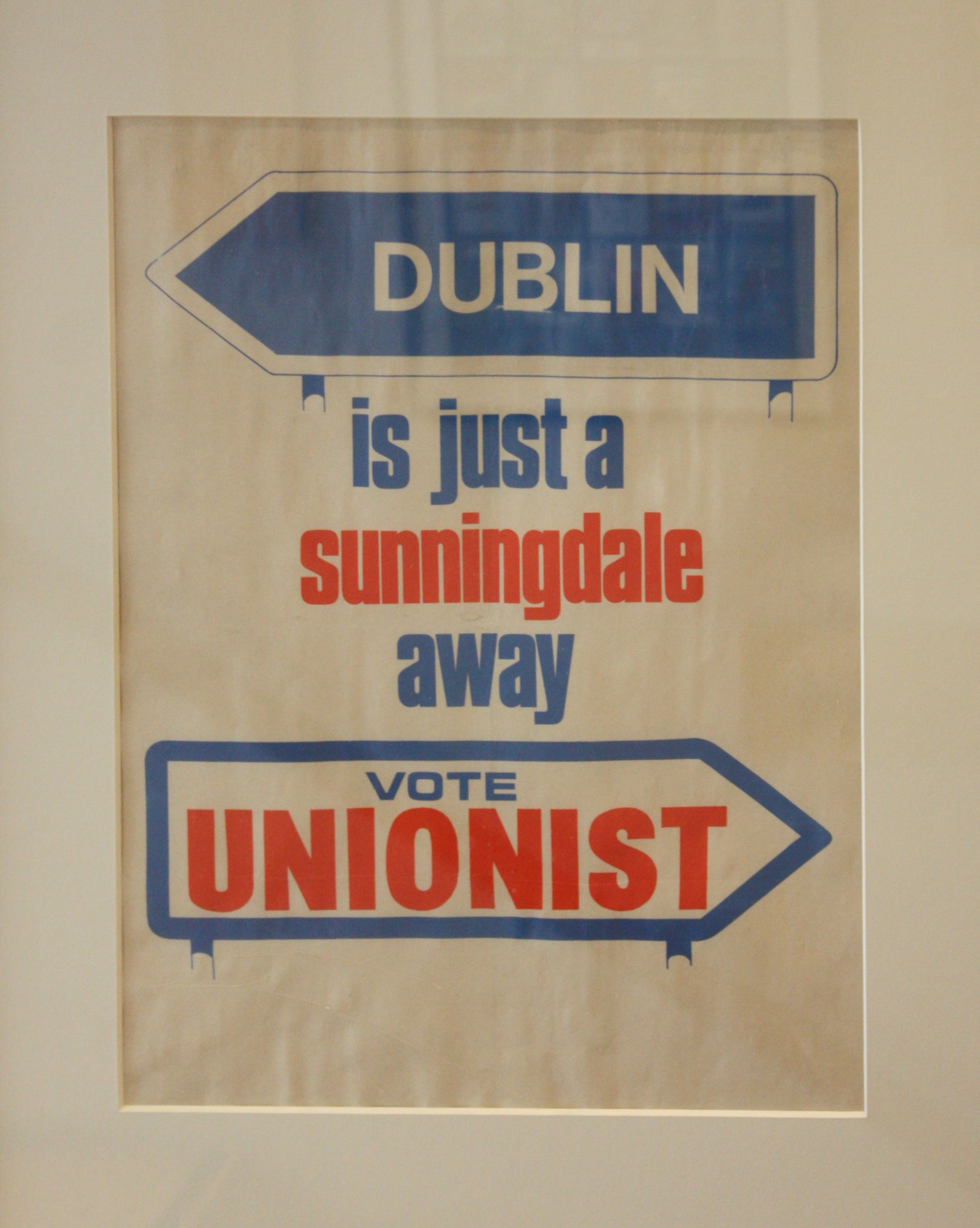
A United Ulster Unionist poster, warning that the Sunningdale Agreement would lead to "Dublin Rule" (i.e. a united Ireland)

The Sunningdale Agreement of December 1973 set up a new government for Northern Ireland in which unionists and nationalists would share power. It also proposed the creation of a Council of Ireland, which would facilitate co-ordination and co-operation between the governments of Northern Ireland and the Republic of Ireland. Paisley and other hardline unionists opposed the Agreement. Specifically, they opposed sharing political power with nationalists and saw the Council of Ireland as a step towards a united Ireland.

Paisley, along with anti-Agreement Ulster Unionist Party leader Harry West and Ulster Vanguard leader William Craig, formed the United Ulster Unionist Council (UUUC) to oppose the Agreement. Its slogan was Dublin is just a Sunningdale away. Loyalists formed the Ulster Workers' Council (UWC) to mobilise loyalist workers against the Agreement, while the loyalist paramilitary groups (UDA, UVF etc.) formed the Ulster Army Council (UAC) to co-ordinate their response.

Addressing an anti-Agreement rally in January 1974, Paisley declared:

Mr Faulkner says it's 'hands across the border' to Dublin. I say if they don't behave themselves in the South, it will be shots across the border!

On 15 May 1974 the UWC called a general strike aimed at bringing down the Agreement and the new government. A co-ordinating committee was set up to help organise the strike. It included Paisley and the other UUUC leaders, the leaders of the UWC, and the heads of the loyalist paramilitary groups. Its chairman was Glenn Barr, a high-ranking member of Ulster Vanguard and the UDA. In its first meeting, Barr arrived late and found Paisley sitting at the head of the table. Barr told him "you might be chairman of the Democratic Unionist Party but I'm chairman of the co-ordinating committee, so move over". Paisley moved from the head of the table but carried the chair away with him and the two argued over the chair itself, with Paisley eventually allowed to keep it as he claimed to need a chair with arms due to back pain.

The strike lasted fourteen days and brought Northern Ireland to a standstill. Loyalist paramilitaries helped to enforce the strike by blocking roads and intimidating workers. On 17 May, the third day of the strike, loyalists detonated four car bombs in Dublin and Monaghan, in the Republic of Ireland. The bombs killed 33 civilians and injured 300, making it the deadliest attack of the Troubles, and the deadliest terrorist attack in the Republic's history. In an interview nine months before his death, Paisley said he was "shocked" by the bombings, but claimed that the Republic's government provoked the attack. The strike led to the downfall of the Agreement on 28 May.

=== Unionist Action Council strike ===
In 1977 the United Unionist Action Council (UUAC) was formed out of the UUUC. The council was chaired by Joseph Burns and included Paisley, Ernest Baird (leader of the United Ulster Unionist Movement), members of the Ulster Workers' Council, and leaders of loyalist paramilitaries including the UDA, Orange Volunteers and Down Orange Welfare. The UUAC also established its own loyalist vigilante group called the Ulster Service Corps (USC).

On 3 May 1977 the UUAC organised a general strike. It was seen by the public as "Paisley's strike", due to his prominent role in it. The main aims of the strike were to restore devolved government to Northern Ireland under a system of simple majority (i.e. unionist) rule and to force the British Government to introduce tougher security measures against the IRA. As in 1974, loyalist paramilitaries tried to enforce the strike by blocking roads, intimidating workers and attacking businesses that refused to co-operate. However, unlike in 1974, many workers refused to join the strike and the security forces were better prepared. The Ulster Service Corps set up roadblocks and carried out patrols in rural areas. Some members carried guns, although these were generally legally-held firearms. During a speech in the House of Commons, Paisley claimed to have taken part in some of these patrols and encouraged his supporters to join the group. On 10 May, Protestant bus driver Harry Bradshaw was shot dead by loyalists for working during the strike, and UDR soldier John Geddis was killed when loyalists bombed a petrol station that had stayed open. That same day, Paisley, Baird and other members of the UUAC were arrested at a roadblock outside Ballymena. Paisley was charged with obstruction of the highway and then released.

On 13 May the strike was called off. The strike was widely seen as a failure, but Paisley—who had said he would quit politics if it failed—declared it a success and continued his career. The RUC later reported that three people had been killed by loyalists during the strike, 41 RUC officers had been injured, there had been thousands of reports of intimidation, and 115 people had been charged with offences.

=== Election to European Parliament ===
Paisley opposed the European Economic Community (EEC) but stood for election to the European Parliament to give a platform to his views and those of his supporters. In June 1979, in the first election to the European Parliament, Paisley won one of the three Northern Ireland seats. He topped the poll, with 29.8% of the first preference votes. On 17 July, Paisley interrupted the opening proceedings of the European Parliament to protest that the Union Jack outside the building was flying upside down. Louise Weiss, who presided over the Parliament, dealt with the interruption swiftly and later said of it that she was used to dealing with "recalcitrant youngsters". On 18 July, Paisley tried to interrupt Jack Lynch—then Taoiseach (Irish prime minister) and President of the European Council—as he was making a speech in the Parliament. Paisley was shouted down by other MEPs.

Paisley easily retained his seat in every European election until he stood down in 2004, receiving the highest popular vote of any British MEP (although as Northern Ireland used a different electoral system from Great Britain for European elections, the figures are not strictly comparable).

=== Third Force ===
During 1981, Paisley attempted to create a Protestant loyalist volunteer militia—called the (Ulster) Third Force—which would work alongside the police and army to fight the IRA. At the time, Prime Minister Margaret Thatcher was holding talks with Taoiseach Charles Haughey, and the Irish republican hunger strike was underway.

On the night of 6 February 1981 Paisley summoned journalists to a hillside in County Antrim, where he had gathered 500 men. The men were photographed in military formation, waving what purported to be firearms certificates in the air. Paisley declared: "This is a small token of the men who are placed to devastate any attempt by Margaret Thatcher and Charles Haughey to destroy the Union". He added: "I will take full responsibility for anything these men do. We will stop at nothing."

Paisley helped to organise further night-time rallies on 1 April, where large groups of men brandished more pieces of paper. They were held on hillsides near Gortin, Armagh and Newry. At Gortin, the police were attacked and two police vehicles overturned. On 16 November, Paisley addressed a large Third Force rally in Enniskillen, where hundreds of men marched in a show of strength. Paisley organised a loyalist 'Day of Action' on 23 November, to pressure the British government to take a harder line against the IRA. Rallies were held in Protestant areas of Northern Ireland and a number of businesses shut. The DUP and UUP held separate rallies at Belfast City Hall. That night, Paisley addressed a Third Force rally in Newtownards, where thousands of masked and uniformed men marched before him. He declared:

My men are ready to be recruited under the crown to destroy the vermin of the IRA. But if they refuse to recruit them, then we will have no other decision to make but to destroy the IRA ourselves!

On 3 December Paisley claimed that the Third Force had 15,000–20,000 members. James Prior, Secretary of State for Northern Ireland, replied that private armies would not be tolerated.

In December 1981 the United States Department of State revoked Paisley's visa, citing his "divisive rhetoric" and forcing him to cancel plans for a two-week speaking and fundraising tour in the US. He insisted the cancellation was part of a "conspiracy between the Thatcher Government and the U.S.A. Government to sell out Ulster".

=== Campaign against the Anglo-Irish Agreement ===
The Anglo-Irish Agreement was signed by the British and Irish governments on 15 November 1985, following months of talks between the two governments. The Agreement confirmed that there would be no change in the status of Northern Ireland without the consent of a majority of its citizens, and set out conditions for the creation of a power-sharing government for Northern Ireland. It also gave the Irish government an advisory role on political, legal and security matters in Northern Ireland.

Led by Paisley and UUP leader James Molyneaux, unionists mounted a major protest campaign against the Agreement, dubbed "Ulster Says No". Both unionist parties resigned their seats in the British House of Commons, suspended district council meetings, and supported a campaign of mass civil disobedience. There were strikes and mass protest rallies. On 23 November 1985, more than 100,000 people attended a rally at Belfast City Hall. The rally was addressed by Paisley and Molyneaux. In his address, Paisley stated:

Where do the terrorists operate from? From the Irish Republic! Where do the terrorists return to for sanctuary? To the Irish Republic! And yet Mrs Thatcher tells us that the Republic must have some say in our Province. We say 'Never! Never! Never! Never!'

On 23 June 1986 Paisley and 21 other unionist politicians occupied the Stormont Parliament Building in protest at the Agreement, while 200 supporters protested outside and clashed with police. Paisley and the others were forcibly removed by police the next day. He shouted at police officers: "Don't come crying to me if your homes are attacked. You will reap what you sow!" During the campaign against the Agreement, loyalist militants attacked the homes of over 500 police officers, forcing 150 families to move. That evening, he addressed an Ulster Clubs rally in Larne and warned:

If the British government force us down the road to a united Ireland we will fight to the death! [...] This could come to hand-to-hand fighting in every street in Northern Ireland. We are on the verge of civil war [...] We are asking people to be ready for the worst and I will lead them.

On 10 July Paisley and deputy DUP leader Peter Robinson led 4,000 loyalists in an early morning protest in which they 'took over' and 'occupied' the town of Hillsborough in protest against the Agreement. Hillsborough Castle is where the Agreement had been signed. One month later, Robinson led a loyalist invasion of the village of Clontibret in the Republic of Ireland. Robinson was arrested and charged for his part in the incident. Paisley and many loyalist supporters travelled south to support him during his court appearance in Dundalk. Their singing of loyalist songs outside the courthouse led to rioting, causing Paisley and Robinson to lodge a formal complaint with the Foreign Office about what they said was inadequate protection.

On 10 November 1986 a large private rally was held in the Ulster Hall. At the rally Paisley and DUP members Peter Robinson and Ivan Foster announced the formation of the Ulster Resistance Movement (URM). This was a loyalist paramilitary organisation whose purpose was to "take direct action as and when required" to bring down the Agreement and defeat republicanism. Paisley, who stood on the platform in a red beret, said "there are many like myself who'd like to see the Agreement brought down by democratic means, but wouldn't we all be fools if we weren't prepared". Other recruitment rallies were held in towns across Northern Ireland and the movement was organised into nine 'battalions'. The following year, the URM helped smuggle a large shipment of weapons into Northern Ireland, which were shared out between the URM, UVF and UDA. Most, but not all, of the weaponry, was seized by police in 1988. In 1989, URM members attempted to trade Shorts' missile blueprints for weapons from the apartheid South African regime. Following these revelations, the DUP said that it had cut its links with the URM in 1987.

On 9 December 1986 Paisley was once again ejected from the European Parliament for continually interrupting a speech by Thatcher.

=== Drumcree dispute ===
Paisley was involved in the Drumcree dispute during the late 1980s and 1990s. He supported the right of the Orange Order, a Protestant unionist fraternal organisation, to march through the Catholic part of Portadown. The Catholic residents sought to ban the yearly march from their area, seeing it as sectarian, triumphalist and supremacist. Paisley was a former member of the Orange Order and belonged to a similar Protestant brotherhood: the Apprentice Boys. He also addressed the yearly gathering of the Independent Orange Order.

On 30 March 1986 a loyalist march was banned from the Catholic district. At midnight, 3,000 loyalists gathered in the town centre. Led by Paisley, they forced their way past police and marched through the Catholic district. Residents claimed that some of the marchers were carrying guns and that police did little to stop the loyalists attacking their homes. This led to severe rioting between residents and the police.

In July 1995, residents succeeded in stopping the Orange march from entering their area. Thousands of Orangemen and loyalists engaged in a standoff with the police and army at Drumcree Church. Paisley addressed a rally at Drumcree, telling a crowd of thousands:

We will die if necessary rather than surrender! If we don't win this battle all is lost. It is a matter of life and death; it is a matter of Ulster or the Irish Republic; it is a matter of freedom or slavery!

Afterwards, Paisley gathered a throng of Orangemen and tried to push through the police lines, but was arrested. Loyalists threw missiles at the police and tried to break through the blockade; police responded with plastic bullets. In support of the Orangeman, loyalists blocked roads across Northern Ireland, and there were attacks on Catholics and the police. The march was eventually allowed to continue through the Catholic area. As the march ended, Paisley and David Trimble held hands in the air in what appeared to be a gesture of triumph, causing considerable ill-feeling among the Catholic residents.

=== Campaign against the Good Friday Agreement ===
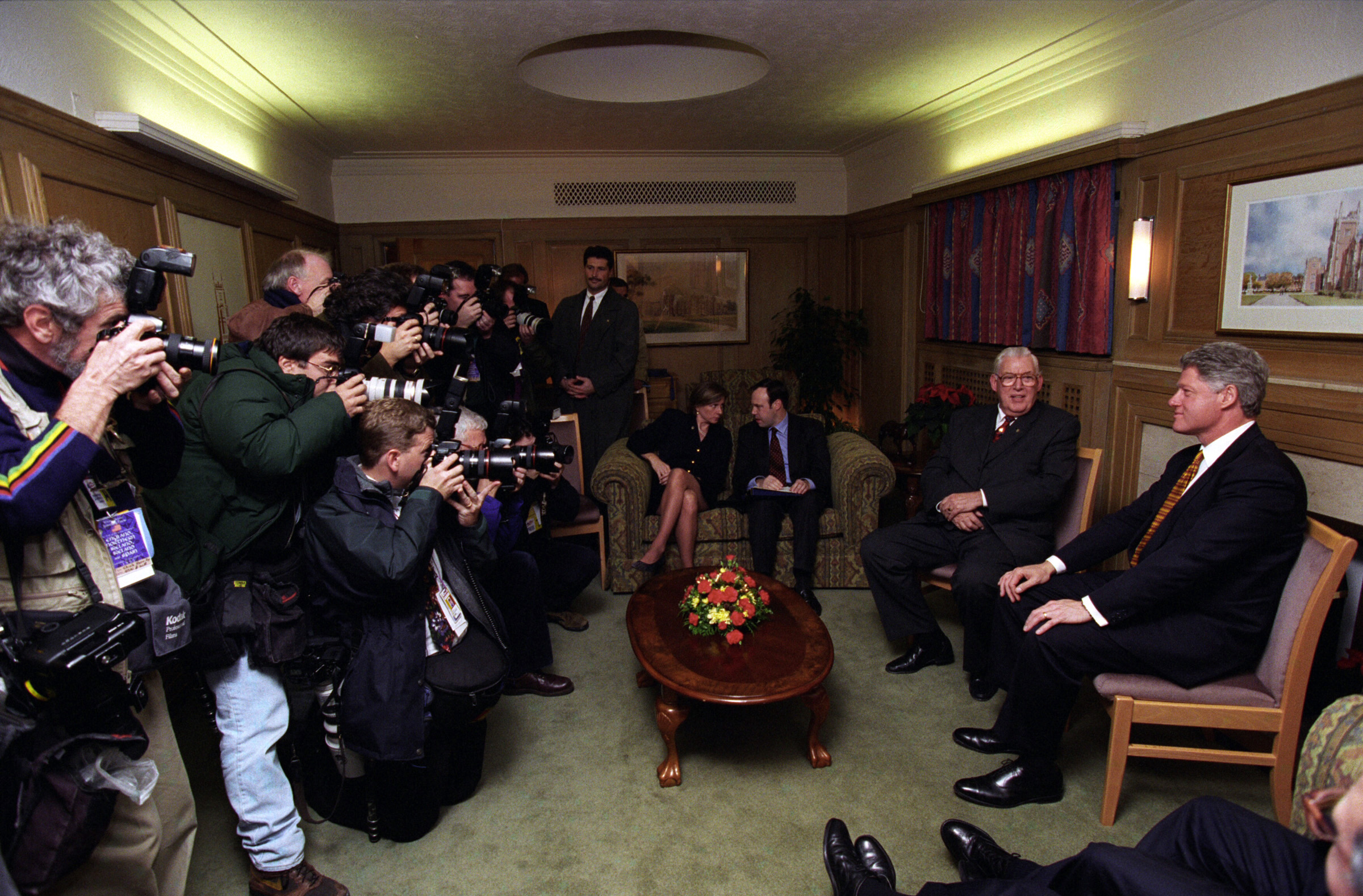
Paisley with U.S. President Bill Clinton in 1995

Paisley's DUP was initially involved in the negotiations under the former United States Senator George J. Mitchell that eventually led to the Good Friday Agreement in 1998, but the party withdrew in protest when Sinn Féin was allowed to participate after the Provisional IRA's 1994 ceasefire. Instead, Paisley travelled to Cameroon with the documentary filmmaker Jon Ronson, filming an episode of the television series Witness called "Dr Paisley, I Presume". Paisley and his party opposed the Agreement in the referendum that followed its signing, which saw it approved by over 70% of the voters in Northern Ireland and by over 90% of voters in the Republic of Ireland.

Although Paisley often stressed his loyalty to the Crown, he accused Queen Elizabeth II of being Tony Blair's "parrot" when she voiced approval of the Agreement.

The DUP fought the resulting election to the Northern Ireland Assembly, to which Paisley was elected while keeping his seats in the Westminster and European parliaments. The DUP took two seats in the multi-party power-sharing executive (Paisley, like the leaders of the nationalist Social Democratic and Labour Party (SDLP) and Sinn Féin chose not to become a minister) but those DUP members serving as ministers (Peter Robinson and Nigel Dodds) refused to attend meetings of the Executive Committee (cabinet) in protest at Sinn Féin's participation.

Paisley assumed the chairmanship of the Agriculture Committee of the Northern Ireland Assembly created by the Belfast Agreement. The Minister for Agriculture, the SDLP's Bríd Rodgers, remarked that she and Paisley had a "workmanlike" relationship.

=== 2000s: compromise and power ===
Paisley, George W. Bush and Martin McGuinness in December 2007

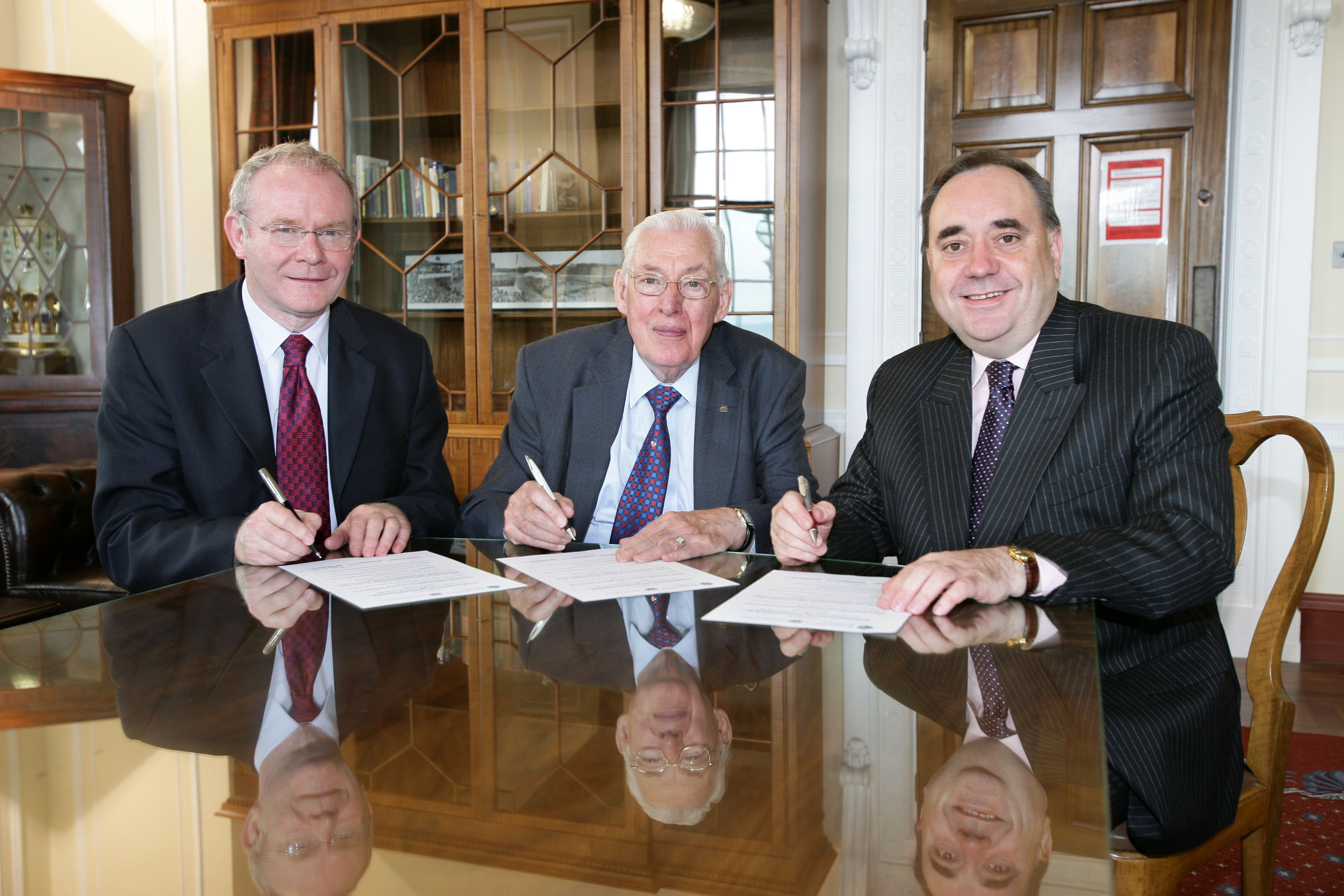
McGuinness, Paisley and the first minister of Scotland, Alex Salmond, in 2008

At the age of 78 Paisley retired from his European Parliament seat at the 2004 elections and was succeeded by Jim Allister. In September 2004 he agreed to meet Taoiseach Bertie Ahern, in his political capacity as leader of the DUP. At an early meeting with Ahern at the Irish embassy in London, he requested breakfast and asked for boiled eggs; when Ahern asked him why he had wanted boiled eggs, he quipped "it would be hard for you to poison them". Following rumours and a marked change in his appearance, it was confirmed in July 2004 that Paisley had been undergoing tests for an undisclosed illness, and in 2005 Ian Paisley Jr confirmed that his father had been gravely ill. Paisley himself later said that he had "walked in death's shadow."

Paisley again retained his North Antrim seat at the 2005 UK general election. In 2005 he was made a Privy Counsellor, an appointment traditionally bestowed upon leaders of political parties in the British Parliament. In the October 2006 St Andrews Agreement, Paisley and the DUP agreed to new elections, and support for a new executive including Sinn Féin subject to Sinn Féin acceptance of the Police Service of Northern Ireland, the successor to the Royal Ulster Constabulary. This reversed half a century of opposition to Sinn Féin, such as his comments four months previously on 12 July in Portrush, following Orange Order parades, when he said, "[Sinn Fein] are not fit to be in partnership with decent people. They are not fit to be in the government of Northern Ireland and it will be over our dead bodies if they ever get there." Sinn Féin subsequently endorsed the PSNI, and in the subsequent election Paisley and the DUP received an increased share of the vote and increased their assembly seats from 30 to 36. On Monday 26 March 2007, the date of the British Government deadline for devolution or dissolution, Paisley led a DUP delegation to a meeting with a Sinn Féin delegation led by Gerry Adams, which agreed on a DUP proposal that the executive would be established on 8 May.

On 8 May 2007 power was devolved, the Assembly met, and Paisley and Sinn Féin's Martin McGuinness were elected First Minister and Deputy First Minister of Northern Ireland.

Speaking at Stormont to an invited international audience he said, "Today at long last we are starting upon the road—I emphasise starting—which I believe will take us to lasting peace in our province." Paisley and McGuinness subsequently established a good working relationship and were dubbed the "Chuckle Brothers" by the Northern Irish media. In September 2007, he confirmed that he would contest North Antrim at the 2010 general election as well as serving the full four years as First Minister, stating "I might as well make hay while the sun shines."

In 2007 Paisley was named as "Opposition Parliamentarian of the Year" in The House Magazine Parliamentary Awards and by The Spectator as "Marathon Man of the Year." Following his January 2008 retirement as leader of the Free Presbyterian Church and pressure from party insiders, on 4 March 2008, Paisley announced that he would stand down as DUP leader and First Minister of Northern Ireland in May 2008. On 17 April Peter Robinson was elected unopposed as leader of the DUP and succeeded Paisley as first minister at a special sitting of the assembly on 5 June 2008. On 2 March 2010 it was announced that Paisley would step down as a Member of Parliament at that year's general election. His son Ian Paisley Jr was elected to succeed him in the seat at the general election on 6 May 2010.

On 18 June 2010 Paisley was created a life peer as Baron Bannside, of North Antrim in the County of Antrim, and he was introduced in the House of Lords on 5 July 2010. Bannside was the Northern Ireland Parliament constituency Paisley had won in 1970; he opted not to take a title based on his surname as his wife was already in the House as Baroness Paisley of St George's and he said that it would have implied she was "sitting not in her own right but as my wife".

== Final years and death (2010–14) ==
In November 2011 Paisley announced to his congregation, which he had led for over 60 years, that he would retire as minister. He delivered his final sermon to a packed attendance at the Martyrs' Memorial Hall on 18 December 2011, and finally retired from his religious ministry at the age of 85, on 27 January 2012.

In February 2012 Paisley was admitted to hospital with heart problems. Jim Flanagan, editor of the Ballymena Guardian, who spoke to close family friends, said that Paisley had been able to communicate "to some degree" with family members. A year before, he had had a pacemaker fitted due to cardiac arrhythmia, during his time in the Lords. In late December 2013 Paisley was once again taken to hospital for "necessary tests". Ian Paisley Jr emphasised that they were routine.

Paisley died in Belfast on 12 September 2014, aged 88. His body was buried at Ballygowan in County Down on 15 September following a private funeral, and a public memorial for 830 invited guests was held in the Ulster Hall on 19 October. An obituary in The New York Times reported that late in life Paisley had moderated and softened his stances against Roman Catholics but that "the legacies of fighting and religious hatreds remained."

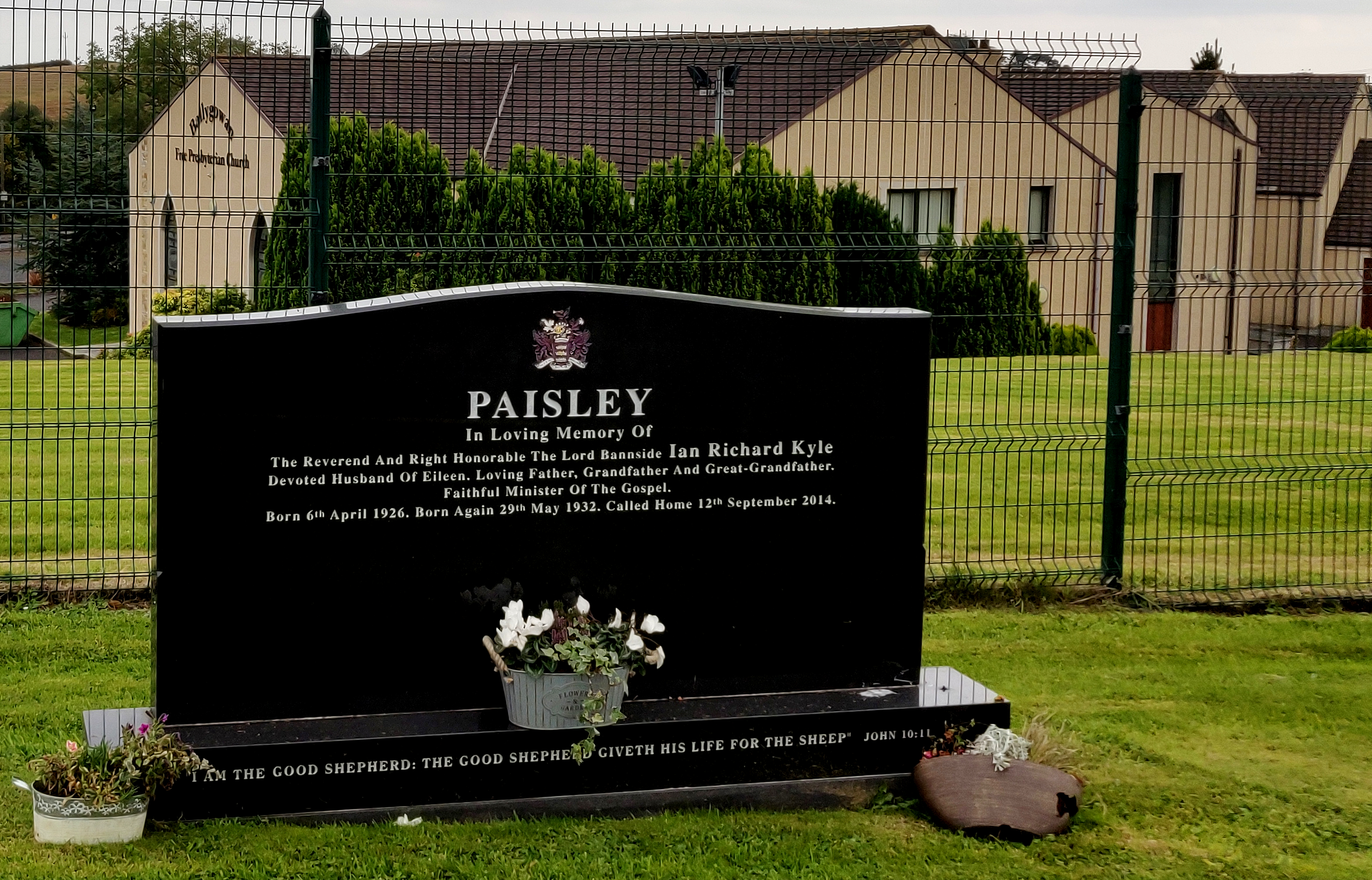
Paisley grave at Free Presbyterian Church, Ballygowan, Co. Down

== Bibliography ==
- The Protestant Reformation: The Preaching of Ian R. K. Paisley: Four Biographical Sermons: Martin Luther, John Calvin, John Knox, William Tyndale (Audio CD)
- The Soul of the Question and the Question of the Soul
- Christian Foundations
- Protestants Remember!
- Union with Rome: The Courtship and Proposed Marriage of Protestantism by Romanism and the Objections Thereto (Ravenhill pulpit) (Ravenhill pulpit)
- Ravenhill Pulpit: The Preaching of Ian R.K. Paisley
- Souvenir booklet: The 50th Anniversary of the Larne Gun-Running (Ravenhill pulpit) (Ravenhill pulpit)
- The Five Protestant Bishops whom Rome Burned: John Hooper, Robert Ferrar, Hugh Latimer, Nicholas Ridley, Thomas Cranmer
- Jesus Christ: Not Able to Sin
- No Pope Here
- God's Ultimatum to the Nation
- Getting Your Priorities Right (Martyr's memorial pulpit) (Martyr's memorial pulpit)
- The Authority of the Scriptures vs. the Confusion of Translations: Dr. Ian Paisley Thunders Out For the King James Version and its texts! (B.F.T)
- Exposition of the Epistle to the Romans (Ian R.K. Paisley Library)
- Classic Sermons
- George Whitefield
- Messages from the Prison Cell
- Sermons With Startling Titles
- Betrayal of our National Heritage
- U.D.I.
- The Unaged Birth and the Unembellished Gospel
- Some Kidd But Definitely No Goat!: The Story of the Witty, the Learned, the Eccentric and the Controversial Dr. Kidd of Aberdeen
- For Such a Time as This
- The Ulster Problem, Spring 1972: A Discussion of the True Situation in Northern Ireland
- The Living Bible: The Livid Libel of the Scriptures of Truth: an Exposure of the So-called Bible for Everyone
- The Jesuits: Their Start, Sign, System, Secrecy, Strategy
- The Archbishop in the Arms of the Pope of Rome!: Protestant Ministers in the Hands of the Police of Rome!
- Three great reformers
- The Massacre of St. Bartholomew: A Record of Papal Terror and Protestant Triumph in France in the Sixteenth Century
- Billy Graham and the Church of Rome
- False Views by Modern Man: An Exposure of "Good News for Modern Man — The New Testament — Today's English Version"
- Grow Old Along With Me
- Paisley: The Man and his Message
- The Ecumenical Nightmare: Church Unity in 1980!
- Text a Day Keeps the Evil Away
- Into the Millennium: 20th century Messages for 21st century Living
- The Rent Veils at Calvary
- The Fundamentalist and his State: Address delivered on 15 June 1976 to the World Congress of Fundamentalists meeting at Usher Hall, Edinburgh
- America's Debt to Ulster
- The Crown of Thorns
- An Enemy has Done This: Terror and Treachery in Northern Ireland
- Expository Sermons
- The Garments of Christ
- My Plea for the Old Sword
- Christian Foundations
- Sermons for Special Occasions
- Paisley's Pocket Preacher: Thumbnail gospel sermons
- The Livid Libel of the Scriptures of Truth: An Exposure of the So-called Bible in Everyday Language for Everyone (B.F.T)
- The Revised English Bible; The Antichrist Bible (an exposure)
- Be Sure
- Ulster: The Facts
- The Crown Rights of Jesus Christ: An address delivered by request before the General Synod of the Bible Presbyterian Church of America
- An Exposition of the Epistle to the Romans,: Prepared in the Prison Cell
- The Common Bible (Revised Standard Version): The Bible of the Antichrist
- Benjamin Wills Newton Maligned But Magnificent: A Centenary Tribute, 1999
- The 59 Revival: An Authentic History of the Great Ulster Awakening of 1859

Party political offices
New political party	Leader of the Democratic Unionist Party; 1971–2008	Succeeded by Peter Robinson
Parliament of Northern Ireland
Preceded by Terence O'Neill	Member of Parliament for Bannside; 1970–1973	Parliament abolished
Parliament of the United Kingdom
Preceded by Henry Clark	Member of Parliament for North Antrim; 1970–2010	Succeeded by Ian Paisley Jr
Northern Ireland Assembly (1973)
New assembly	Assembly Member for North Antrim; 1973–1974	Assembly abolished
Northern Ireland Constitutional Convention
New convention	Member for North Antrim; 1975–1976	Convention dissolved
European Parliament
New constituency	Member of the European Parliament for Northern Ireland; 1979–2004	Succeeded by Jim Allister
Northern Ireland Assembly (1982)
New assembly	MPA for North Antrim; 1982–1986	Assembly abolished
Northern Ireland Forum
New forum	Member for North Antrim; 1996–1998	Forum dissolved
Northern Ireland Assembly
New assembly	Member of the Legislative Assembly for Antrim North; 1998–2011	Succeeded by David McIlveen
Political offices
Vacant Title last held by David Trimble (1998–2002)	First Minister of Northern Ireland; 2007–2008	Succeeded by Peter Robinson
Honorary titles
Preceded by Piara Khabra	Oldest sitting Member of Parliament; 2007–2010	Succeeded by Sir Peter Tapsell
Religious titles
Preceded by Sydney Lince	Moderator of the Free Presbyterian Church of Ulster; 1951–2008	Succeeded by Ron Johnstone
