= Senator McCulloch (disambiguation) =

Roscoe C. McCulloch (1880–1958) was a U.S. Senator from Ohio from 1929 to 1930. Senator McCulloch may also refer to:

- George McCulloch (1792–1861), Pennsylvania State Senate
- Henry Eustace McCulloch (1816–1895), Texas State Senate

== See also ==
- Senator McCullough (disambiguation)
