= Ulster Protestant Action =

Ulster loyalist group (1956–1966)

Ulster Protestant Action (UPA) was an Ulster loyalist political party and Protestant fundamentalist vigilante group in Northern Ireland that was founded in 1956 and re-formed as the Protestant Unionist Party in 1966.

== Founding ==
The group was established at a special meeting at the Ulster Unionist Party's (UUP) offices in Glengall Street, Belfast, in 1956. Among the attendees were many loyalists who were to become major figures in the 1960s and 1970, such as Ian Paisley and Desmond Boal. The independent unionist MP Norman Porter also attended but took no further part in the group. The meeting's declared purpose was to organise the defence of Ulster Protestant areas against anticipated Irish Republican Army (IRA) activity, based on the old Ulster Protestant Association immediately after the partition of Ireland in 1920. The new body decided to call itself "Ulster Protestant Action", and the first year of its existence was taken up with the discussion of vigilante patrols, street barricades and drawing up lists of IRA suspects in Belfast and rural areas.

The initial executive of the UPA consisted of John McQuade, Billy Spence, Charles McCullough, Richard Fenton, Frank Millar, Sammy Verner, Herbert Ditty, Bob Newman and Noel Doherty, with Paisley as an ex officio member.

== Change in focus ==
Even though no IRA threat materialised in Belfast, and despite it becoming clear that the IRA's activities during the Border Campaign were to be limited to the border areas, Ulster Protestant Action remained in being. Factory and workplace branches were formed under the UPA, including one by Paisley in Belfast's Ravenhill area under his direct control. The concern of the UPA increasingly came to focus on the defence of "Bible Protestantism" and Protestant interests where jobs and housing were concerned.

== Venture into politics ==
Although initially opposed to professional politicians, specifically banning them from membership of the group, the UPA stood the former Belfast City Councillor and superintendent of an independent gospel mission, Albert Duff, against Brian Maginess in Iveagh at the 1958 Northern Ireland general election. Maginess was perceived as being sympathetic to Catholics, having banned an Orange Order parade in 1952, and Duff was able to take 41.5% of the vote, although he failed to win the seat. Duff was more successful in May 1958, when he regained a seat on Belfast City Council, with Charles McCullough also taking a seat for the UPA. Further, in 1960, Boal won the Belfast Shankill constituency at Stormont as an official UUP candidate.

== Split with Paisley ==
As Paisley came to dominate Ulster Protestant Action, he received his first convictions for public order offences. In June 1959, a major riot occurred on the Shankill Road in Belfast following a rally he had spoken at. His moves to form a Protestant unionist political party caused tensions in the group, and Paisley's supporters formed their own "Premier" branch of the UPA, reinforcing their control of the group.

== Campaign against Terence O'Neill ==
In the 1960s, Paisley and the UPA campaigned against Prime Minister of Northern Ireland Terence O'Neill's rapprochement with the Republic of Ireland and his meetings with its Taoiseach Seán Lemass, an IRA veteran of the Easter Rising and Irish Civil War. They opposed efforts by O'Neill to deliver civil rights to the Catholic minority in Northern Ireland, especially the proposed abolition of gerrymandering of local electoral areas for the election of urban and county councils. In 1964, Paisley's demand that the Royal Ulster Constabulary remove an Irish Tricolour from Sinn Féin's Belfast offices led to two days of rioting after this was followed through. In the aftermath of these protests, Duff and James McCarroll were elected to Belfast City Council for the UPA. In 1966, the group re-formed as the Protestant Unionist Party.
