= Protestant Telegraph =

Northern Irish newspaper

- Founder(s): Noel Doherty; Ian Paisley
- Ceased publication: 1982
- Country: Northern Ireland

The Protestant Telegraph was a Northern Irish newspaper founded by Noel Doherty and Ian Paisley on 13 February 1966. It was noted for its Protestant fundamentalism and its attacks on the Roman Catholic Church, the Church of Ireland and the moderates within the Ulster Unionist Party, as typified by Terence O'Neill.

It was criticised by Prime Minister James Chichester-Clark:

In the Protestant Telegraph in terms of abuse and in terms of ridicule, in terms of language which I can only describe as disgusting, perhaps at times the hon. Gentleman has given equal treatment. He has given equal treatment of a kind which has been accorded not only to the religion of the minority but, as I have said, to most of those who have been working and striving for peace over the years in Northern Ireland, no matter what religion they belong to.

— James Chichester-Clark, HOME AFFAIRS, Hansard, 3 July 1970

The paper was printed by the Puritan Printing Company, which was based at the Ravenhill Road, Belfast, headquarters of the Free Presbyterian Church of Ulster. The paper continued as a vehicle for Paisley and the Democratic Unionist Party (which was formed in 1971) until 1982 when Peter Robinson, who felt that the party would benefit from a less religiously denominational paper, persuaded Ian Paisley to wind up the Protestant Telegraph and replace it with The Voice of Ulster.
