= Charles McCullough (Northern Ireland politician) =

Northern Irish politician

Member of the Northern Ireland Senate
- In office 1970–1972

Member of Belfast City Council
- In office 1958–1965

Personal details
- Born: 18 December 1923 Belfast, Northern Ireland
- Died: 4 October 2014 (aged 90)
- Party: Democratic Unionist (from 1971); Ulster Unionist Party (1961 - 1970)
- Other political affiliations: Ulster Protestant Action (1956 - 1961)

Charles McCullough, sometimes known as Charlie McCullough, (18 December 1923 – 4 October 2014) was a Northern Irish unionist politician, native of Belfast.

== Background ==
McCullough was based on the Shankill Road. He was a member of the founding executive of Ulster Protestant Action, in 1956. He was elected to Belfast City Council for the group in 1958, topping the poll. He left the group before the next elections, in 1961, joining the Ulster Unionist Party (UUP).

Cullough secured re-election under his new party colours and, by 1965, he was the chair of its Improvement Committee. He resigned from this following a dispute over the naming of the Queen Elizabeth Bridge; he had instead hoped it would be named for Edward Carson, and believed that this name had been rejected due to party indiscipline.

In 1968, McCullough was elected to the Senate of Northern Ireland. He resigned from the UUP in September 1970, and became a founder member of the Democratic Unionist Party (DUP) the following year. The Senate ceased to meet in 1972, and, although McCullough remained a supporter of the DUP, he did not stand in any further elections. On 4 October 2014, he died at the age of 90.
